= Dominikowice, Lesser Poland Voivodeship =

Dominikowice
- Village
- Location within Poland
- Coordinates: 49°39′N 21°12′E
- Country: Poland
- Voivodeship: Lesser Poland
- County: Gorlice
- Gmina: Gorlice
- Population: 2,000

Dominikowice [dɔminikɔˈvit͡sɛ] is a village in the administrative district of Gmina Gorlice, within Gorlice County, Lesser Poland Voivodeship, in southern Poland.

The village has an approximate population of 2,000.

The village belongs to one of the oldest rural settlements in the area, having been endowed by the king on a Polish knight, Dominik Pieniążek (see: Jan Chryzostom Pieniążek, from Odrowąż family (see Odrowąż coat of arms) in 1291. The village has long comprised what is now the villages of Kobylanka, Klęczany and other negligible adjacent areas, until those two became separate nobility's (szlachta's) estates.

Unlike most of the neighbouring villages, which before the Operation Vistula (1940s) were largely inhabited by Rusyns' populations (recently called "Lemkos" to avoid inappropriate associating them with any Russian proveniences), throughout the history, Dominikowice and Kobylanka constituted almost homogenously Polish settlement.
