= Wilczak =

- Village
- Location within Poland
- Coordinates: 49°42′51″N 21°13′5″E
- Country: Poland
- Voivodeship: Lesser Poland
- County: Gorlice
- Gmina: Biecz

Wilczak [ˈvilt͡ʂak] was a village in the administrative district of Gmina Biecz, within Gorlice County, Lesser Poland Voivodeship, in southern Poland. Now it is part of the village Strzeszyn.
