= Babinets =

Babinets may refer to:

- Babinets, Komarichsky District, Bryansk Oblast, village in Russia
- Sergey Babinets, Russian lawyer and human rights activist, member of the Crew Against Torture
- Savva (Babinets), Ukrainian archbishop of the Russian Orthodox Church
- Babinets (architecture), element of an Orthodox church building

== See also ==
- Babinec (disambiguation)
- Babiniec (disambiguation)
