= Kosiba =

Kosiba is a surname. Notable people with the surname include:

- Aleksander Kosiba (1901–1981), Polish geophysicist
- Piotr Kosiba (1855–1939), Polish Roman Catholic friar
