= Babinec (surname) =

Babinec is a Slavic surname. Notable people with the surname include:

- Greg Babinec, American politician
- Radim Babinec (born 1974), Czech lawyer and politician
- Štefan Babinec (born 1919) Czechoslovak and Slovak politician
- Susan Babinec, American scientist

== See also ==
- Babiniec (disambiguation)
