= Kąty, Gorlice County =

Kąty
- Village
- Location within Poland
- Coordinates: 49°46′35″N 21°10′23″E
- Country: Poland
- Voivodeship: Lesser Poland
- County: Gorlice
- Gmina: Biecz

Kąty [ˈkɔntɨ] is a village in the administrative district of Gmina Biecz, within Gorlice County, Lesser Poland Voivodeship, in southern Poland.
