= Kolonia Libusza =

- Village
- Location within Poland
- Coordinates: 49°42′14″N 21°13′27″E
- Country: Poland
- Voivodeship: Lesser Poland
- County: Gorlice
- Gmina: Biecz

Kolonia Libusza [kɔˈlɔɲa liˈbuʂa] is a village in the administrative district of Gmina Biecz, within Gorlice County, Lesser Poland Voivodeship, in southern Poland.
