= Stawiska =

Stawiska may refer to:

- Stawiska, Lower Silesian Voivodeship (south-west Poland)
- Stawiska, Radziejów County in Kuyavian-Pomeranian Voivodeship (north-central Poland)
- Stawiska, Rypin County in Kuyavian-Pomeranian Voivodeship (north-central Poland)
- Stawiska, Mogilno County in Kuyavian-Pomeranian Voivodeship (north-central Poland)
- Stawiska, Lesser Poland Voivodeship (south Poland)
- Stawiska, Masovian Voivodeship (east-central Poland)
- Stawiska, Silesian Voivodeship (south Poland)
- Stawiska, Pomeranian Voivodeship (north Poland)
- Stawiska, Warmian-Masurian Voivodeship (north Poland)
