= Staszkówka =

- Village
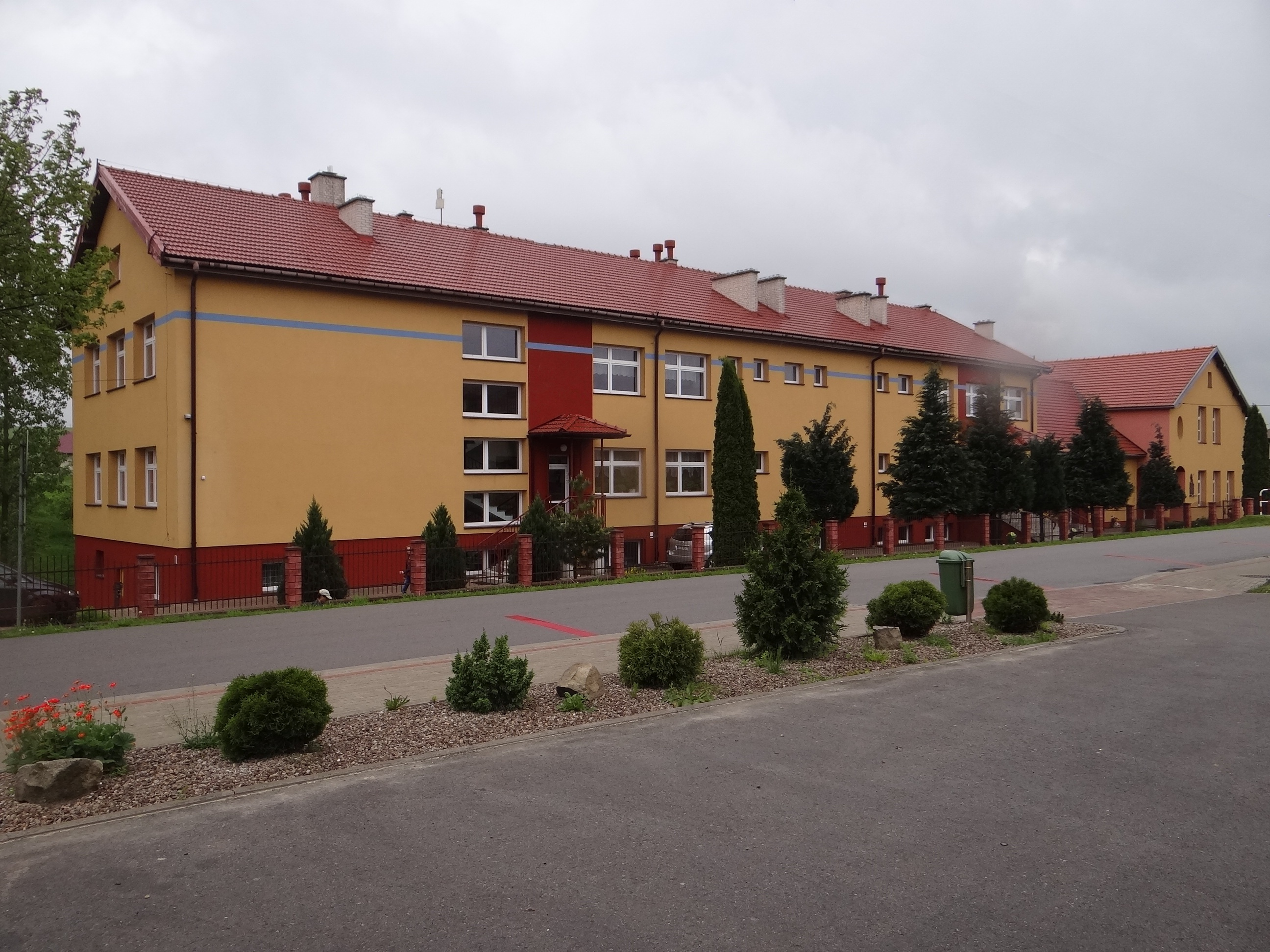
- School

- Location within Poland
- Coordinates: 49°46′N 21°2′E
- Country: Poland
- Voivodeship: Lesser Poland
- County: Gorlice
- Gmina: Moszczenica

Staszkówka [staʂˈkufka] is a village in the administrative district of Gmina Moszczenica, within Gorlice County, Lesser Poland Voivodeship, in southern Poland.
