= Racławice (disambiguation) =

Racławice is a village in Lesser Poland Voivodeship, site of the Battle of Racławice (1794).

Racławice may also refer to:

- Racławice, Gorlice County in Lesser Poland Voivodeship (south Poland)
- Racławice, Kraków County in Lesser Poland Voivodeship (south Poland)
- Racławice, Subcarpathian Voivodeship (south-east Poland)
- Racławice Śląskie in Opole Voivodeship (south Poland)
- Racławice, Greater Poland Voivodeship (west-central Poland)

== See also ==
- Battle of Racławice
- Racławice Panorama
