= Pogorzyna =

Pagorzyna
- Village
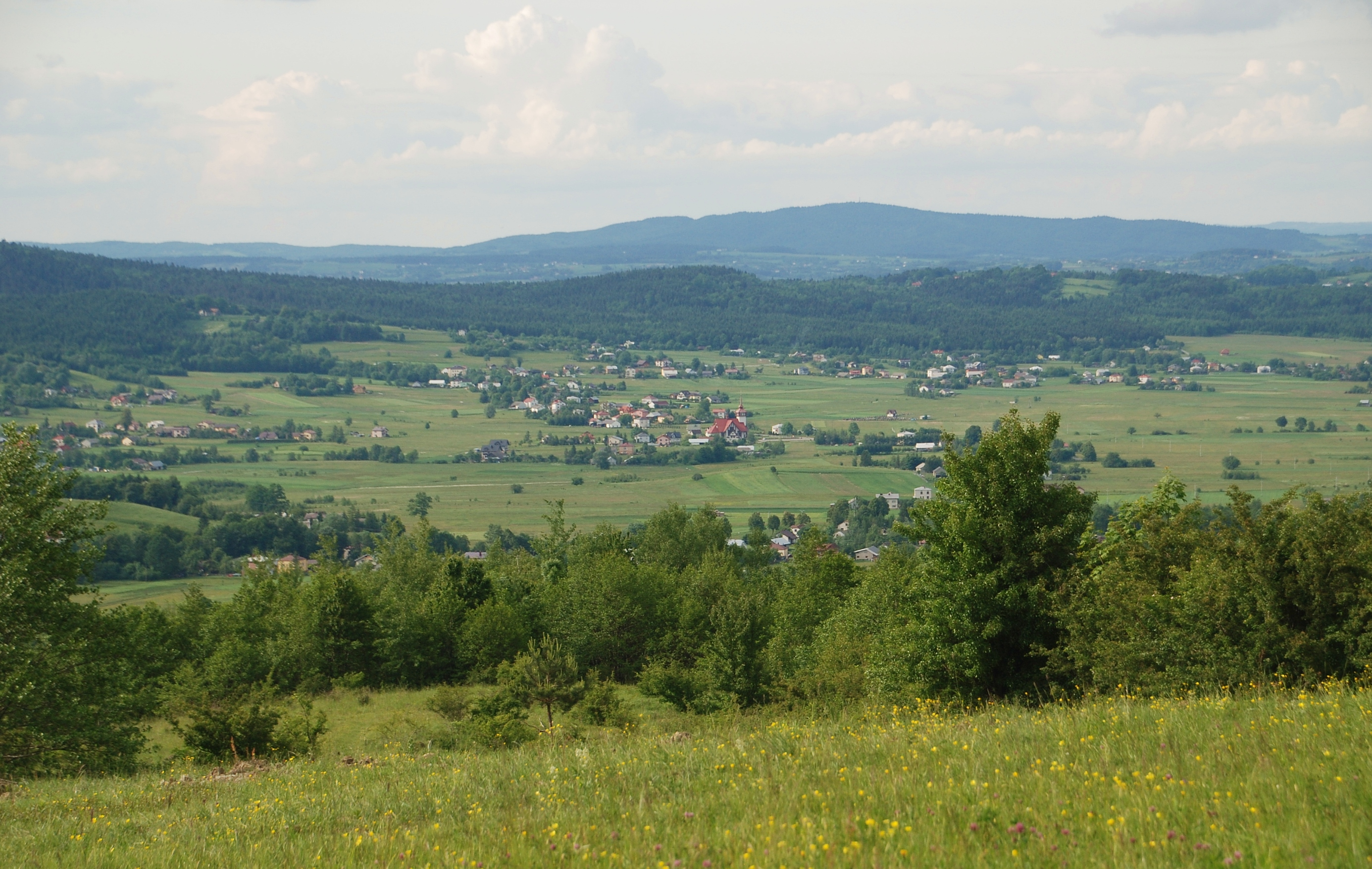
- Pagorzyna seen from the nearby hills

- Location within Poland
- Coordinates: 49°41′21″N 21°20′0″E
- Country: Poland
- Voivodeship: Lesser Poland
- County: Gorlice
- Gmina: Lipinki
- Elevation: 301 m (988 ft)

Population
  - Total: 740

Pagorzyna [pɔɡɔˈʐɨna], formerly Pogorzyna, is a village in the administrative district of Gmina Lipinki, within Gorlice County, Lesser Poland Voivodeship, in southern Poland.
