= Zielona Ulica =

- Village
- Location within Poland
- Coordinates: 49°46′10″N 21°12′16″E
- Country: Poland
- Voivodeship: Lesser Poland
- County: Gorlice
- Gmina: Biecz

Zielona Ulica (Polish pronunciation: [ʑɛˈlɔna uˈlit͡sa]) is a village in the administrative district of Gmina Biecz, within Gorlice County, Lesser Poland Voivodeship, in southern Poland.
