= Gmina Moszczenica =

Gmina Moszczenica may refer to either of the following rural administrative districts in Poland:

- Gmina Moszczenica, Lesser Poland Voivodeship
- Gmina Moszczenica, Łódź Voivodeship
