= Równie =

- Village
- Location within Poland
- Coordinates: 49°46′9″N 21°10′55″E
- Country: Poland
- Voivodeship: Lesser Poland
- County: Gorlice
- Gmina: Biecz

Równie [ˈruvɲɛ] is a village in the administrative district of Gmina Biecz, within Gorlice County, Lesser Poland Voivodeship, in southern Poland.
