= Serwoniec =

- Village
- Location within Poland
- Coordinates: 49°43′15″N 21°13′47″E
- Country: Poland
- Voivodeship: Lesser Poland
- County: Gorlice
- Gmina: Biecz

Serwoniec [sɛrˈvɔɲɛt͡s] is a village in the administrative district of Gmina Biecz, within Gorlice County, Lesser Poland Voivodeship, in southern Poland.
