= Babiniec, Lesser Poland Voivodeship =

Babiniec
- Settlement
- Location within Poland
- Coordinates: 49°46′15″N 21°8′30″E
- Country: Poland
- Voivodeship: Lesser Poland
- County: Gorlice
- Gmina: Biecz

Babiniec [baˈbiɲɛt͡s] is a settlement in the administrative district of Gmina Biecz, within Gorlice County, Lesser Poland Voivodeship, in southern Poland. It is now part of Rożnowice, Lesser Poland Voivodeship.
