= Bugaj, Gorlice County =

Bugaj
- Village
- Location within Poland
- Coordinates: 49°44′11″N 21°9′24″E
- Country: Poland
- Voivodeship: Lesser Poland
- County: Gorlice
- Gmina: Biecz
- Population: 473

Bugaj [ˈbuɡai̯] is a village in the administrative district of Gmina Biecz, within Gorlice County, Lesser Poland Voivodeship, in southern Poland.
