= Fortepian =

- Village
- Location within Poland
- Coordinates: 49°46′26″N 21°9′50″E
- Country: Poland
- Voivodeship: Lesser Poland
- County: Gorlice
- Gmina: Biecz

Fortepian [fɔrˈtɛpjan] is a village in the administrative district of Gmina Biecz, within Gorlice County, Lesser Poland Voivodeship, in southern Poland.

The village's name is the Polish word for piano.
