= Pola, Lesser Poland Voivodeship =

Pola
- Settlement
- Location within Poland
- Coordinates: 49°46′26″N 21°9′28″E
- Country: Poland
- Voivodeship: Lesser Poland
- County: Gorlice
- Gmina: Biecz

Pola [ˈpɔla] is a settlement in the administrative district of Gmina Biecz, within Gorlice County, Lesser Poland Voivodeship, in southern Poland.
