= Fiszty =

- Settlement
- Location within Poland
- Coordinates: 49°45′5″N 21°7′53″E
- Country: Poland
- Voivodeship: Lesser Poland
- County: Gorlice
- Gmina: Biecz

Fiszty [ˈfiʂtɨ] is a settlement in the administrative district of Gmina Biecz, within Gorlice County, Lesser Poland Voivodeship, in southern Poland.
