= HOBAG =

Nazi German company using forced labor

Nazi German forced labor camp
- Location: Breslau, Germany
- Date: April 1940 – January 1943
- Perpetrators: Nazi Germany

Holzbau AktienGesellschaft Breslau (HOBAG) was a German firm located in Breslau, Nazi Germany, notorious for using forced labour. In April 1941, 200 Jewish men from the Gorlice ghetto were conscripted as forced labor. In January 1943, 70 were still alive and they were transferred to another labor camp in Muszyna.

== Background ==
HOBAG was a sawmill facility located in Breslau, Nazi Germany (now Wrocław in Poland), which manufactured various wooden products used in the German war effort. The majority of its output was prefabricated wooden barracks or coffins for German military casualties. A few wooden bats were also created for the Jewish Ghetto Police to keep order.

The use of forced labor under German rule during World War II was very common. By the fall of 1940, the Jewish population in the town of Gorlice in southeastern Poland had increased to around 4,000 people, due in part to Kristallnacht, which drove many Jews out of Germany and into Poland. Jews who owned small businesses were allowed to manage them, but only women were allowed to work in them. There was a fear among able-bodied Jewish men of being kidnapped and taken to a forced labor camp, a frequent occurrence, prompting the Germans to create the Judenrat, or Jewish Council. The seven Jewish leaders who made up the Judenrat were headed by a local lawyer, Dr. Henryk Arnold, with Dr. Jakub Blech as his deputy. The Gorlice Judenrat was in place until the regional Judenrat in Jasło took control. They were instructed to find labor volunteers to end the random kidnappings, and 200 Jewish men were enlisted to work at the German company, HOBAG, in April 1941.

Men were killed while working in the sawmill if their work slowed, a tactic used to instill fear in the Jewish workers. Non-Jewish Poles also working at HOBAG provided the Jewish workers with food in addition to their rations so they would be able to keep up with the demanding work. Until December 1, 1942, the Jews working at HOBAG received extremely low wages, which was rare for Jewish forced laborers during the war, who were normally unpaid. The workers continued to live in the Gorlice Ghetto along with the rest of the Jewish population, until evacuations began. During mid-August 1942, around 200 non-HOBAG laborers in the ghetto were collected and sent to the Kraków-Płaszów concentration camp, while many more were taken by truck to Stróżówka where they were lined up and shot in a pit in the Garbacz Forest by the Nazis. The HOBAG laborers were exempt from these evacuations of the Gorlice Ghetto, and the workers were instead taken to live in the grounds of the sawmill.

On January 6, 1943, the seventy of the original two hundred Jews working at HOBAG who were still alive were transported to another labor camp in Muszyna. Only a handful of the Jews who worked at HOBAG managed to survive the entirety of World War II.
