= Bystra, Gorlice County =

Bystra
- Village
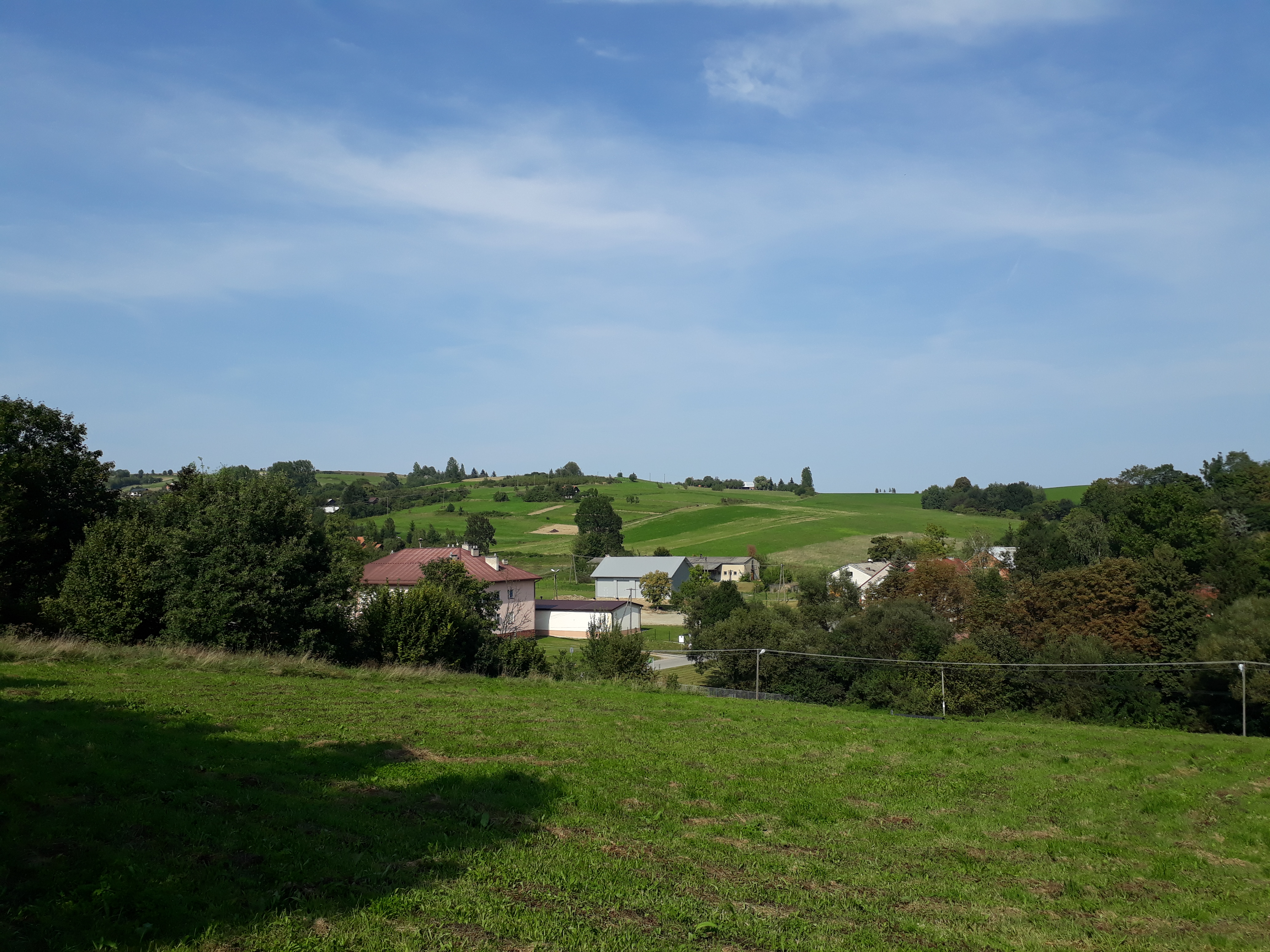

- Location within Poland
- Coordinates: 49°39′43″N 21°5′10″E
- Country: Poland
- Voivodeship: Lesser Poland
- County: Gorlice
- Gmina: Gorlice
- Population: 2,000

Bystra [ˈbɨstra] is a village in the administrative district of Gmina Gorlice, within Gorlice County, Lesser Poland Voivodeship, in southern Poland.
