= Wójtowa =

- Village
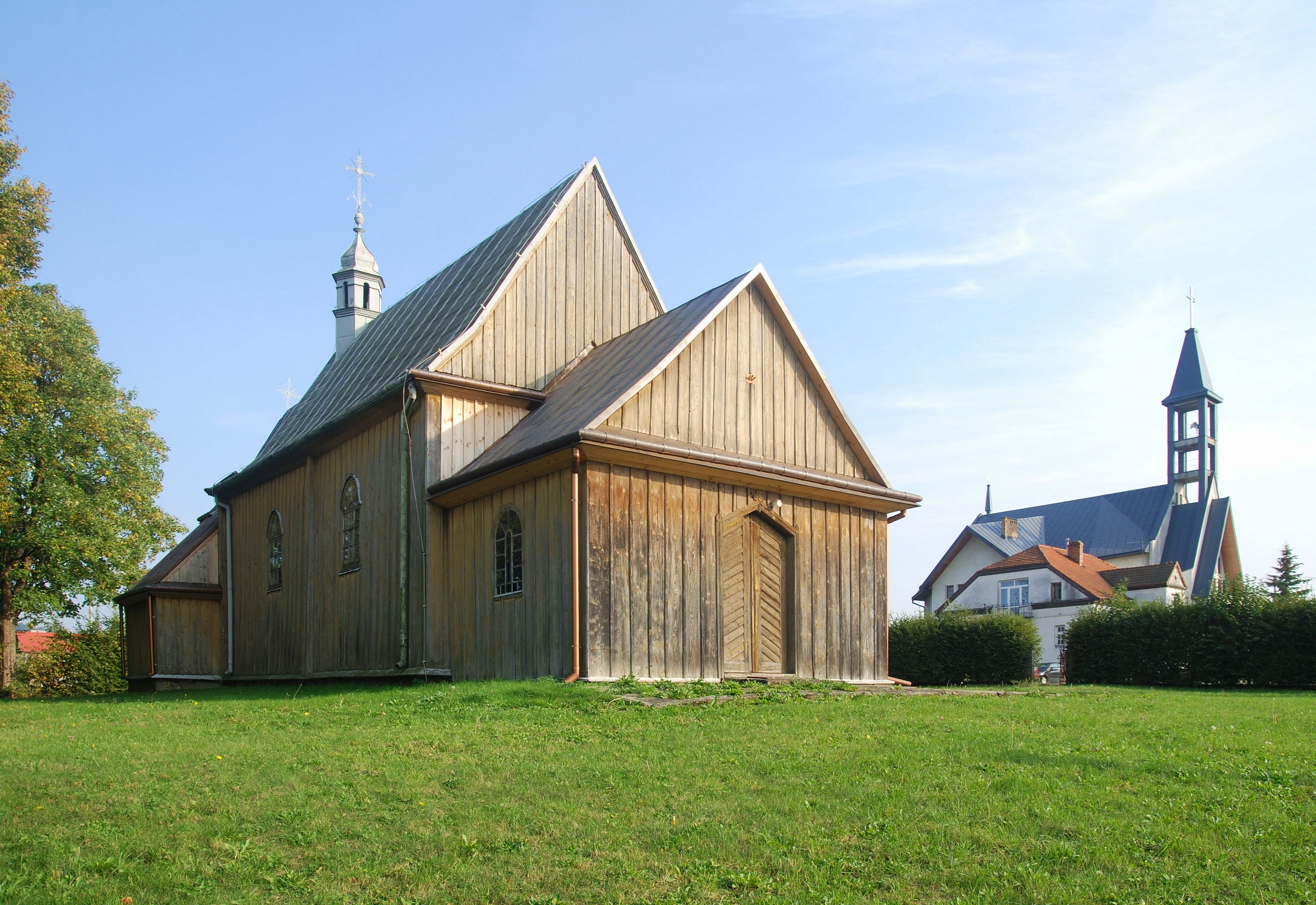
- Church of Saint Bartholomew

- Location within Poland
- Coordinates: 49°41′50″N 21°18′37″E
- Country: Poland
- Voivodeship: Lesser Poland
- County: Gorlice
- Gmina: Lipinki

Population
  - Total: 1,500

Wójtowa (Polish pronunciation: [vujˈtɔva]) is a village in the administrative district of Gmina Lipinki, within Gorlice County, Lesser Poland Voivodeship, in southern Poland.
