= Kryg, Lesser Poland Voivodeship =

Kryg
- Village
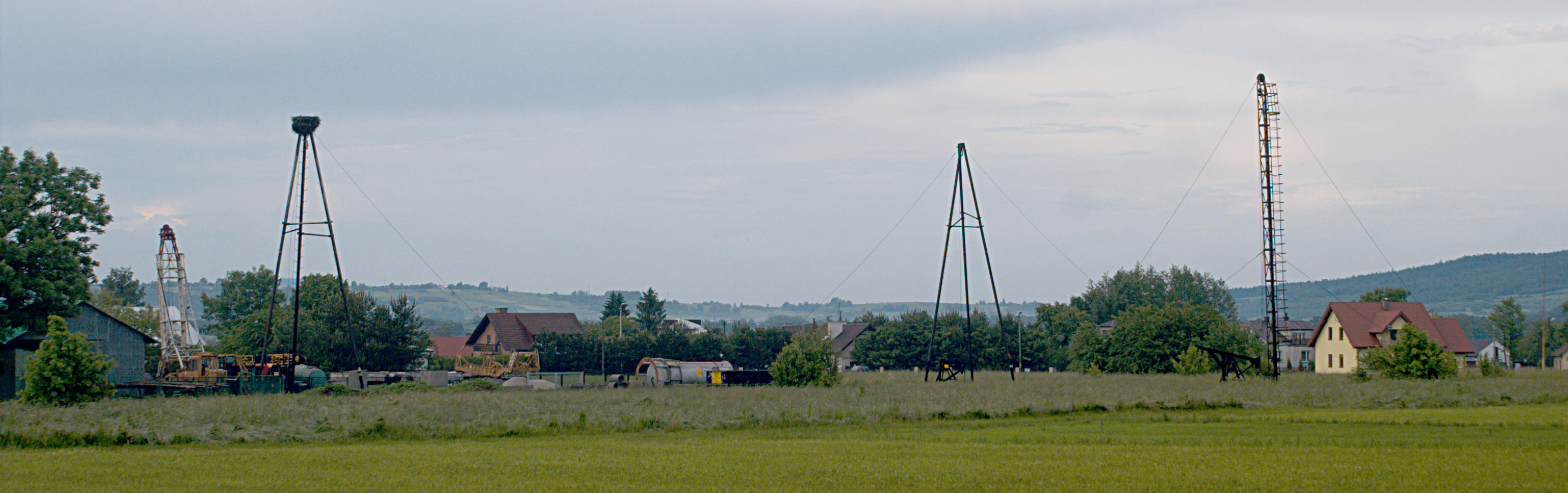

- Location within Poland
- Coordinates: 49°40′N 21°15′E
- Country: Poland
- Voivodeship: Lesser Poland
- County: Gorlice
- Gmina: Lipinki
- Population: 1,830

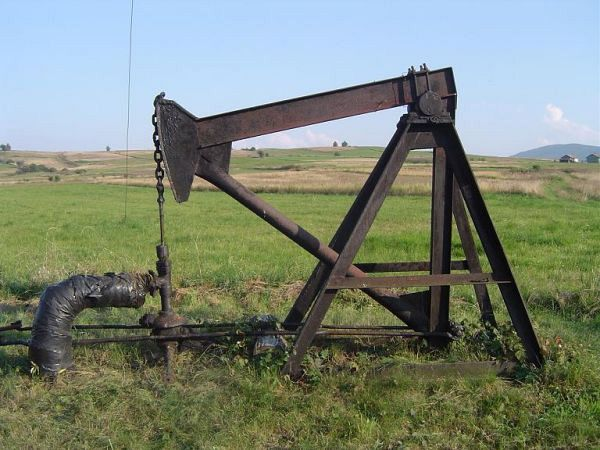
Pumpjack in Kryg

Kryg [krɨk] is a village in the administrative district of Gmina Lipinki, within Gorlice County, Lesser Poland Voivodeship, in southern Poland.

== Name of the village ==
"Kryg" may come from one of a few roots. In old German, "krieg" means "war", but in old Polish it means jack or device for tensioning crossbows.

== Geographical landmarks ==
The village is situated at the foot of Dubnakowa Mountain, and Łysula Mountain in the valley of the streams Krygowianka and Królówka.

== Architecture and monuments ==
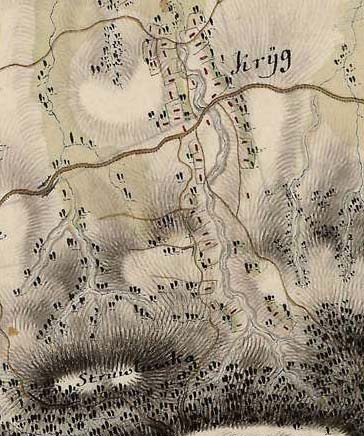
Kryg ina map of Josephinische Landesaufnahme (1763-1787)

In the center of the village is the church, which is a brick nave temple kept in the Baroque style, built between 1932 and 1934.

In the village there are several dozen oil wells, which now are largely liquidated.

== See also ==
- Walddeutsche
