= Piotr Kosiba =

Venerable Piotr Kosiba O.F.M.
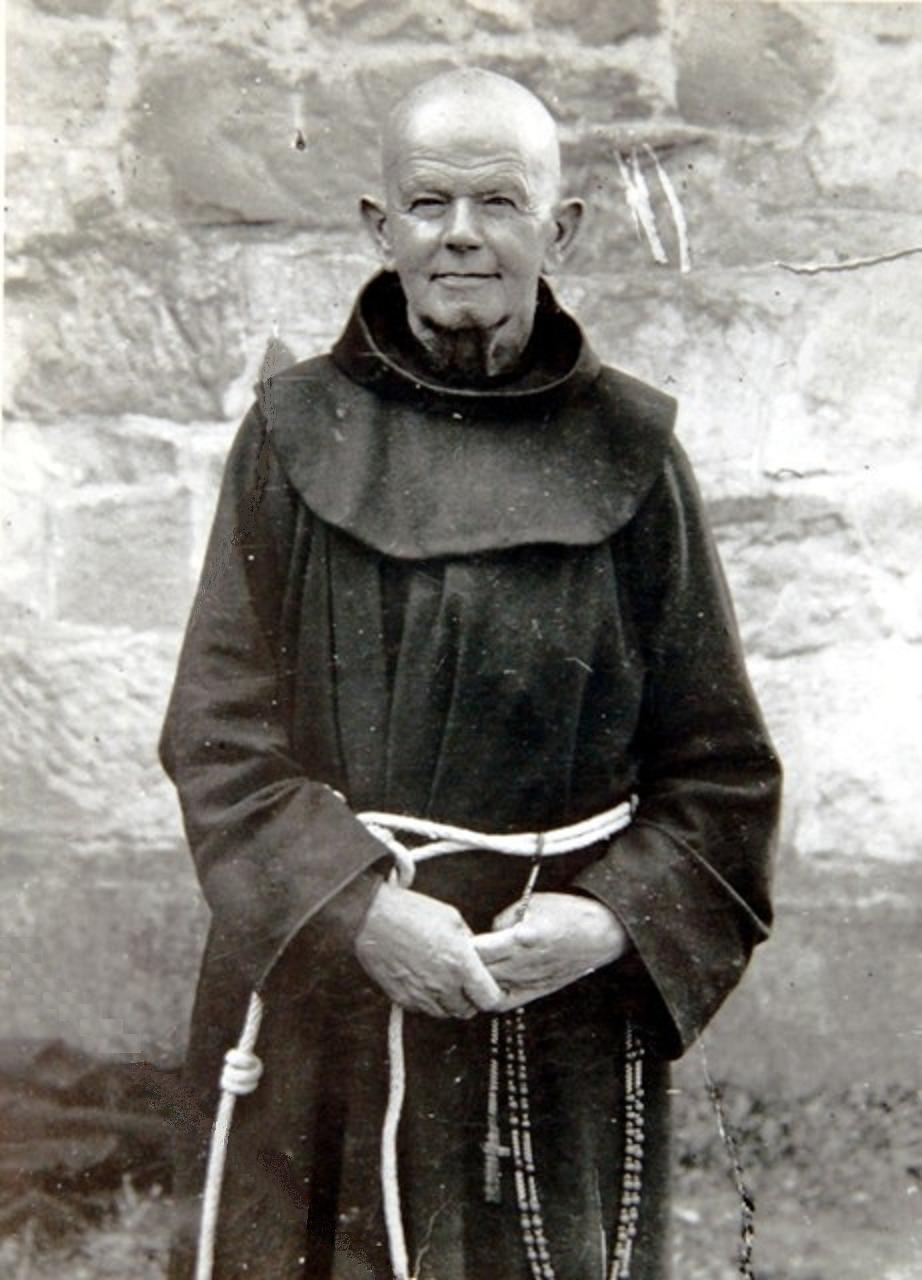
- Kosiba circa 1930
- Born: 29 June 1855; Libusza, Biecz, Gorlice County, Congress Poland
- Died: 4 January 1939 (aged 83); Wieliczka, Second Polish Republic
- Venerated in: Roman Catholic Church
- Attributes: Franciscan habit

Piotr Kosiba (29 June 1855 – 4 January 1939) – in religious Alojzy – was a Polish Roman Catholic professed religious and member from the Order of Friars Minor; he was often dubbed the "Holy Almoner" or the "Apostle of Goodness and the Poor. He was born to poor farmers and worked straight after his education as a shoemaker due to being unable to afford further education; he was likewise unable to pursue his dream of becoming a priest due to wanting to work to support his siblings. He joined the Franciscans as a religious brother instead in 1878 and worked as their cobbler and beekeeper while ministering to poor children and going around asking for alms for them. His apostolate continued in World War I when he would bring gifts to those affected.

Kosiba's process for beatification launched in the 1960s and he became titled as a Servant of God. He had a large number of devotees following his death which included the Bishop (and future pope) Karol Józef Wojtyła and the Archbishop of Kraków Franciszek Macharski. He became titled as Venerable in mid-2017 after Pope Francis acknowledged the fact that the late religious had lived a life of heroic virtue.

== Life ==
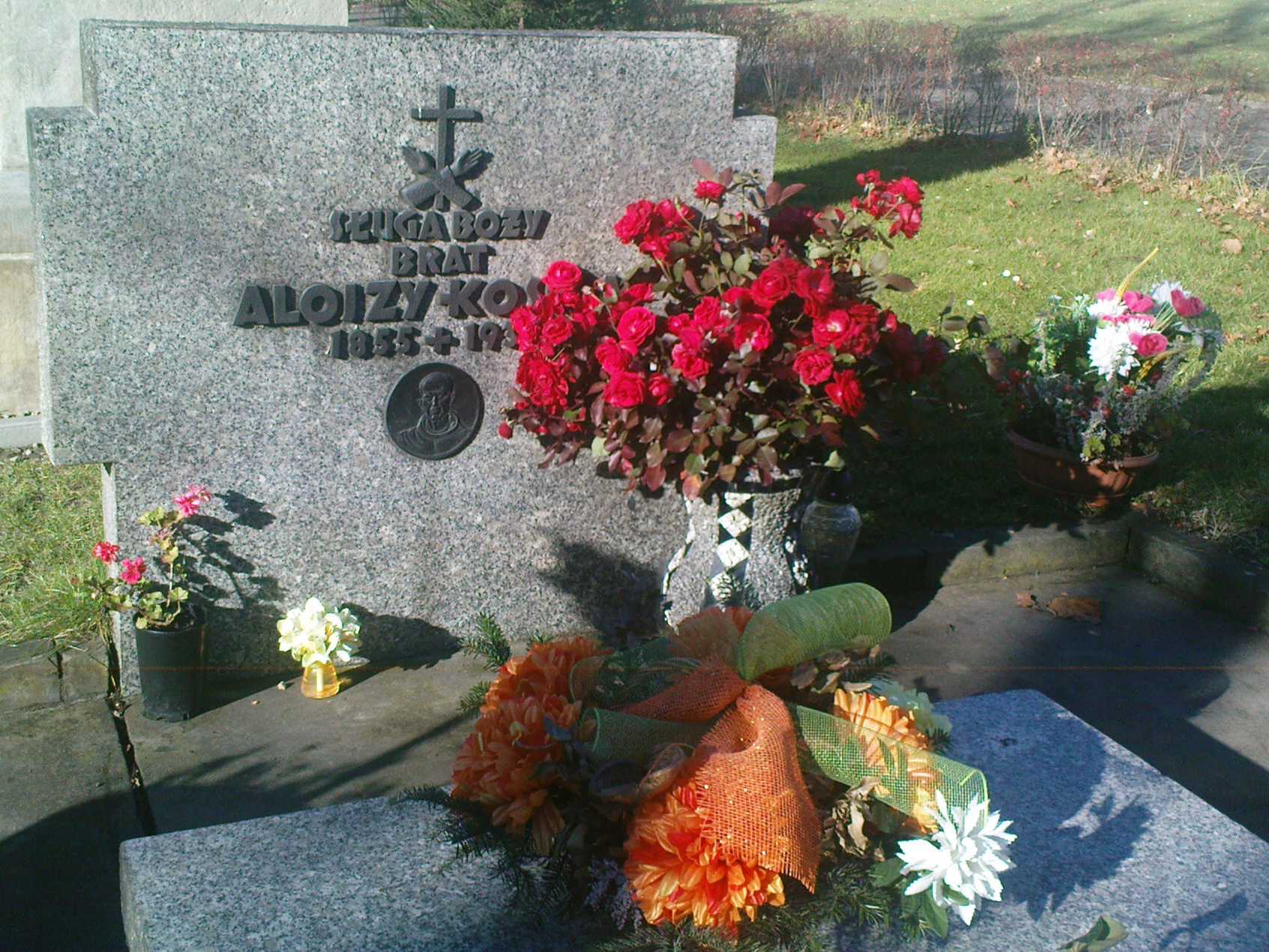
Kosiba's tomb.

Piotr Kosiba was born on 29 June 1855 in Libusza in his parents' log home as the second of three children to the poor farmers Jan Kosiba and Agnieszka (who were married on 29 January 1849). His paternal grandparents were Maciej Kosiba and Katarzyna Przybyłowicz and his maternal grandparents were Valentin and Anna (who died from cholera in 1845). He received his baptism just hours after his birth in the wooden church of the Blessed Virgin from its parish priest Alojzy Haas (his godparents were his neighbors Józef Sroka and Marianna Piotrowska). His siblings (in order) were his brother Jacob and his sister Ludwika (born on 18 December 1857). His mother died on 21 December 1857 when he was a toddler just before Christmas after giving birth to Ludwika. His father – who was managing seven acres of land – remarried to Apolonia Kosibow and had seven more children with three of them having died in their infancies.

His maternal aunt was Tekla. Her daughter (and Kosiba's cousin) Agata married Walenty in 1872 and the couple had twelve children. Maciej – one of those children – became a blacksmith and emigrated to the United States in 1905. Two of Maciej's siblings married relatives of Jan Kosiba's mother Katarzyna Przybyłowicz.

He did his schooling in his hometown from 1862 until 1866 and his father then asked him to continue his studies in order to prepare him for work. Kosiba decided to learn cobbling as his trade since his poor financial condition did not allow for him to pursue further education. He had felt called to the religious life since his childhood (during that time he served also as an altar server at his local parish church) and set himself on becoming a priest. But his poor financial state prompted him to seek a trade that would best support his siblings. He earned a certificate that certified him as a shoemaker in Biecz around 1874 and then worked at a shoe warehouse in Tarnów from 1876 until 1878 in order to support his siblings. It was in Biecz that he first met friars from the Order of Friars Minor and after visiting their Wieliczka convent decided to join their ranks as a professed religious rather than as an ordained priest. He liked talking to the friars after his first meeting with them and often participated in their Masses when he was not working. He entered the Franciscans in 1878 and arrived at their convent for admittance on 7 March; he had to wait for his time as a postulant to begin though was vested in the Franciscan habit on 21 June 1878 and received his religious name of "Alojzy". This latter name was a cause for Kosiba's satisfaction since he was noted in life for having a strong devotion to Aloysius Gonzaga and also to Peter the Apostle. He was first stationed in Jarosław but was soon transferred back to Wieliczka on 5 August 1878 (to prepare for beginning his Franciscan formation) where he was made the order's shoemaker and repairman for the monks' belts. Kosiba began his novitiate period on 22 September 1879 and made his initial profession on 22 September 1880 at 11:30am. He later made his solemn religious profession on 14 May 1855 into the hands of the Provincial priest Joachim Maciejczyk.

Kosiba did much for poor children whom he made the focus for his religious apostolate. Their concerns were his own and he made it a practice to provide for their spiritual and material needs. His colleague Brother Blazej Ranosz wrote in 1965 that Kosiba was "a monk without a reproach" and that "he loved the children" and "valued and loved the poor". He was also noted for his gentleness with all people and for his kind disposition that was demonstrated with the children more so. His collection and distribution of funds to the poor made him a popular figure but made him sometimes a figure of ridicule among some of his colleagues. He sometimes used a horse-drawn cart to go around for alms or would walk on foot. He also helped children facing hunger in the southern and eastern parts of Kraków during World War I when he would tend to those that the conflict affected while providing them with food. He also would provide them with medicine with the help of a pharmacist from Wieliczka. He would bring them gifts such as crosses and rosaries or pictures during the Christmas season. There was one tale said that a frustrated grandmother once poured hot soup on him as she chased him off her land after he had asked her for a small donation for the poor. He lived in a small cell and slept on bare boards on the floor. He would write using a goose feather and he wore a patched old habit. He also served for a brief period as his order's beekeeper at some stage. Kosiba was known for his humble and modest disposition and so modest was he in temperament that he could never look at women in the face when speaking to or with them.

Just after Christmas in 1938 he set off for a trip to Niegowić eight miles off but had to return due to feeling unwell. Upon his return he said to his colleagues: "I will die" in the knowledge that he was unwell. He learnt the following morning from his doctor Roman Wojtaszek that he had contracted pneumonia. This was exacerbated after he became depressed learning about the death of a new priest on 30 December 1938. Kosiba met with the Provincial on 2 January 1939 and the latter joked that Kosiba had to prepare and help him serve the Mass. But to his surprise the ill Kosiba got out of bed and began preparing for the service despite his grave condition. He felt faint and ill on 2 January and was confined to bed while on 3 January suffered from vomiting bouts and had a high fever. He began wearing a Carmelite scapular around his neck and asked that the image of the Blessed Mother be hanged near his bed so that he could look at it. Kosiba died with a small sigh at 8:00pm on 4 January 1939 after having confessed and receiving the Eucharist not long before. His remains were interred in an oak coffin in a grave he selected for himself in Wieliczka. His remains were exhumed twice in 1977 and 1998 before being relocated to a newer grave. Bishop Karol Józef Wojtyła (future pope) visited his grave and cell on 9 October 1961 and again later as a cardinal on 23 April 1970. The Archbishop of Kraków Franciszek Macharski also had a devotion to him and during his tenure as archbishop supported Kosiba's beatification cause.

== Beatification process ==
The beatification process launched in the Kraków archdiocese in an informative process that Bishop Karol Józef Wojtyła inaugurated on 13 May 1963 (therefore naming Kosiba as a Servant of God) and which he later closed on 10 May 1966. The cause remained dormant until 4 June 2004 when the Congregation for the Causes of Saints validated the informative process and then later receiving the official Positio dossier in 2007 for evaluation.

Nine theologians consulting the C.C.S. issued their approval for the cause on 14 June 2017 as did the C.C.S. cardinal and bishop members themselves later on 4 July 2017. Kosiba became titled as Venerable on 7 July 2017 after Pope Francis signed a decree that acknowledged the fact that the late religious had practiced heroic virtue throughout his life to a sufficient degree.

The current postulator for this cause is Giovangiuseppe Califano.

== In popular culture ==
The director Andrej Baranski oversaw production of a Polish film based on Kosiba's life in 2007 entitled Braciszek.
