= Piekło, Lesser Poland Voivodeship =

Piekło, Poland
- Village
- Location within Poland
- Coordinates: 49°45′48″N 21°10′4″E
- Country: Poland
- Voivodeship: Lesser Poland
- County: Gorlice
- Gmina: Biecz

Piekło [ˈpjɛkwɔ] is a village in the administrative district of Gmina Biecz, within Gorlice County, Lesser Poland Voivodeship, in southern Poland.
