= Półrole =

- Village
- Location within Poland
- Coordinates: 49°42′3″N 21°14′20″E
- Country: Poland
- Voivodeship: Lesser Poland
- County: Gorlice
- Gmina: Biecz

Półrole [puu̯ˈrɔlɛ] is a village in the administrative district of Gmina Biecz, within Gorlice County, Lesser Poland Voivodeship, in southern Poland.
