= Babinec =

Babinec may refer to:

- Babinec, Slovakia
- Babinec, Croatia
- Babinec (surname)

== See also ==
- Babiniec (disambiguation)
