= Kwiatonowice =

- Village
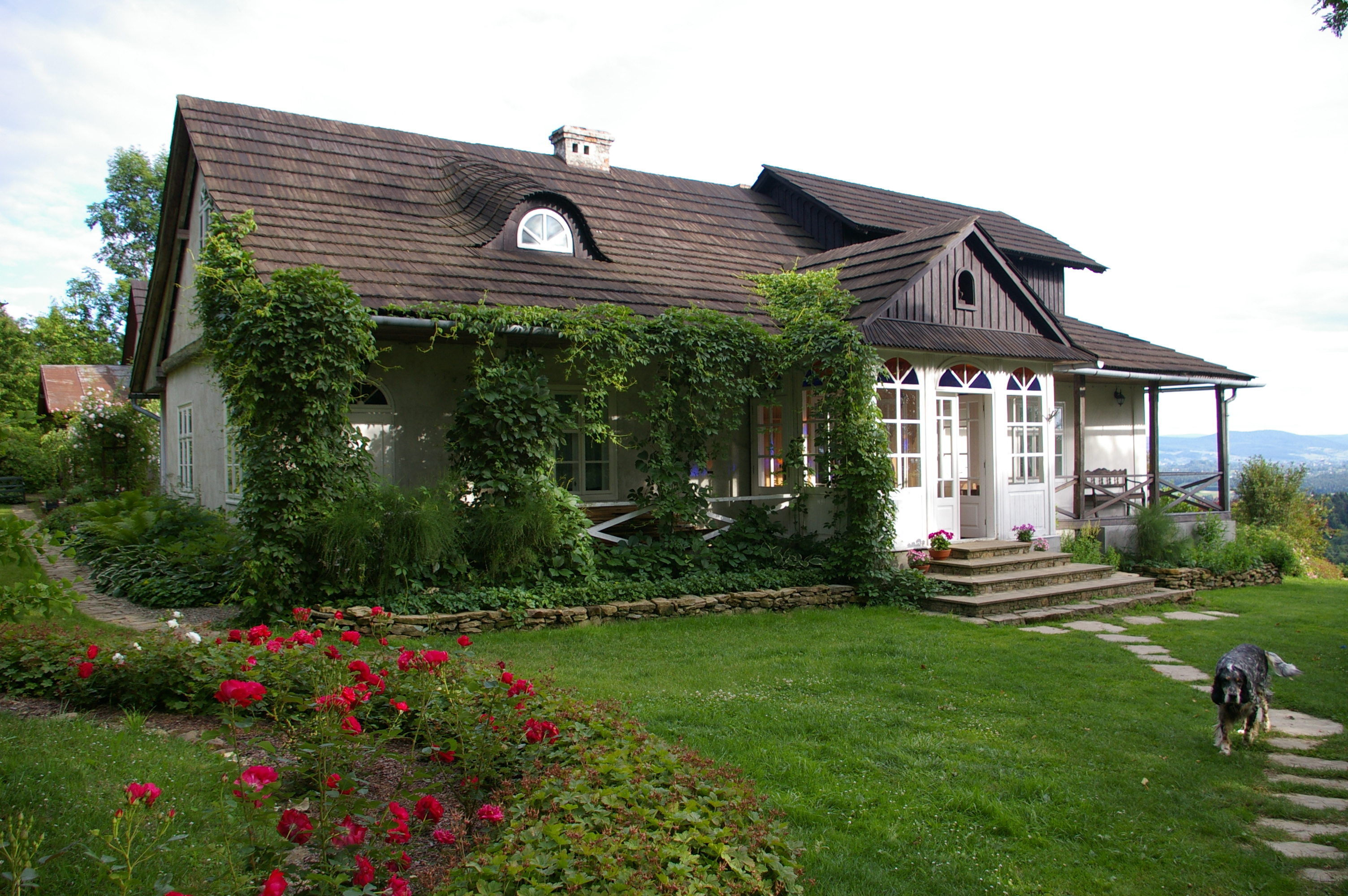
- Manor in Kwiatonowice

- Location within Poland
- Coordinates: 49°43′N 21°9′E
- Country: Poland
- Voivodeship: Lesser Poland
- County: Gorlice
- Gmina: Gorlice
- Elevation: 422 m (1,385 ft)

Population
  - Total: 610
- Website: www.kwiatonowice.pl

Kwiatonowice [kfjatɔnɔˈvit͡sɛ] is a village in the administrative district of Gmina Gorlice, within Gorlice County, Lesser Poland Voivodeship, in southern Poland.
