= Dolna Niwa =

- Village
- Location within Poland
- Coordinates: 49°41′34″N 21°13′32″E
- Country: Poland
- Voivodeship: Lesser Poland
- County: Gorlice
- Gmina: Biecz

Dolna Niwa [ˈdɔlna ˈniva] is a village in the administrative district of Gmina Biecz, within Gorlice County, Lesser Poland Voivodeship, in southern Poland.
