= Zagórze, Gorlice County =

Zagórze
- Village
- Location within Poland
- Coordinates: 49°42′44″N 21°11′50″E
- Country: Poland
- Voivodeship: Lesser Poland
- County: Gorlice
- Gmina: Biecz

Zagórze [zaˈɡuʐɛ] is a village in the administrative district of Gmina Biecz, within Gorlice County, Lesser Poland Voivodeship, in southern Poland.
