= Podskale, Lesser Poland Voivodeship =

Podskale
- Village
- Location within Poland
- Coordinates: 49°44′19″N 21°18′35″E
- Country: Poland
- Voivodeship: Lesser Poland
- County: Gorlice
- Gmina: Biecz

Podskale [pɔtsˈkalɛ] is a village in the administrative district of Gmina Biecz, within Gorlice County, Lesser Poland Voivodeship, in southern Poland.
