= Bednarka, Lesser Poland Voivodeship =

Bednarka
- Village
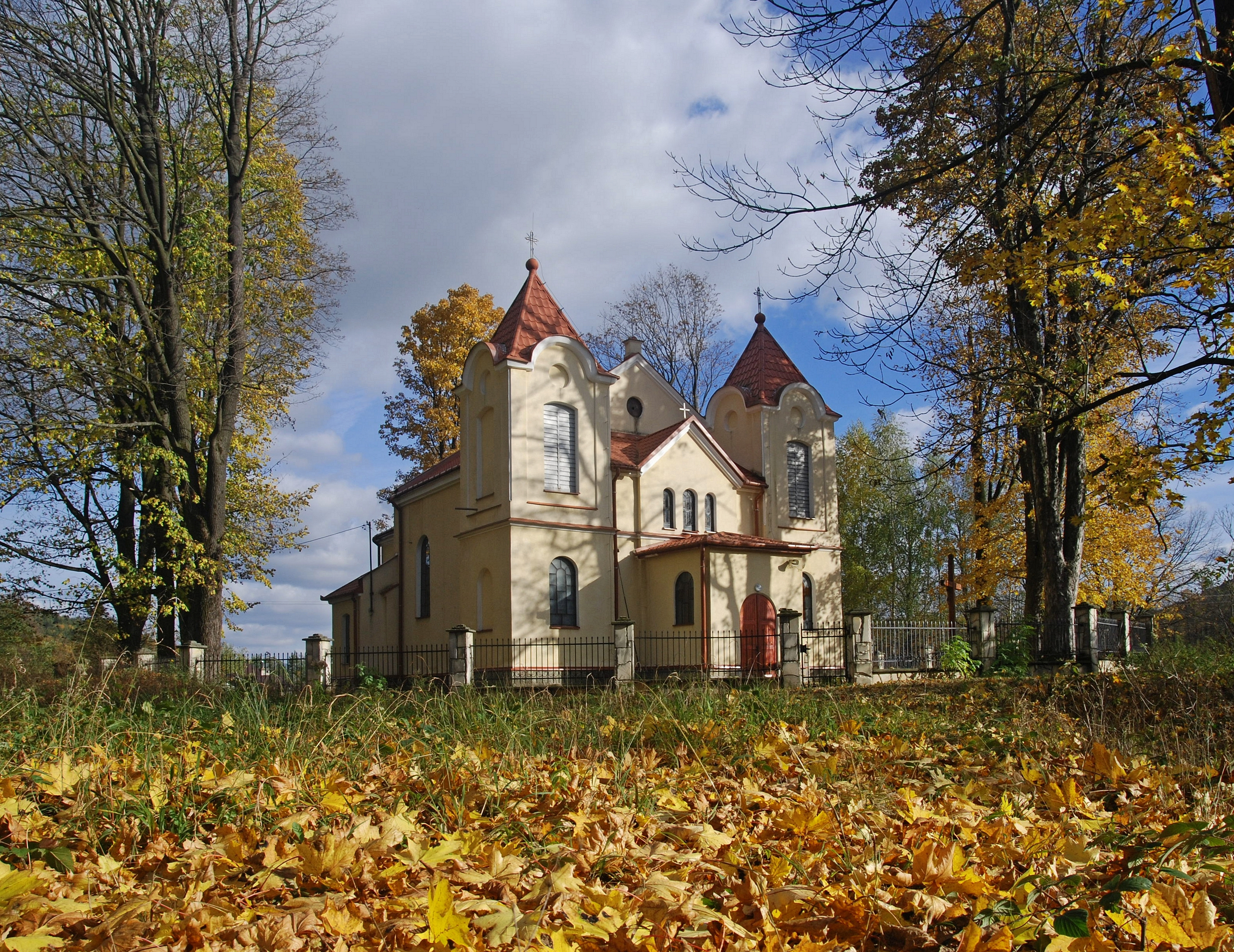
- Roman Catholic (formerly Greek Catholic) church

- Location within Poland
- Coordinates: 49°39′N 21°20′E
- Country: Poland
- Voivodeship: Lesser Poland
- County: Gorlice
- Gmina: Lipinki

Population
  - Total: 172

Bednarka [bɛdˈnarka] is a village in the administrative district of Gmina Lipinki, within Gorlice County, Lesser Poland Voivodeship, in southern Poland.
