= Łukowice, Lesser Poland Voivodeship =

Łukowice
- Village
- Location within Poland
- Coordinates: 49°46′9″N 21°9′40″E
- Country: Poland
- Voivodeship: Lesser Poland
- County: Gorlice
- Gmina: Biecz

Łukowice [wukɔˈvit͡sɛ] is a village in the administrative district of Gmina Biecz, within Gorlice County, Lesser Poland Voivodeship, in southern Poland.
