= Równia =

Równia may refer to:

- Równia, Lesser Poland Voivodeship, a village
- Równia, Podkarpackie Voivodeship, a village
- Równia pod Śnieżką, a subalpine plateau
