= Nagórze =

Nagórze may refer to the following places in Poland:

- Nagórze, Lower Silesian Voivodeship (south-west Poland)
- Nagórze, West Pomeranian Voivodeship (north-west Poland)
- Nagórze, Lesser Poland Voivodeship (south Poland)
