= Bednarskie =

- Village
- Location within Poland
- Coordinates: 49°40′8″N 21°19′59″E
- Country: Poland
- Voivodeship: Lesser Poland
- County: Gorlice
- Gmina: Lipinki
- Population: 180

Bednarskie [bɛdˈnarskʲɛ] is a village in the administrative district of Gmina Lipinki, within Gorlice County, Lesser Poland Voivodeship, in southern Poland.
