= Rozdziele, Gorlice County =

Rozdziele
- Village
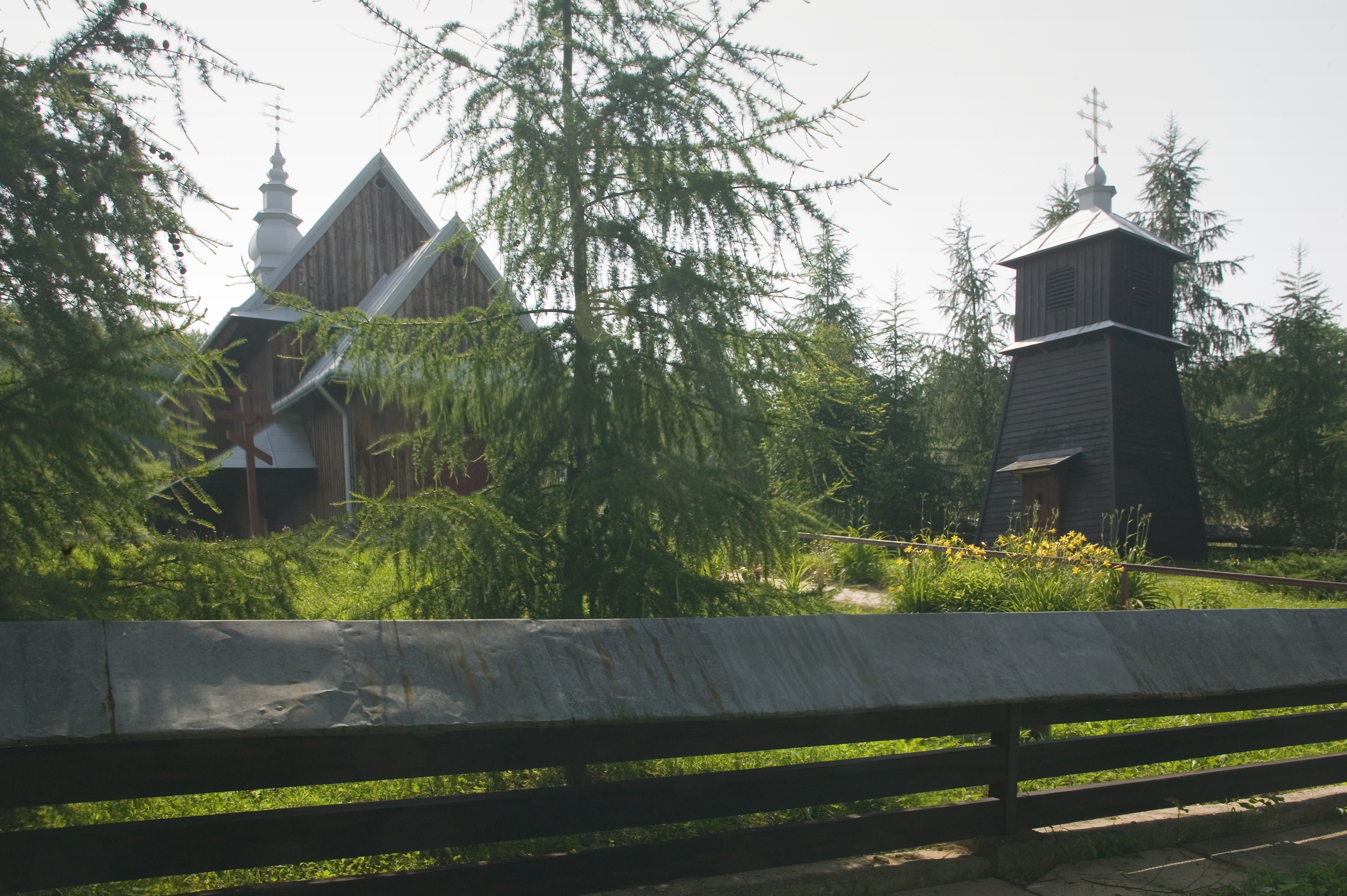
- Former Orthodox church moved to Rozdziele from Serednica

- Location within Poland
- Coordinates: 49°38′43″N 21°17′46″E
- Country: Poland
- Voivodeship: Lesser Poland
- County: Gorlice
- Gmina: Lipinki
- Population: 270

Rozdziele [rɔzˈd͡ʑɛlɛ] is a village in the administrative district of Gmina Lipinki, within Gorlice County, Lesser Poland Voivodeship, in southern Poland.
