= Kamieniec, Lesser Poland Voivodeship =

Kamieniec
- Village
- Location within Poland
- Coordinates: 49°44′43″N 21°12′14″E
- Country: Poland
- Voivodeship: Lesser Poland
- County: Gorlice
- Gmina: Biecz

Kamieniec [kaˈmjɛɲɛt͡s] is a village in the administrative district of Gmina Biecz, within Gorlice County, Lesser Poland Voivodeship, in southern Poland.
