= Dział, Gorlice County =

Dział
- Village
- Location within Poland
- Coordinates: 49°43′58″N 21°17′59″E
- Country: Poland
- Voivodeship: Lesser Poland
- County: Gorlice
- Gmina: Biecz

Dział [d͡ʑau̯] is a village in the administrative district of Gmina Biecz, within Gorlice County, Lesser Poland Voivodeship, in southern Poland.
