= Głęboka, Gorlice County =

Głęboka
- Village
- Location within Poland
- Coordinates: 49°44′N 21°19′E
- Country: Poland
- Voivodeship: Lesser Poland
- County: Gorlice
- Gmina: Biecz
- Population: 482

Głęboka [ɡwɛmˈbɔka] is a village in the administrative district of Gmina Biecz, within Gorlice County, Lesser Poland Voivodeship, in southern Poland.
