= Czyżówka =

Czyżówka may refer to:

- Czyżówka, Chrzanów County in Lesser Poland Voivodeship (south Poland)
- Czyżówka, Gorlice County in Lesser Poland Voivodeship (south Poland)
- Czyżówka, Masovian Voivodeship (east-central Poland)
- Czyżówka, Warmian-Masurian Voivodeship (north Poland)
