= Rzeki, Lesser Poland Voivodeship =

Rzeki
- Village
- Location within Poland
- Coordinates: 49°42′3″N 21°15′58″E
- Country: Poland
- Voivodeship: Lesser Poland
- County: Gorlice
- Gmina: Biecz

Rzeki [ˈʐɛki] is a village in the administrative district of Gmina Biecz, within Gorlice County, Lesser Poland Voivodeship, in southern Poland.
