= Sitnica (disambiguation) =

Sitnica may refer to:

- Sitnica (Ibar), a river in Kosovo
- Sitnica (Morača), a river in Montenegro

or:

- Sitnica, Bosnia and Herzegovina, a village in Bosnia and Herzegovina
- Sitnica, Lesser Poland Voivodeship, a village in Poland
- Sitnica, Lubusz Voivodeship, a village in Poland
