= Bukowina, Lesser Poland Voivodeship =

Bukowina
- Village
- Location within Poland
- Coordinates: 49°44′38″N 21°7′44″E
- Country: Poland
- Voivodeship: Lesser Poland
- County: Gorlice
- Gmina: Biecz

Bukowina [bukɔˈvina] is a village in the administrative district of Gmina Biecz, within Gorlice County, Lesser Poland Voivodeship, in southern Poland.
