= Pasternik =

Pasternik may refer to the following places in Poland:

- Pasternik, Lower Silesian Voivodeship (south-west Poland)
- Pasternik, Lesser Poland Voivodeship (south Poland)
- Pasternik, Masovian Voivodeship (east-central Poland)
