= Wyręby, Lesser Poland Voivodeship =

Wyręby
- Village
- Location within Poland
- Coordinates: 49°46′19″N 21°11′26″E
- Country: Poland
- Voivodeship: Lesser Poland
- County: Gorlice
- Gmina: Biecz

Wyręby [vɨˈrɛmbɨ] is a village in the administrative district of Gmina Biecz, within Gorlice County, Lesser Poland Voivodeship, in southern Poland.
