= Maśluchowice =

- Settlement
- Location within Poland
- Coordinates: 49°44′47″N 21°9′48″E
- Country: Poland
- Voivodeship: Lesser Poland
- County: Gorlice
- Gmina: Biecz

Maśluchowice [maɕluxɔˈvit͡sɛ] is a settlement in the administrative district of Gmina Biecz, within Gorlice County, Lesser Poland Voivodeship, in southern Poland.
