= Padoły =

- Settlement
- Location within Poland
- Coordinates: 49°45′10″N 21°8′28″E
- Country: Poland
- Voivodeship: Lesser Poland
- County: Gorlice
- Gmina: Biecz

Padoły [paˈdɔwɨ] is a settlement in the administrative district of Gmina Biecz, within Gorlice County, Lesser Poland Voivodeship, in southern Poland.
