= Strzeszyn, Lesser Poland Voivodeship =

Strzeszyn
- Village
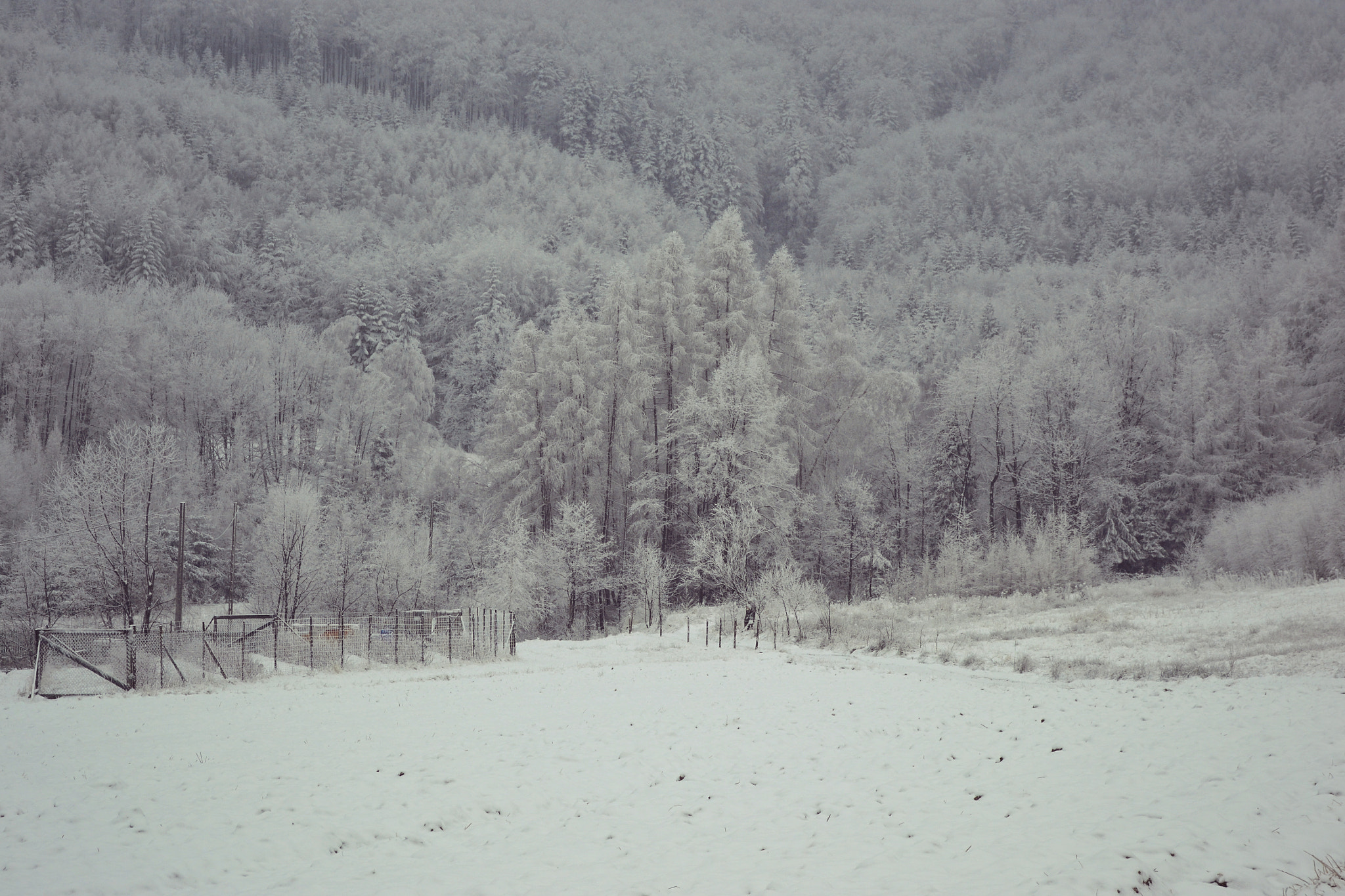

- Location within Poland
- Coordinates: 49°43′19″N 21°12′21″E
- Country: Poland
- Voivodeship: Lesser Poland
- County: Gorlice
- Gmina: Biecz
- Population: 2,020

Strzeszyn [ˈstʂɛʂɨn] is a village in the administrative district of Gmina Biecz, within Gorlice County, Lesser Poland Voivodeship, in southern Poland.
