= Czyżówka, Gorlice County =

Czyżówka
- Settlement
- Location within Poland
- Coordinates: 49°45′14″N 21°7′34″E
- Country: Poland
- Voivodeship: Lesser Poland
- County: Gorlice
- Gmina: Biecz

Czyżówka [t͡ʂɨˈʐufka] is a settlement in the administrative district of Gmina Biecz, within Gorlice County, Lesser Poland Voivodeship, in southern Poland.
