= Klęczany, Gorlice County =

Klęczany
- Village
- Location within Poland
- Coordinates: 49°43′N 21°13′E
- Country: Poland
- Voivodeship: Lesser Poland
- County: Gorlice
- Gmina: Gorlice

Klęczany [klɛnˈt͡ʂanɨ] is a village in the administrative district of Gmina Gorlice, within Gorlice County, Lesser Poland Voivodeship, in southern Poland.
