= Gmina Biecz =

Gmina Biecz Biecz Commune
- Gmina
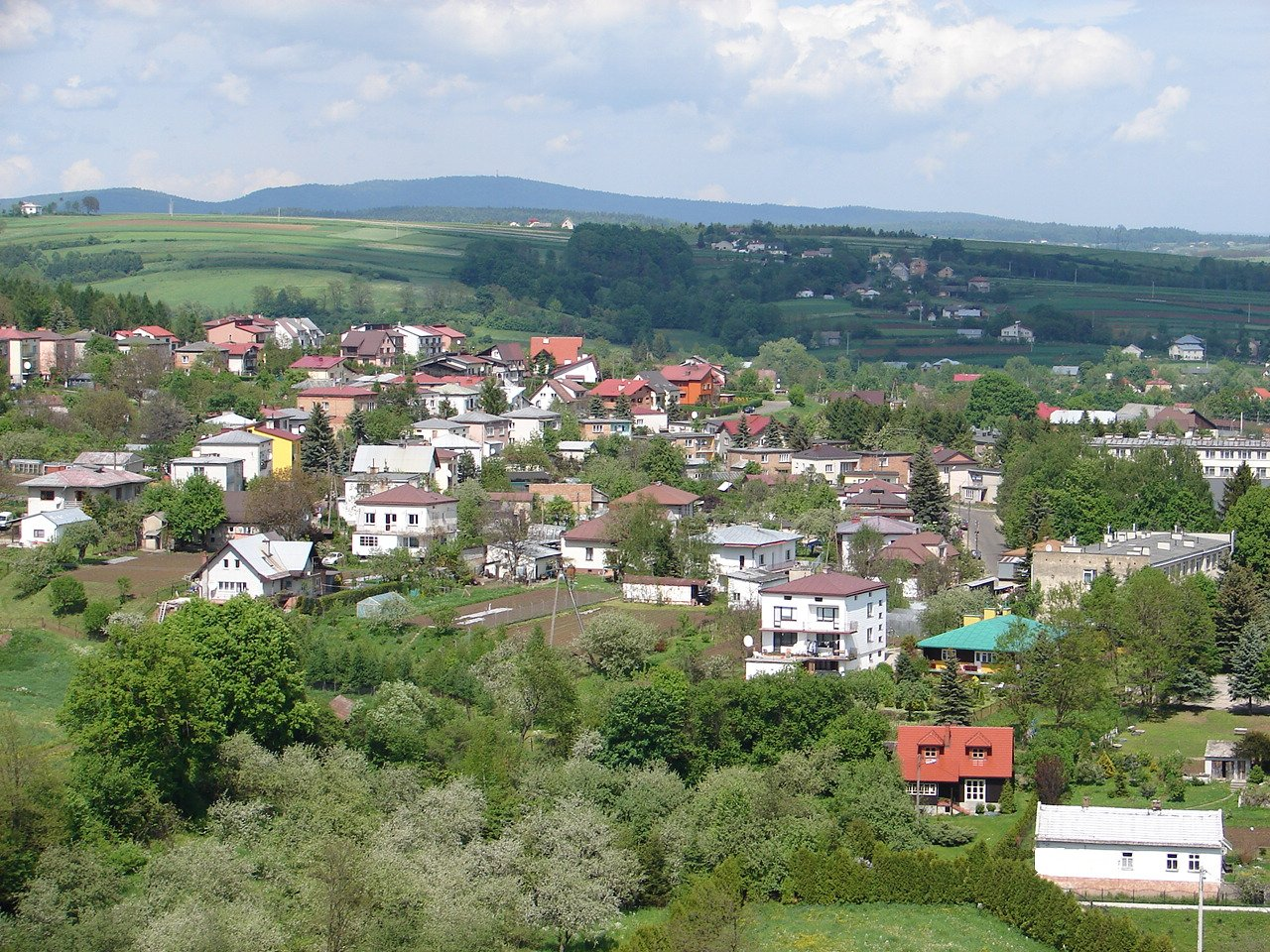

- Coat of arms

- Location within Lesser Poland Voivodeship Location within Poland
- Coordinates (Biecz): 49°43′55″N 21°15′45″E
- Country: Poland
- Voivodeship: Lesser Poland
- County: Gorlice
- Seat: Biecz

Area
  - Total: 98.28 km^{2} (37.95 sq mi)

Population (2006)
  - Total: 16,874
  - Density: 171.7/km^{2} (444.7/sq mi)
  - Urban: 4,585
  - Rural: 12,289
- Website: www.biecz.pl

Gmina Biecz is an urban-rural gmina (administrative district) in Gorlice County, Lesser Poland Voivodeship, in southern Poland. Its seat is the town of Biecz, which lies approximately 12 kilometres (7 mi) north-east of Gorlice and 102 km (63 mi) east of the regional capital Kraków.

The gmina covers an area of 99.28 square kilometres (38.3 sq mi), and as of 2006 its total population is 16,874 (out of which the population of Biecz amounts to 4,585, and the population of the rural part of the gmina is 12,289).

== Villages ==
Apart from the town of Biecz, Gmina Biecz contains the villages and settlements of Babiniec, Binarowa, Bugaj, Bukowina, Czyżówka, Dolna Niwa, Dział, Firlitówka, Fiszty, Fortepian, Głęboka, Górna Niwa, Grudna Kępska, Janikówka, Kamieniec, Kąty, Kolonia Libusza, Korczyna, Lechowe Potoki, Libusza, Łukowice, Maśluchowice, Nagórze, Padoły, Pasternik, Piekło, Pisarzówka, Podskale, Pola, Półrole, Racławice, Równia, Równie, Rożnowice, Rzeki, Serwoniec, Sitnica, Stawiska, Strzeszyn, Szczegominy, Ukraina, Wielki Potok, Wilczak, Wygon, Wyręby, Zagórze, Zaropie and Zielona Ulica.

== Neighbouring gminas ==
Gmina Biecz is bordered by the gminas of Gorlice, Lipinki, Moszczenica, Rzepiennik Strzyżewski, Skołyszyn and Szerzyny.
