= Babiniec =

Babiniec refers to:

- Babiniec, Lesser Poland Voivodeship
- Babiniec, Łódź Voivodeship

== See also ==
- Babinec (disambiguation)
- Babinets (disambiguation)
