= Stróżówka =

- Village
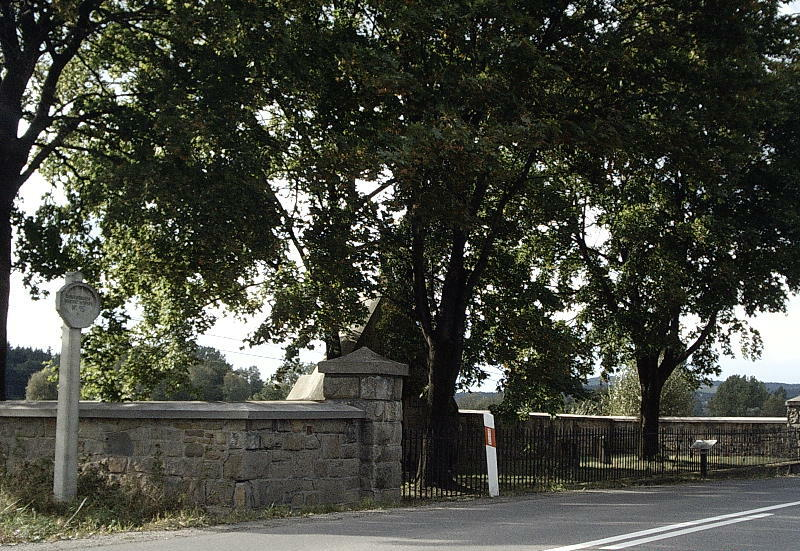
- War cemetery

- Location within Poland
- Coordinates: 49°41′N 21°8′E
- Country: Poland
- Voivodeship: Lesser Poland
- County: Gorlice
- Gmina: Gorlice
- Population: 1,500

Stróżówka [struˈʐufka] is a village in the administrative district of Gmina Gorlice, within Gorlice County, Lesser Poland Voivodeship, in southern Poland.

== History ==
In 1940, the Nazis created a ghetto in Bobowa. In October 1941, a ghetto was established in the nearby town, Gorlice. Jews from this city and neighboring villages were all gathered there. Deportations to Bełżec extermination camp and mass executions started in the spring of 1942. On 14 August 1942 Jews from Gorlice and Bobowa arrived in Strozowka. All these Jews, about 700 were shot on the so-called presbytery square and in the Garbacz forest near Stróżówka. The selection of others took place near the road. Elderly and sick people were put aside. Young people were still useful. The Jews were led to the pit by young Polish men from Baudienst whom the Nazis forced to drink alcohol and help them during the execution process.
