= Aleksander Kosiba =

Polish geographer, geophysicist, glaciologist, and climatologist

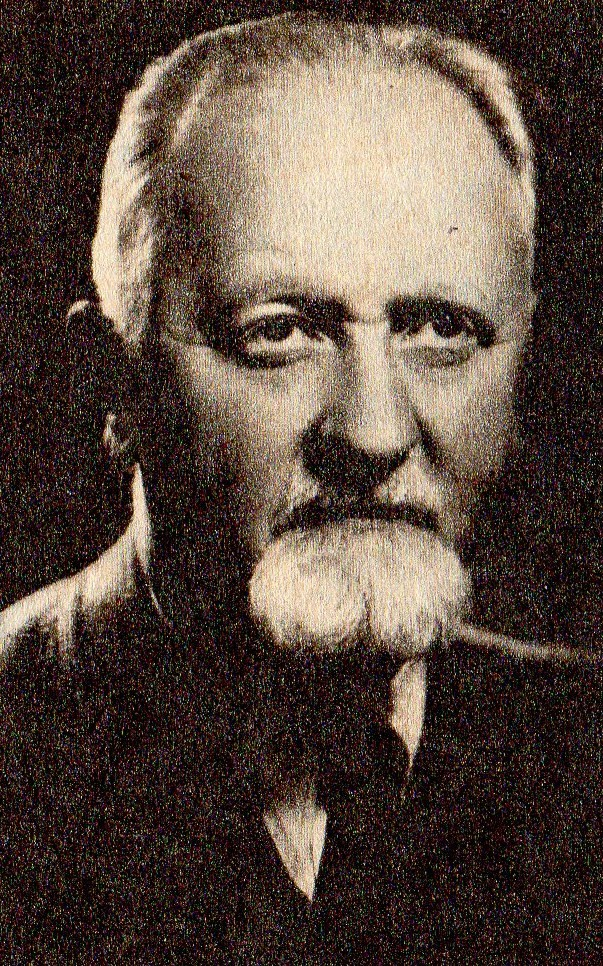
- Alexander Kosiba. Polish geographer.
- Born: 18 January 1901; Poland
- Died: 18 September 1981 (aged 80)
- Occupations: Geographer and glaciologist

Aleksander Kosiba (born 18 January 1901 in Libusza — died 18 September 1981 in Wrocław) was a Polish geographer, geophysicist, glaciologist and climatologist.

Kosiba's undergraduate tertiary studies were at the then Jan Kazimierz University.

He was an honorary member of Norwegian Geographical Society. Kosiba was involved in a Greenland expedition in 1934 by Denmark. There he worked for five months - May to September. In 1978 he published his last scientific work, "The snow, glaciers — ice sheets."
