= John Talley (politician) =

American politician

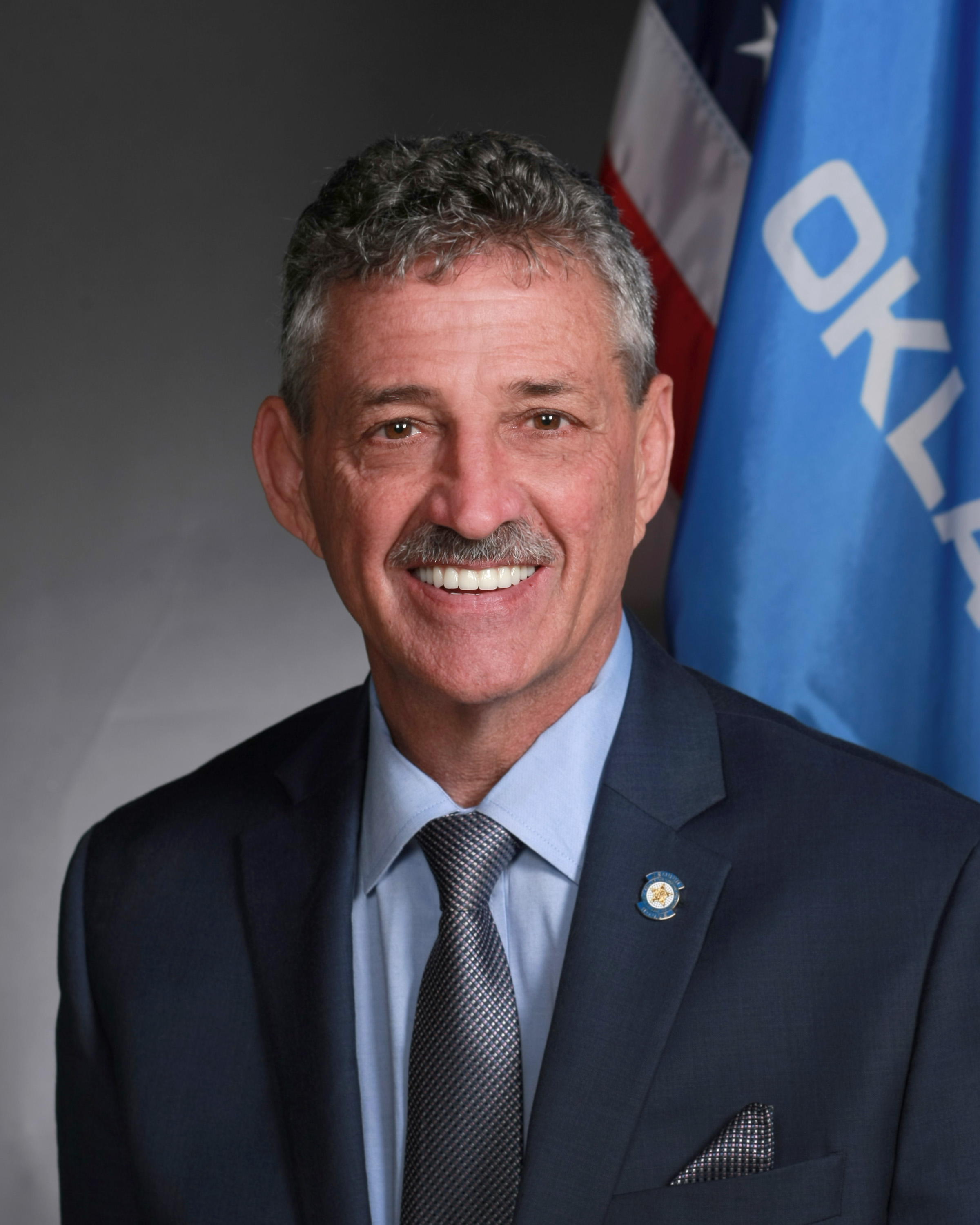

Member of the Oklahoma House of Representatives from the 33rd district
- In office January 14, 2019 – November 20, 2024
- Preceded by: Greg Babinec
- Succeeded by: Molly Jenkins

Personal details
- Born: John Thomas Talley
- Party: Republican
- Education: Oklahoma State University–Stillwater (BA)

John Thomas Talley is an American politician and minister who served as a member of the Oklahoma House of Representatives representing the 33rd district from 2019 to 2024.

== Early life and education ==
Talley was raised in Anadarko, Oklahoma. He earned a Bachelor of Arts degree in agriculture education from Oklahoma State University–Stillwater, where he was a member of the Oklahoma State Cowboys wrestling team.

== Career ==
Talley became an ordained minister in 1978. He has since worked as the chaplain of the Stillwater Police Department and Oklahoma State Cowboys football team. He was elected to the Oklahoma House of Representatives in November 2018 and assumed office on January 14, 2019. He also serves as vice chair of the House Children, Youth & Family Services Committee. In July 2021, Talley was selected to manage an interim House committee tasked with investigating clinical outcomes of patients following legislation that reduced opioid prescribing.
