= Pasternik, Lesser Poland Voivodeship =

Pasternik
- Village
- Location within Poland
- Coordinates: 49°41′32″N 21°14′41″E
- Country: Poland
- Voivodeship: Lesser Poland
- County: Gorlice
- Gmina: Biecz

Pasternik [pasˈtɛrnik] is a village in the administrative district of Gmina Biecz, within Gorlice County, Lesser Poland Voivodeship, in southern Poland.
