= Gmina Lipinki =

Gmina Lipinki Lipinki Commune
- Gmina
- Coat of arms
- Interactive map of Gmina Lipinki
- Coordinates (Lipinki): 49°40′45″N 21°18′0″E
- Country: Poland
- Voivodeship: Lesser Poland
- County: Gorlice
- Seat: Lipinki

Area
  - Total: 66.16 km^{2} (25.54 sq mi)

Population (2006)
  - Total: 6,807
  - Density: 102.9/km^{2} (266.5/sq mi)
- Website: http://www.lipinki.powiat.gorlice.pl

Gmina Lipinki is a rural gmina (administrative district) in Gorlice County, Lesser Poland Voivodeship, in southern Poland. Its seat is the village of Lipinki, which lies approximately 11 kilometres (7 mi) east of Gorlice and 107 km (66 mi) south-east of the regional capital Kraków.

The gmina covers an area of 66.16 square kilometres (25.5 sq mi), and as of 2006 its total population is 6,807.

== Villages ==
Gmina Lipinki contains the villages and settlements of Bednarka, Bednarskie, Kryg, Lipinki, Pogorzyna, Rozdziele and Wójtowa.

== Neighbouring gminas ==
Gmina Lipinki is bordered by the gminas of Biecz, Dębowiec, Gorlice, Jasło, Sękowa and Skołyszyn.
