= Stawiska, Lesser Poland Voivodeship =

Stawiska
- Settlement
- Location within Poland
- Coordinates: 49°45′38″N 21°10′36″E
- Country: Poland
- Voivodeship: Lesser Poland
- County: Gorlice
- Gmina: Biecz

Stawiska [staˈviska] is a settlement in the administrative district of Gmina Biecz, within Gorlice County, Lesser Poland Voivodeship, in southern Poland.
