= Lipinki, Lesser Poland Voivodeship =

Lipinki
- Village
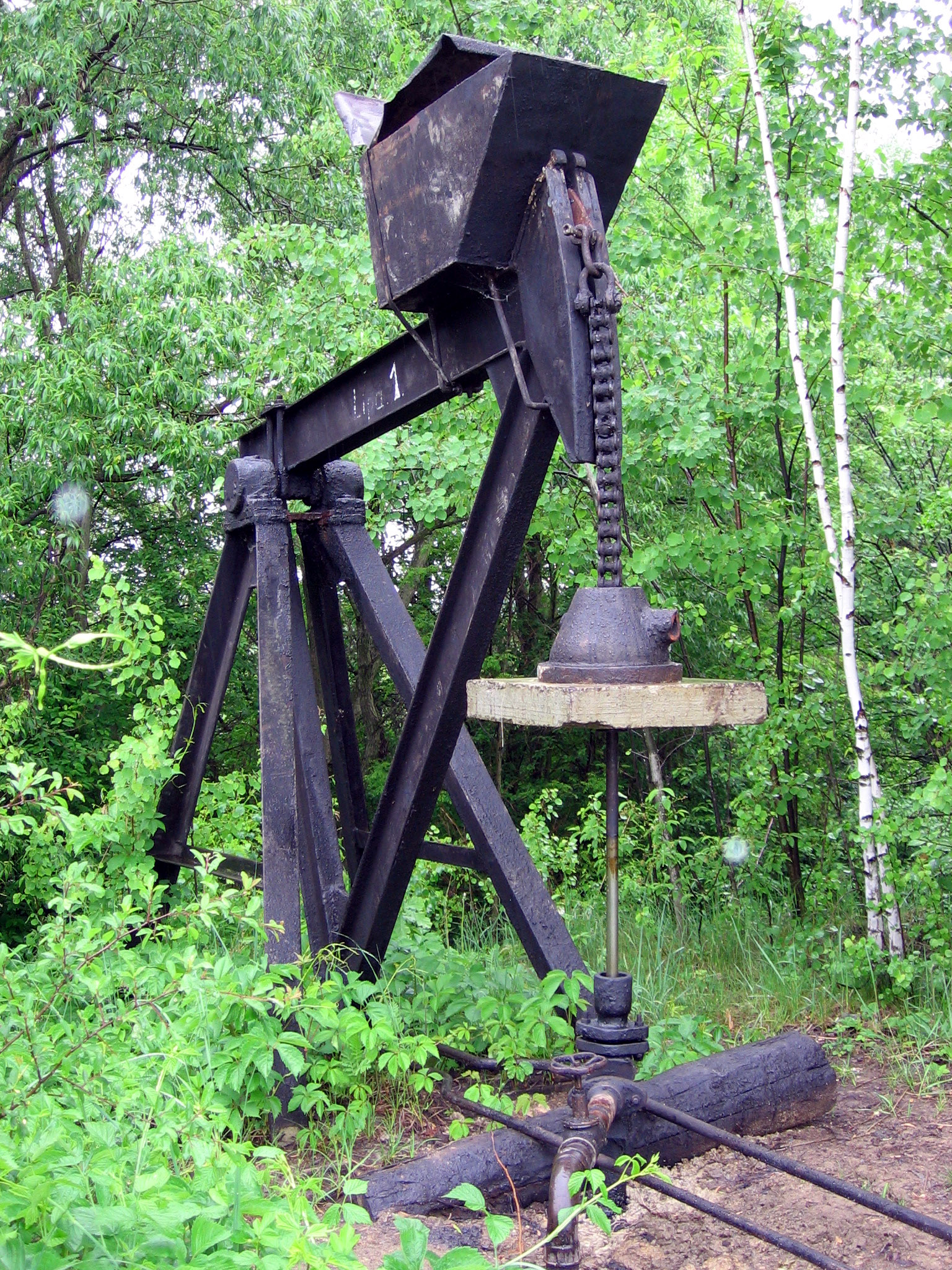
- Oil rig "Dziadek" in Lipinki

- Location within Poland
- Coordinates: 49°40′45″N 21°18′0″E
- Country: Poland
- Voivodeship: Lesser Poland
- County: Gorlice
- Gmina: Lipinki
- Population: 2,400
- Website: https://www.e-lipinki.pl

Lipinki [lʲiˈpʲiŋkʲi] is a village in Gorlice County, Lesser Poland Voivodeship, in southern Poland. It is the seat of the gmina (administrative district) called Gmina Lipinki.

== History ==
As a result of the first of Partitions of Poland (Treaty of St-Petersburg dated 5 July 1772), the Galicia area was attributed to the Habsburg Monarchy. For more details, see the article Kingdom of Galicia and Lodomeria.

A postoffice was opened in 1890, under the Bezirkshauptmannschaft Gorlice.

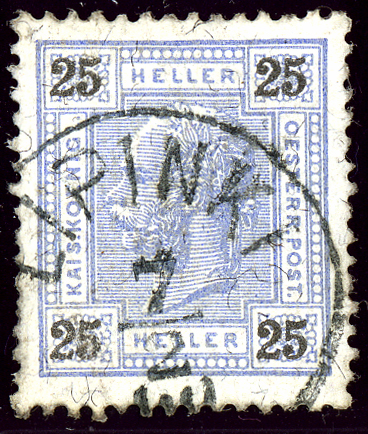
Austrian KK 25 heller stamp, cancelled LIPINKI in 1900
