= Moszczenica, Gorlice County =

Moszczenica
- Village
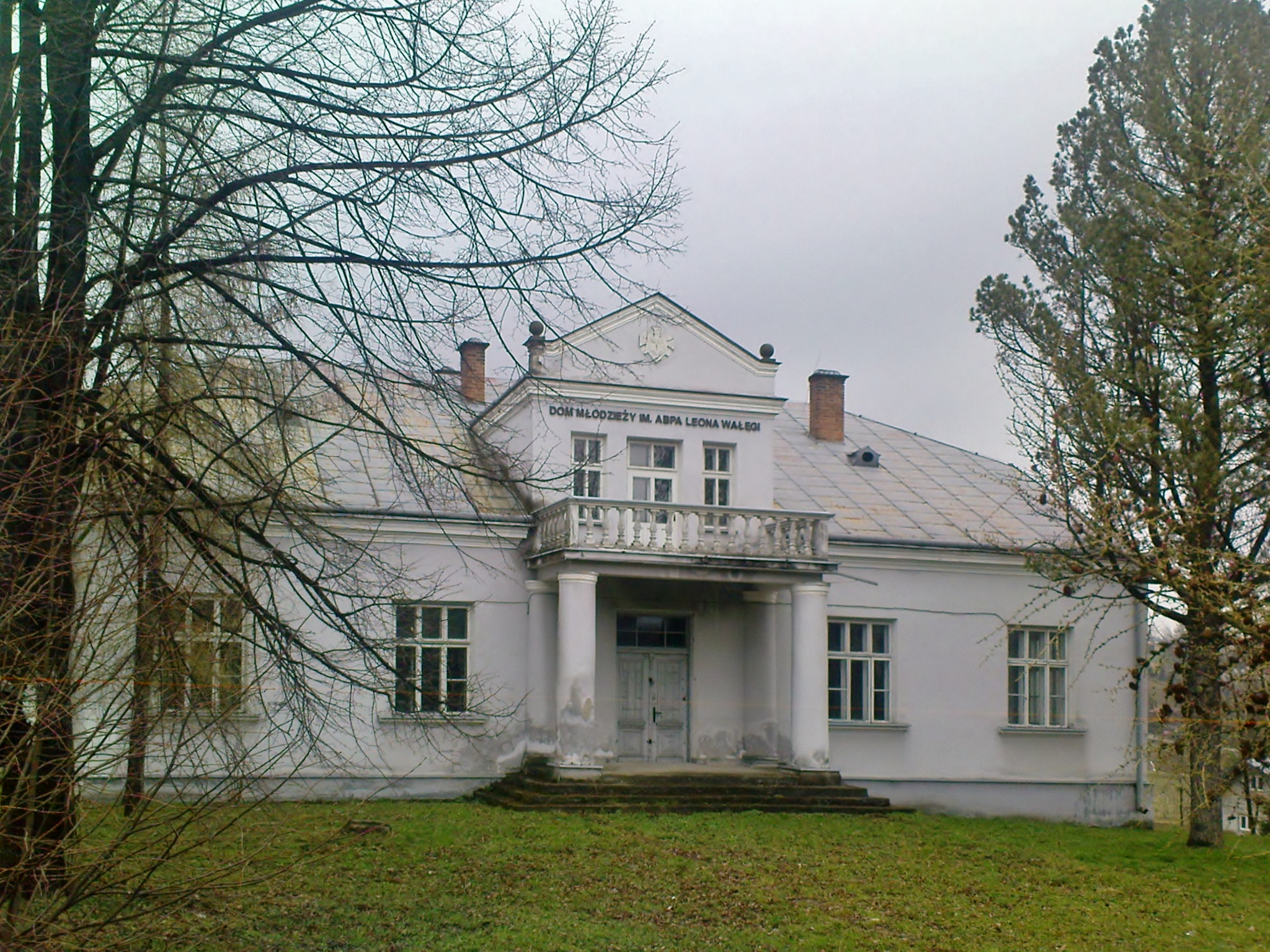

- Location within Poland
- Coordinates: 49°43′17″N 21°6′32″E
- Country: Poland
- Voivodeship: Lesser Poland
- County: Gorlice
- Gmina: Moszczenica
- Population: 4,706

Moszczenica [mɔʂt͡ʂɛˈɲit͡sa] is a village in Gorlice County, Lesser Poland Voivodeship, in southern Poland. It is the seat of the gmina (administrative district) called Gmina Moszczenica.
