= Kobylanka, Lesser Poland Voivodeship =

Kobylanka
- Village
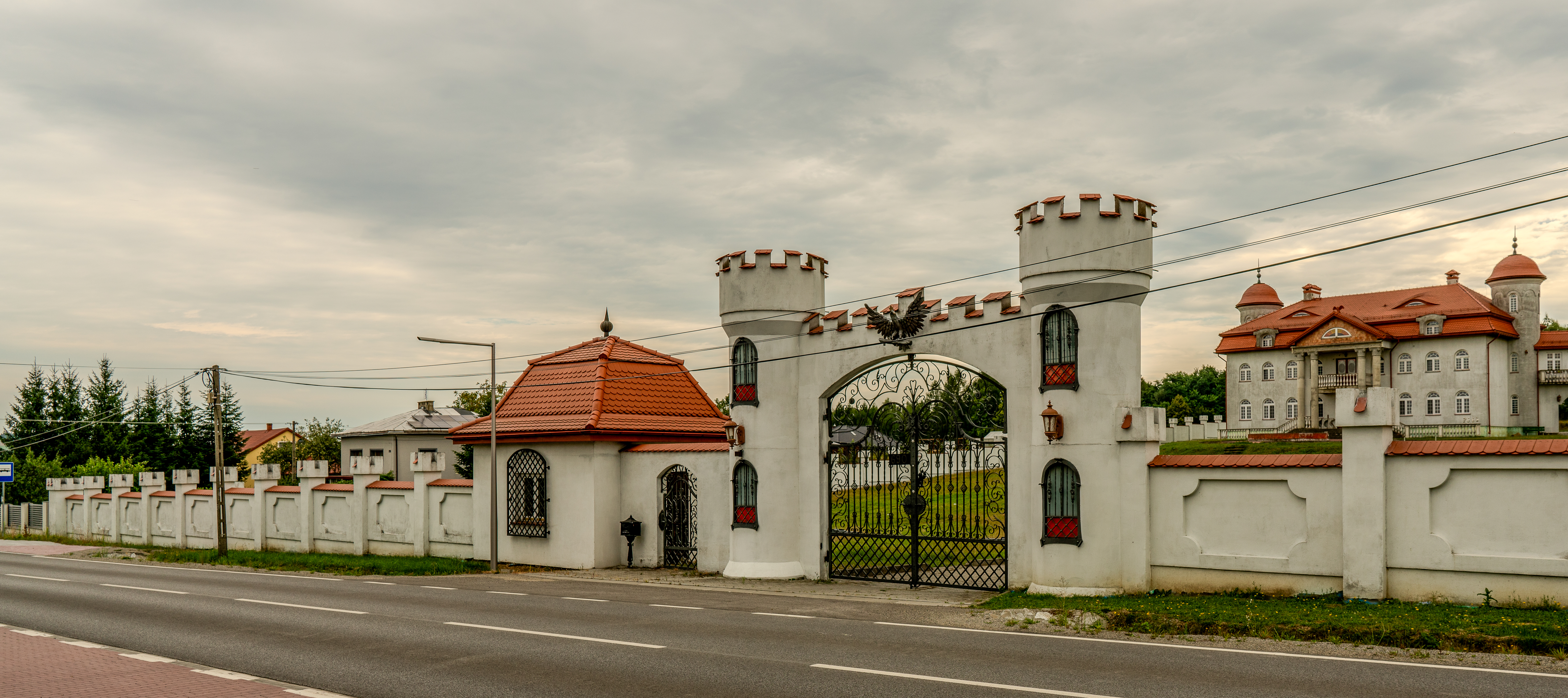
- Castle

- Location within Poland
- Coordinates: 49°39′59″N 21°13′16″E
- Country: Poland
- Voivodeship: Lesser Poland
- County: Gorlice
- Gmina: Gorlice

Kobylanka [kɔbɨˈlanka] is a village in the administrative district of Gmina Gorlice, within Gorlice County, Lesser Poland Voivodeship, in southern Poland.
