= Gmina Gorlice =

Gmina Gorlice Gorlice Commune
- Gmina
- Flag Coat of arms
- Interactive map of Gmina Gorlice
- Coordinates (Gorlice): 49°39′N 21°10′E
- Country: Poland
- Voivodeship: Lesser Poland
- County: Gorlice
- Seat: Gorlice

Area
  - Total: 103.43 km^{2} (39.93 sq mi)

Population (2006)
  - Total: 16,179
  - Density: 156.42/km^{2} (405.14/sq mi)
- Website: http://www.gmina.gorlice.pl/

Gmina Gorlice is a rural gmina (administrative district) in Gorlice County, Lesser Poland Voivodeship, in southern Poland. Its seat is the town of Gorlice, although the town is not part of the territory of the gmina.

The gmina covers an area of 103.43 square kilometres (39.9 sq mi), and as of 2006 its total population is 16,179.

== Villages ==
Gmina Gorlice contains the villages and settlements of Bielanka, Bystra, Dominikowice, Klęczany, Kobylanka, Kwiatonowice, Stróżówka, Szymbark and Zagórzany.

== Neighbouring gminas ==
Gmina Gorlice is bordered by the town of Gorlice and by the gminas of Biecz, Grybów, Lipinki, Łużna, Moszczenica, Ropa, Sękowa and Uście Gorlickie.
