= Molly Jenkins =

American politician

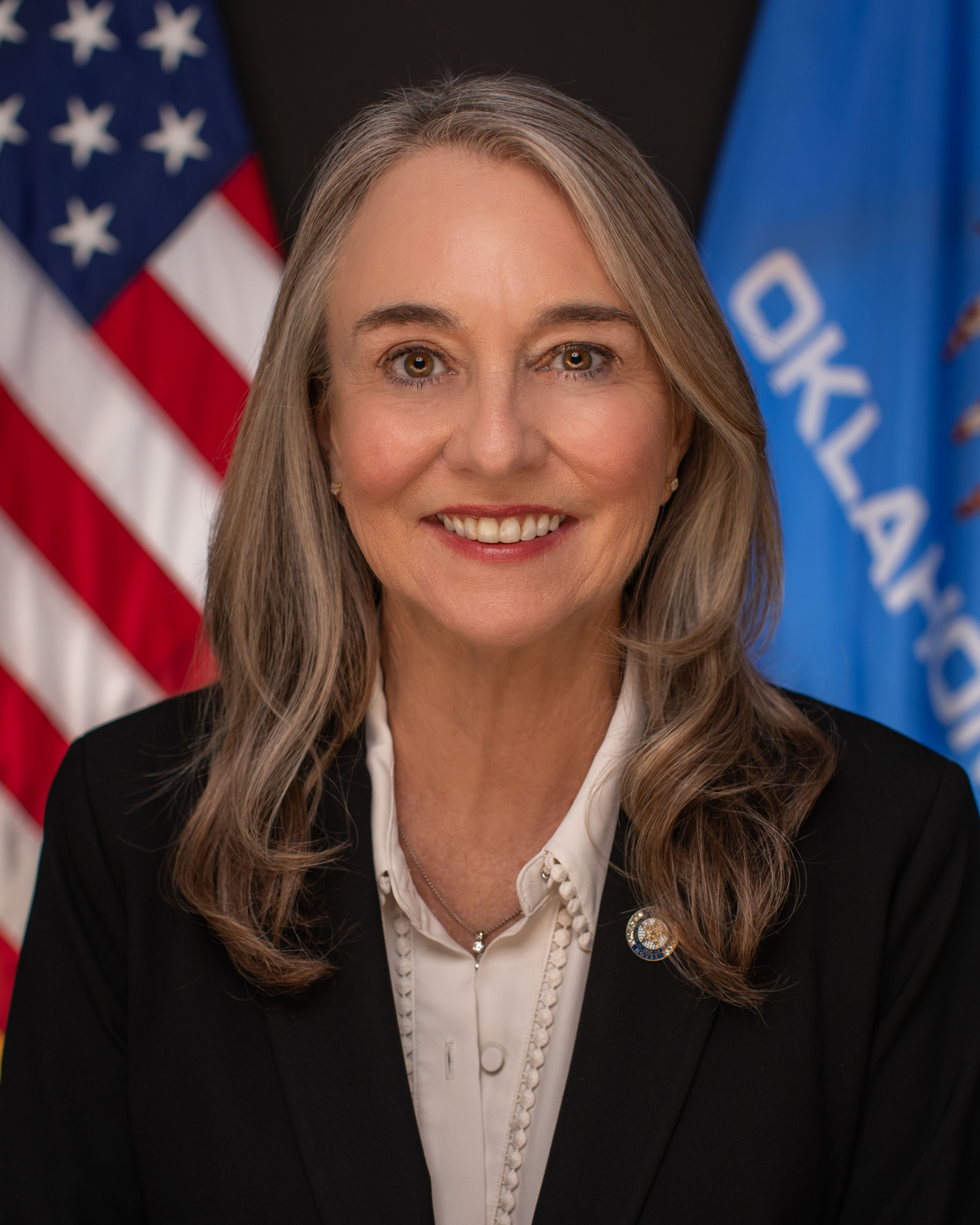
- Jenkins in 2024

Member of the Oklahoma House of Representatives from the 33rd district
- Incumbent
- Assumed office November 20, 2024
- Preceded by: John Talley

Personal details
- Party: Republican
- Education: Oklahoma State University; University of Central Oklahoma

Molly Jenkins is an American politician who has served in the Oklahoma House of Representatives representing the 33rd district since 2024.

== Career ==
Molly Jenkins is from Coyle, Oklahoma. She earned a bachelor's degree from Oklahoma State University and a master's degree from the University of Central Oklahoma. She taught English for 12 years at Putnam City Schools and Madill Public Schools and worked as a real estate broker. She lives on a seventy-acre farm.

== Oklahoma House ==
Jenkins defeated incumbent John Talley in the 2024 Republican primary election winning with over 60% of the vote.
