= Rożnowice, Lesser Poland Voivodeship =

Rożnowice
- Village
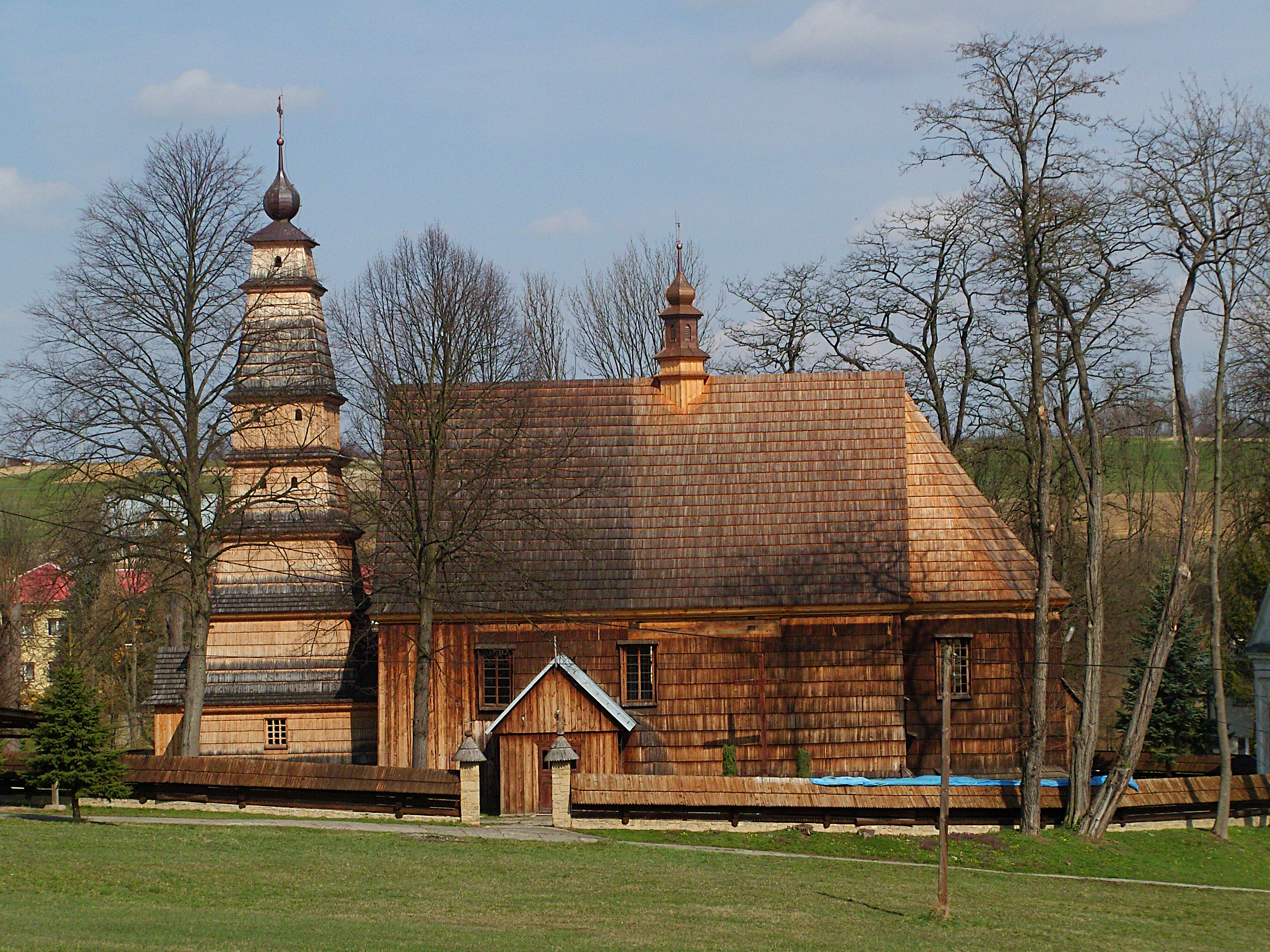
- Saint Andrew church

- Location within Poland
- Coordinates: 49°45′23″N 21°9′35″E
- Country: Poland
- Voivodeship: Lesser Poland
- County: Gorlice
- Gmina: Biecz
- Population: 1,436

Rożnowice [rɔʐnɔˈvit͡sɛ] is a village in the administrative district of Gmina Biecz, within Gorlice County, Lesser Poland Voivodeship, in southern Poland.
