= Równia, Lesser Poland Voivodeship =

Równia
- Village
- Location within Poland
- Coordinates: 49°45′34″N 21°12′7″E
- Country: Poland
- Voivodeship: Lesser Poland
- County: Gorlice
- Gmina: Biecz

Równia [ˈruvɲa] is a village in the administrative district of Gmina Biecz, within Gorlice County, Lesser Poland Voivodeship, in southern Poland.
