= Sitnica, Lesser Poland Voivodeship =

Sitnica
- Village
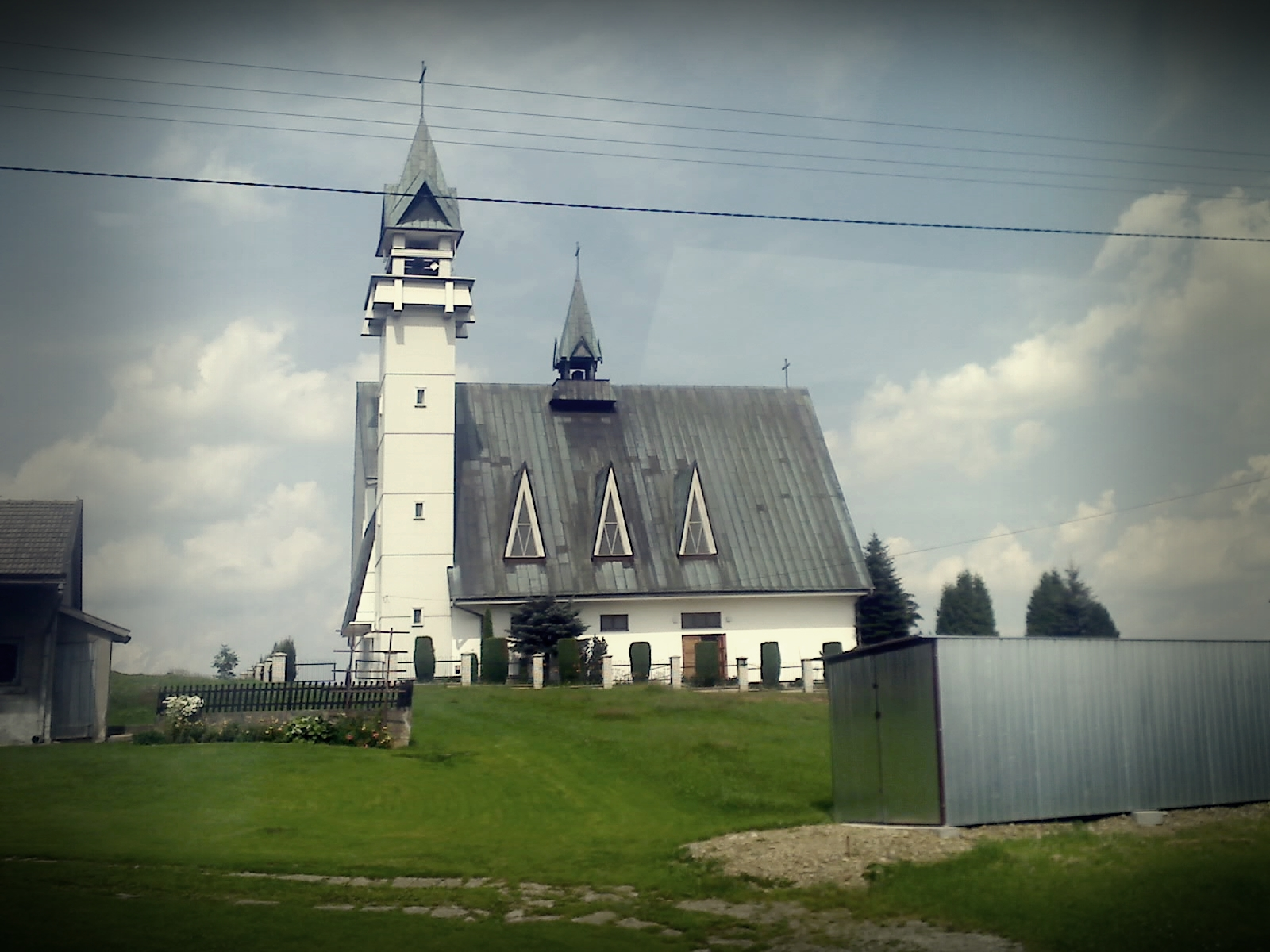
- Catholic church

- Location within Poland
- Coordinates: 49°45′35″N 21°7′5″E
- Country: Poland
- Voivodeship: Lesser Poland
- County: Gorlice
- Gmina: Biecz

Sitnica [ɕitˈnit͡sa] is a village in the administrative district of Gmina Biecz, within Gorlice County, Lesser Poland Voivodeship, in southern Poland.
