= Racławice, Gorlice County =

Racławice
- Village
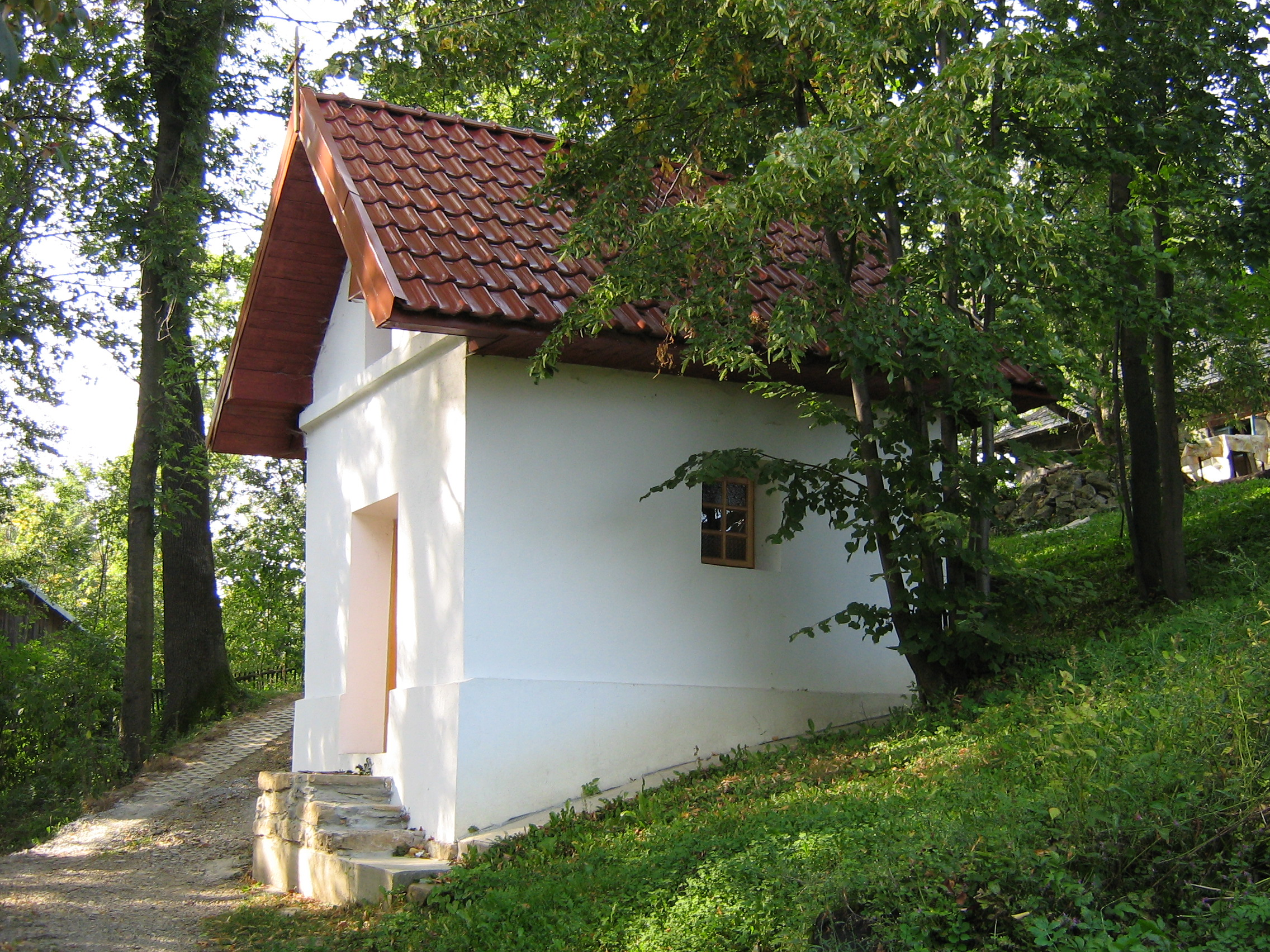
- Chapel

- Location within Poland
- Coordinates: 49°45′N 21°12′E
- Country: Poland
- Voivodeship: Lesser Poland
- County: Gorlice
- Gmina: Biecz
- Population: 880

Racławice [rat͡swaˈvit͡sɛ] is a village in the administrative district of Gmina Biecz, within Gorlice County, Lesser Poland Voivodeship, in southern Poland.
