= Nagórze, Lesser Poland Voivodeship =

Nagórze
- Settlement
- Location within Poland
- Coordinates: 49°45′20″N 21°8′45″E
- Country: Poland
- Voivodeship: Lesser Poland
- County: Gorlice
- Gmina: Biecz

Nagórze [naˈɡuʐɛ] is a settlement in the administrative district of Gmina Biecz, within Gorlice County, Lesser Poland Voivodeship, in southern Poland.
