= Gmina Moszczenica, Lesser Poland Voivodeship =

Gmina Moszczenica Moszczenica Commune
- Gmina
- Coat of arms
- Interactive map of Gmina Moszczenica
- Coordinates (Moszczenica): 49°43′17″N 21°6′32″E
- Country: Poland
- Voivodeship: Lesser Poland
- County: Gorlice
- Seat: Moszczenica

Area
  - Total: 37.6 km^{2} (14.5 sq mi)

Population (2006)
  - Total: 4,711
  - Density: 125/km^{2} (325/sq mi)
- Website: gminamoszczenica.eu

Gmina Moszczenica is a rural gmina (administrative district) in Gorlice County, Lesser Poland Voivodeship, in southern Poland. Its seat is the village of Moszczenica, which lies approximately 9 kilometres (6 mi) north-west of Gorlice and 93 km (58 mi) south-east of the regional capital Kraków. The gmina also includes the village of Staszkówka.

The gmina covers an area of 37.6 square kilometres (14.5 sq mi), and as of 2011 its total population is 4,856.

== Neighbouring gminas ==
Gmina Moszczenica is bordered by the gminas of Biecz, Ciężkowice, Gorlice, Łużna and Rzepiennik Strzyżewski.
