= Greg Babinec =

American politician (born 1962)

Gregory P. Babinec

Member of the Oklahoma House of Representatives from the 33rd district
- In office November 17, 2016 – November 15, 2018
- Preceded by: Lee Denney
- Succeeded by: John Talley

Personal details
- Born: June 24, 1962 (age 64)
- Party: Republican
- Education: Indiana University–Purdue University Indianapolis (graduated 1981)

Gregory P. Babinec (born June 24, 1962) is an American politician who served in the Oklahoma House of Representatives from the 33rd district from 2016 to 2018. In 2018, he ran for re-election but was defeated in the Republican primary.

== Political career ==
Babinec ran for the District 33 seat for the Oklahoma House of Representatives in 2016 as a Republican. His two main opponents were Caryl Talley, running as a Democrat; and Erin Adams, running as a Libertarian. In the general election, he won with 7594 (52.2%) votes. The main theme of his campaign was to differentiate himself from the other candidates, saying "I'm not a lawyer or a career politician. I'm a businessman [...] I come from a small town and I’m proud of that fact." He claimed that this background made him the ideal candidate to fix the state's budget, grow the economy, and improve the educational system.

While in office, he sponsored four bills: HB 1496, pertaining to economic relief for rural small business owners; HB 1497, which would make adjustments to, and prove exemptions for, taxable income; HB 1498, a proposed amendment to a previous bill from 2011 which "relates to scope, organization and definitions; clarifying language; and providing an effective date."; and HB 1499, pertaining to transferring assets from one governmental organization to another. All four bills died in committee and none were passed into law. He also served on the public safety, appropriations & budget, general government oversight and accountability, and judiciary committees.

Babinec ran for re-election in 2018. In the Republican primary election held on June 26 he received 1502 votes (25.86%), losing to John Talley.

== Personal life ==
Babinec was born in 1962 to Gene and Victoria Babinec (née Simpson). His first job was at McDonald's, where he started in 1978 and was promoted to manager before taking on a corporate role for the company. In 1995, he moved to Oklahoma, and purchased his first McDonald's franchise location shortly thereafter. In subsequent years, he purchased two additional locations in Cushing and the surrounding area.

Babinec met his wife Shanda while they were coworkers at McDonald's. They were married c. 1985 and have two children.
