= Babinets, Komarichsky District, Bryansk Oblast =

Babinets Бабинец
- Village
- Location within Bryansk Oblast Location within Russia
- Coordinates: 52°31′N 34°42′E
- Country: Russia
- Region: Bryansk Oblast
- District: Komarichsky District
- Time zone: UTC+3:00

Babinets (Russian: Ба́бинец) is a rural locality (a village) in Komarichsky District, Bryansk Oblast, Russia. The population was 6 as of 2010. There is 1 street.

== Geography ==
Babinets is located 13 km northwest of Komarichi (the district's administrative centre) by road. Tulichevo is the nearest rural locality.
