= Babinec, Slovakia =

Babinec Babarét
- Municipality
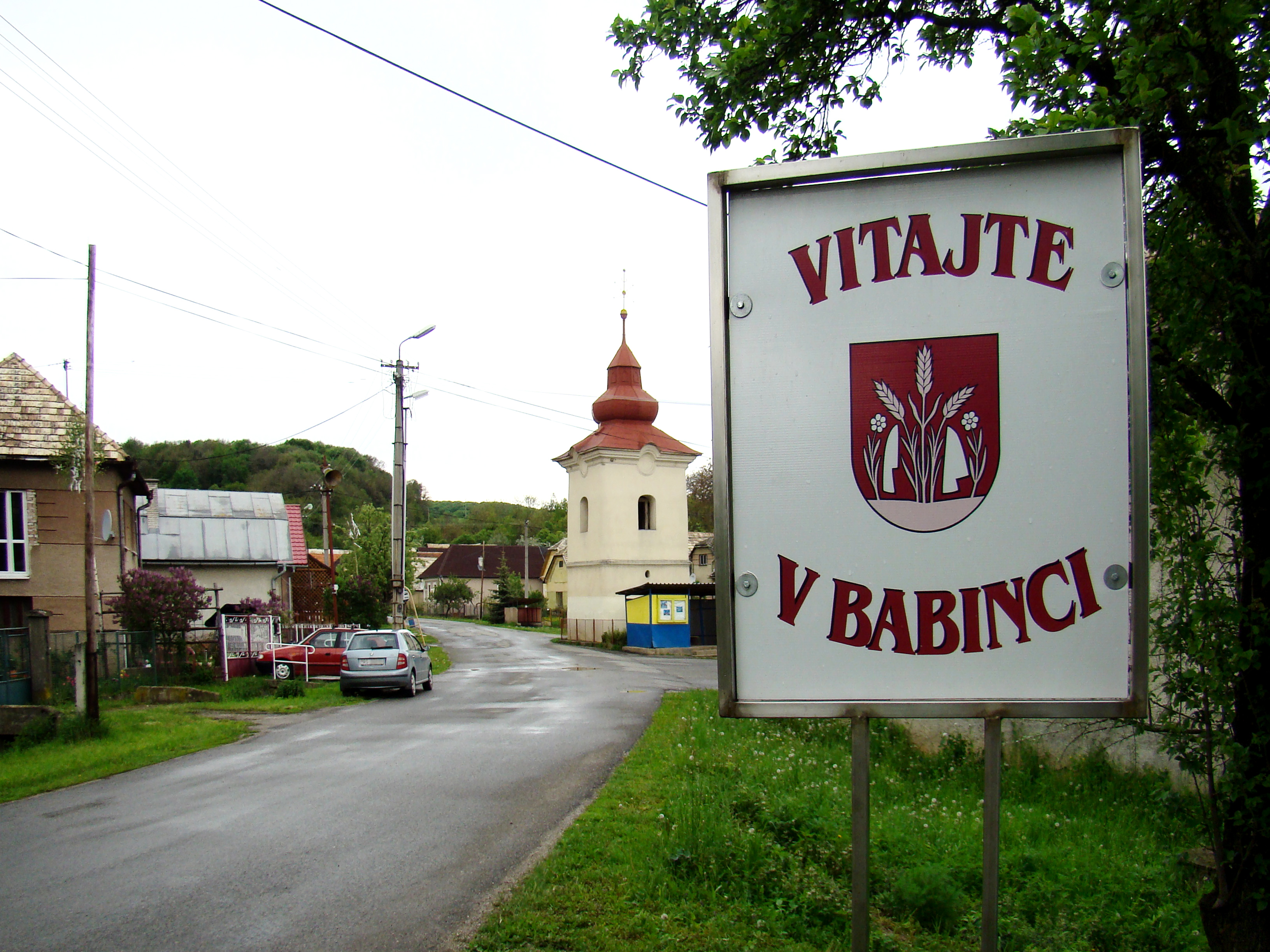
- Sign Vitajte v Babinci (Welcome to The Place of Girls, Women)

- Flag

- Location of Babinec in the Banská Bystrica Region Location of Babinec in Slovakia
- Coordinates: 48°30′43″N 20°00′17″E
- Country: Slovakia
- Region: Banská Bystrica Region
- District: Rimavská Sobota District
- First mentioned: 1407

Area
  - Total: 4.91 km^{2} (1.90 sq mi)
- Elevation: 423 m (1,388 ft)

Population (2025)
  - Total: 66
- Time zone: UTC+1 (CET)
  - Summer (DST): UTC+2 (CEST)
- Postal code: 980 26
- Area code: +421 47
- Vehicle registration plate (until 2022): RS
- Website: www.babinec.info

Babinec (Hungarian: Babarét) is a village and municipality in the Rimavská Sobota District of the Banská Bystrica Region of Slovakia. Locals are now engaged in agriculture and fruit growing. The village is home to a classical Lutheran church from the 18th century.

== Geography ==
The municipality lies at an altitude of 423 metres (1,388 ft) and covers an area of 4.91 km^{2} (1.90 sq mi) (2025).

== History ==
A Bronze Age treasure has been excavated in the village. The current village arose in the 13th century from an older settlement. In historical records the village was first mentioned in 1407 as Babalawka. It belonged to the noble families Derencsényi and Széchy. In the 17th century it passed to the Muráň town. Inhabitants had been engaged in agriculture and fruit growing, in winter in basketry and in production of tools for agriculture and weaving.

== Etymology ==
The village belongs to places with quaint names in Slovakia. In Slovak, Babinec "A place of girls, women". Even today in there are more women than men in the village. Every year the mayor organises a gathering of people with the surname Babinec.

== Population ==
Population statistic (10 years)
Year	1995	2005	2015	2025
Count	100	77	71	66
Difference		−23%	−7.79%	−7.04%

Population statistic
Year	2024	2025
Count	66	66
Difference		+0%

It has a population of 66 people (31 December 2025).

=== Ethnicity ===
Census 2021 (1+ %)
Ethnicity	Number	Fraction
Slovak	59	98.33%
Not found out	1	1.66%
Total	60	

In year 2021 was 60 people by ethnicity 59 as Slovak and 1 as Not found out.

Note on population: The difference values of population numbers in the table "Population statistic" and in the sections "Ethnicity" & "Religion" is caused by the use of various statistical methods.

=== Religion ===
Census 2021 (1+ %)
Religion	Number	Fraction
Evangelical Church	27	45%
None	19	31.67%
Roman Catholic Church	11	18.33%
Not found out	1	1.67%
Greek Catholic Church	1	1.67%
Ad hoc movements	1	1.67%
Total	60	

In year 2021 was 60 people by religion 27 from Evangelical Church, 19 from None, 11 from Roman Catholic Church, 1 from Not found out, 1 from Greek Catholic Church and 1 from Ad hoc movements.

== Genealogical resources ==
The records for genealogical research are available at the state archive in Banská Bystrica (Slovak: Štátny archív v Banskej Bystrici).

- Roman Catholic church records (births/marriages/deaths): 1769-1851
- Lutheran church records (births/marriages/deaths): 1770-1866 (parish: B), 1867-1896 (parish: C)
- Census records 1869 of Babinec are not available at the state archive.

== See also ==
- List of municipalities and towns in Slovakia
