= Libusza =

- Village
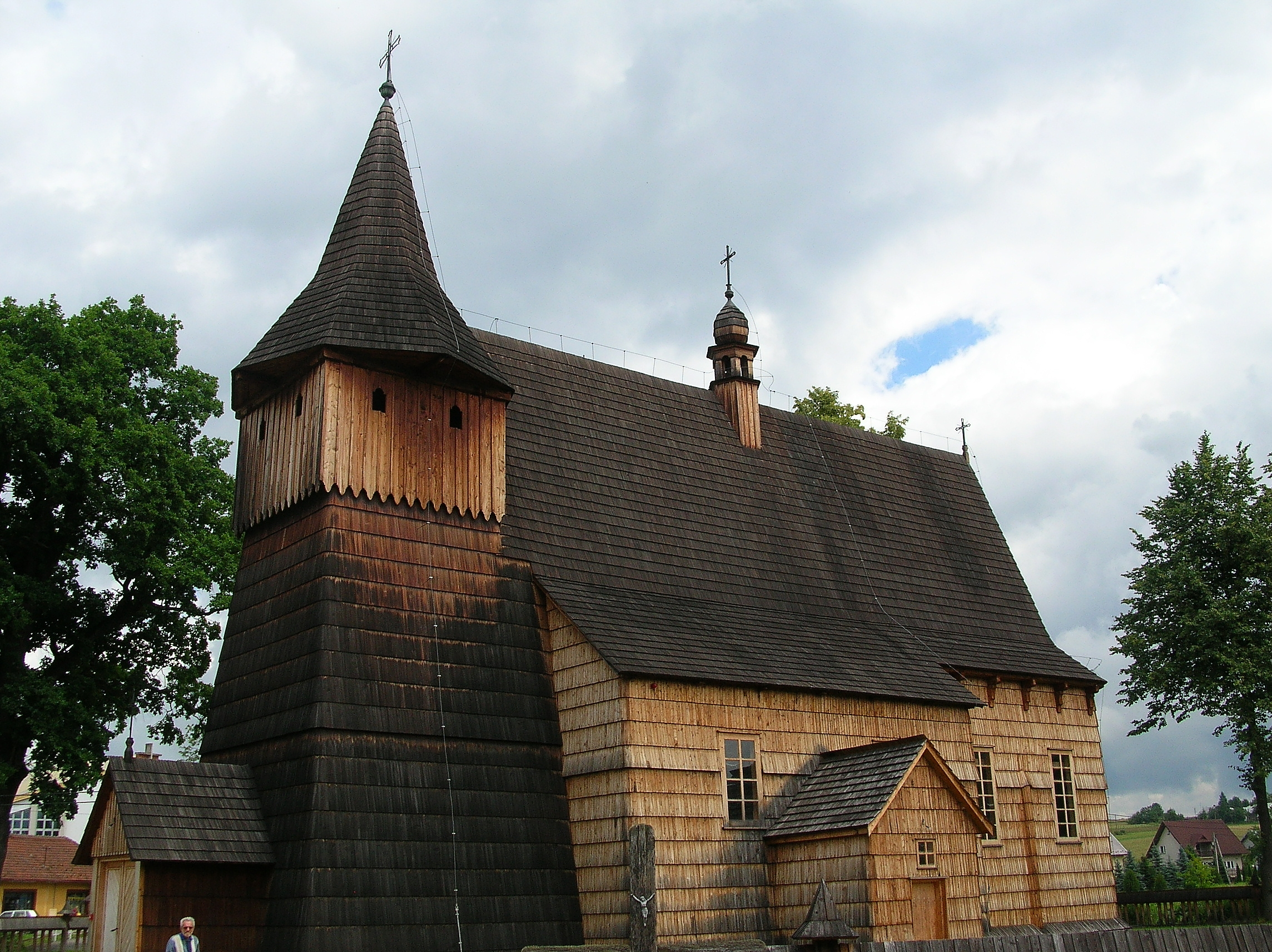
- Church

- Location within Poland
- Coordinates: 49°41′N 21°16′E
- Country: Poland
- Voivodeship: Lesser Poland
- County: Gorlice
- Gmina: Biecz
- Highest elevation: 300 m (980 ft)
- Lowest elevation: 262 m (860 ft)
- Population (approx.): 3,240

Libusza [liˈbuʂa] is a village in the administrative district of Gmina Biecz, within Gorlice County, Lesser Poland Voivodeship, in southern Poland.

The village has an approximate population of 3,240.
