= Susan Babinec =

American scientist

Susan Jean Babinec
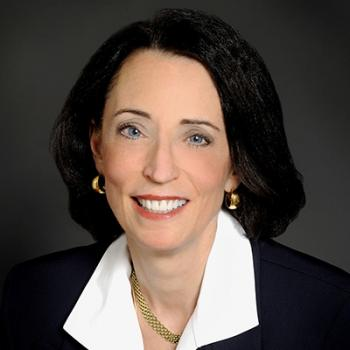
- Education: University of Wisconsin
- Known for: Energy storage
- Scientific career
- Workplaces: United States Department of Energy; Dow Chemical Company; Argonne National Laboratory

Susan Jean Babinec is an American scientist. She is Program Lead for Stationary Storage within the Argonne Collaborative Center for Energy Storage Science (ACCESS) at the Argonne National Laboratory. She looks to develop a future electric grid for the United States.

== Biography ==
Susan Babinec works as a leader for the U.S. Department of Energy (DOE) to optimize the future of electrical grid energy storage. She served as a senior commercialization advisor for both transportation and energy storage at the Advanced Research Projects Agency - Energy (ARPA-E). Early in her career, she was awarded the Young Inventor of the Year by Dow Chemical Company. Babinec also holds about 45 patents for her inventions towards bettering energy storage and has authored and co-authored dozens of articles and book chapters.

== Early life and education ==
Babinec completed a bachelor's degree in chemistry at the University of Wisconsin. She later obtained a master's degree in physical science from Michigan State University. These degrees in physical science and chemistry gave Babinec the knowledge she needed for her future in pursuing electrochemistry and energy storage.

== Research and career ==
Babinec spent the first twenty years of her career at Dow Chemical Company, where she worked as a senior electrochemist. As a technical director, Babinec led a multitude of research groups for A123 Systems, Inc, at the Ann Arbor, Michigan location. She was honored as Inventor of the Year, and the first woman corporate fellow. At Dow, Babinec worked on cathode electrodes for lithium-ion batteries. She investigated how the binder and porosity of the electrodes impacted the electrochemical and mechanical properties. She co-invented a low-cost display technology that became a venture-funded start-up. She became frustrated by Dow's lack of investment in new technologies, and moved to A123, a company who were pursuing new battery materials. When A123 found a defect in one of their batteries, they were forced to recall products, which resulted in the company going bankrupt.

Babinec joined the United States Department of Energy ARPA-E program that looked to support energy projects. During her six years at ARPA-E, Babinec invested $120 million into battery companies, including Natron Energy, Sila Nanotechnologies and Ion Storage Systems.

In 2019, Babinec was appointed to Argonne National Laboratory's grid energy storage program. She looks to optimize energy storage capabilities by integrating grid design with industry needs. To better understand battery materials, she developed rapid life cycle evaluations and pioneered the use of artificial intelligence. She launched the Battery Data Genome project, a challenge to collect, store and share usable information from every stage of the battery lifecycle. The Battery Data Genome Project looks to transform understanding about electric vehicles.

== Selected publications ==
- Albertus, Paul; Babinec, Susan; Litzelman, Scott; Newman, Aron (2017-12-18). "Status and challenges in enabling the lithium metal electrode for high-energy and low-cost rechargeable batteries". Nature Energy. 3 (1): 16–21. doi:10.1038/s41560-017-0047-2. ISSN 2058-7546. S2CID 256703528.
- Caldwell, W. Brett; Chen, Kaimin; Mirkin, Chad A.; Babinec, Susan J. (August 1993). "Self-assembled monolayer films of fullerene C60 on cysteamine-modified gold". Langmuir. 9 (8): 1945–1947. doi:10.1021/la00032a002. ISSN 0743-7463.

== Personal life ==
Babinec is married with two adult sons.
