= Gorlice County =

Gorlice County Powiat gorlicki
- County
- Flag Coat of arms

- Location within the voivodeship

- Division into gminas
- Coordinates (Gorlice): 49°39′N 21°10′E
- Country: Poland
- Voivodeship: Lesser Poland
- Seat: Gorlice
- Gminas: Total 10 (incl. 1 urban): Gorlice; Gmina Biecz; Gmina Bobowa; Gmina Gorlice; Gmina Lipinki; Gmina Łużna; Gmina Moszczenica; Gmina Ropa; Gmina Sękowa; Gmina Uście Gorlickie

Area
  - Total: 967.36 km^{2} (373.50 sq mi)

Population (2019)
  - Total: 116,865
  - Density: 120.81/km^{2} (312.89/sq mi)
  - Urban: 35,168
  - Rural: 81,697
- Car plates: KGR
- Website: www.powiat.gorlice.pl

Gorlice County (Polish: powiat gorlicki) is a unit of territorial administration and local government (powiat) in Lesser Poland Voivodeship, southern Poland, on the Slovak border. It was created on 1 January 1999 as a result of the Polish local government reforms passed in 1998. Its administrative seat and largest town is Gorlice, which lies 100 kilometres (62 mi) south-east of the regional capital Kraków. The only other towns in the county are Biecz, lying 12 km (7 mi) north-east of Gorlice, and Bobowa, 18 km (11 mi) west of Gorlice.

The county covers an area of 967.36 square kilometres (373.5 sq mi). As of 2019 its total population is 116,865, out of which the population of Gorlice is 27,442, that of Biecz is 4,590, that of Bobowa is 3,136, and the rural population is 81,697.

== Neighbouring counties ==
Gorlice County is bordered by Nowy Sącz County to the west, Tarnów County to the north and Jasło County to the east. It also borders Slovakia to the south.

== Administrative division ==
The county is subdivided into 10 gminas (one urban, two urban-rural and seven rural). These are listed in the following table, in descending order of population.

Gmina	Type	Area (km^{2})	Population (2019)	Seat
Gorlice	urban	23.6	27,442	
Gmina Gorlice	rural	103.4	17,270	Gorlice *
Gmina Moszczenica	rural	37.6	12,889	Moszczenica
Gmina Biecz	urban-rural	98.3	16,820	Biecz
Gmina Bobowa	urban-rural	49.8	9,790	Bobowa
Gmina Łużna	rural	56.2	8,517	Łużna
Gmina Lipinki	rural	66.2	6,798	Lipinki
Gmina Uście Gorlickie	rural	287.4	6,844	Uście Gorlickie
Gmina Ropa	rural	49.1	5,498	Ropa
Gmina Sękowa	rural	194.8	4,997	Sękowa
* seat not part of the gmina
