= Hans Caspar von Krockow =

Hans Caspar von Krockow (23 August 1700 – 25 February 1759) was a Prussian major general and commander of the Cuirassier Regiment No. 1. He was the Amtshauptmann of the Giebichenstein and Moritzburg estates as well as heir to Estate A at Peest (Pieszcz), Paalow (Pałowo), Franken, Thien (Tyń) and Nitzlin (Nosalin). He fought in the Seven Years' War and died of injuries received at the Battle of Hochkirch.

== Early life ==
Krockow was born in Peest. He was taught at home prior to attending the University of Halle. He did not complete his studies and opted to enter the military as a volunteer in Cuirassier Regiment No. 6.

== Military career ==
He quickly became an officer, and by 1738 had risen to the rank of major. In 1741 he was in the camp at Genthin and later at Gröningen. On 18 November 1741 he rose to the rank of lieutenant colonel. As the campaign of 1743, part of the War of the Austrian Succession, progressed, he briefly joined the Austrian army as a volunteer to fight against the French. Upon returning in 1745, he was promoted to the rank of colonel under Leopold von Anhalt. In October 1745 he became commander of the Cuirassier Regiment "von Buddenbrock" No. 1 and was appointed administrator of Giebichenstein and Moritzburg. On 8 December 1750, he was appointed major general and given a part of the knightly estate of Mahlendorf in Silesia.

In the Seven Years' War, he joined the army of Schwerin in Bohemia and moved to winter quarters in Silesia. In March 1757 General Field Marshal Wilhelm Dietrich von Buddenbrock died and Krockow became chief of Buddenbrock's old Cuirassier Regiment No. 1. He fought on 6 May 1757 in the Battle of Prague and on 18 June at Kolin. The regiment joined Frederick the Great's army in Lausitz, but later returned to Silesia to fight the Austrians with the Duke of Bevern. In the midst of battle, his horse was shot, which caused him to fall to the ground. A piece of shrapnel struck him and despite successful surgery, continued to cause him pain.

Nevertheless, he was at the head of the regiment when it deployed on the left wing in the Battle of Leuthen. In the Battle of Hochkirch, he fought with the Cuirassier Regiment "Jung-Schönaich" No. 6 against the advancing Austrians. He was shot at the beginning of that battle in the shoulder. Despite the injury, he fought until he was forced off his horse. He was later found alive by his soldiers and taken to Bautzen. From there he went to Schweidnitz, where his wound became infected and killed him on 25 February 1759.

== Family ==
His parents were Kaspar von Krockow (1670 – 11 January 1731), heir to Peest, and his wife, Sylvia Juliane von Haunold (d. 1734), widow of the Herr von Briren. His sister Maria Charlotte (d. 1750) was the wife of General Adam Joachim von Podewils. In 1730 Krockow married Sophia Lucretia von Wulffen (1702 – 19 November 1758) of Neudorf in Halberstadt and had the following children:

- Kaspar Wilhelm (1731 – 1773), Prussian officer, general adjutant to his father
- Heinrich Joachim Reinhold (1733 – 1796), colonel, commander of the Husarenregiment "von Zieten“ Nr. 2; married Louise von Göppel (14 February 1749 – 5 February 1803), who married as her second husband the widowed Casimir Egbert Theodor von Brauneck (26 January 1776 – 15 July 1854)

- Heinrich Joachim Reinhold had a son Reinhold, later Reinhold Graf von Krockow. On the recommendation of Immanuel Kant he was educated from 1791 to 1793 by Johann Gottlieb Fichte.

- Johanna Charlotte (d. 1776) married 23 May 1760 Friedrich Siegmund von Grape (31 October 1738 – 1806)
- A son, died young
