= Mszanka =

Mszanka may refer to the following places:

- Mszanka, Lesser Poland Voivodeship (south Poland)
- Mszanka, Lublin Voivodeship (east Poland)
- Mszanka, West Pomeranian Voivodeship (north-west Poland)
