= Luzna =

Luzna may refer to places:

== Czech Republic ==
- Lužná (Rakovník District), a municipality and village in the Central Bohemian Region
- Lužná (Vsetín District), a municipality and village in the Zlín Region
- Lužná, a village and part of Bor (Tachov District) in the Plzeň Region
- Lužná, a village and part of Kopřivná in the Olomouc Region
- Lužná, a village and part of Větřní in the South Bohemian Region

== Latvia ==
- Lūžņa, a village

== Poland ==
- Gmina Łużna, a gmina in Lesser Poland Voivodeship
  - Łużna, a village
