= Złakowo =

- Village
- Location within Poland
- Coordinates: 54°31′26″N 16°43′29″E
- Country: Poland
- Voivodeship: West Pomeranian
- County: Sławno
- Gmina: Postomino
- Population: 193

Złakowo [zwaˈkɔvɔ] (German: Schlackow) is a village in the administrative district of Gmina Postomino, within Sławno County, West Pomeranian Voivodeship, in north-western Poland. It lies approximately 4 km (2 mi) north of Postomino, 18 km (11 mi) north of Sławno, and 187 km (116 mi) north-east of the regional capital Szczecin.

For the history of the region, see History of Pomerania.

The village has a population of 193.
