= Werner Lorenz =

WWII Nazi official (1891–1974)

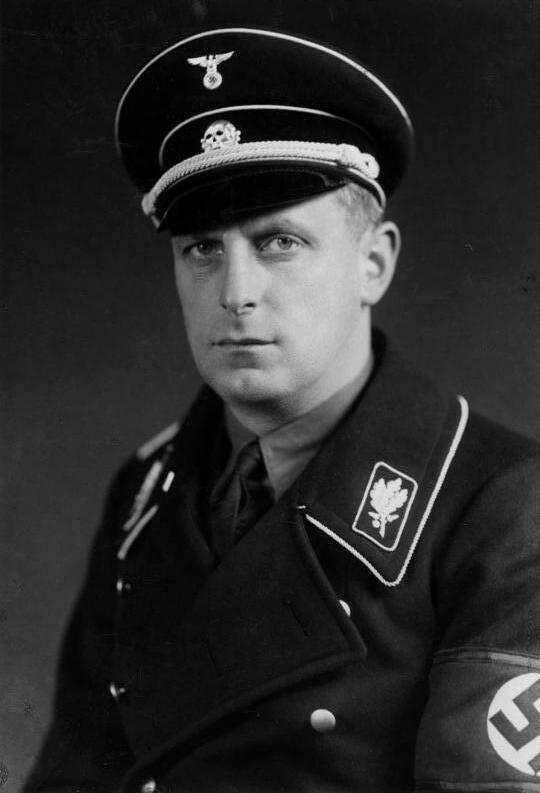
- Lorenz in 1934
- Born: 2 October 1891; Grünhof, German Empire
- Died: 13 March 1974 (aged 82); Hamburg, West Germany
- Children: Rosemarie Springer
- Relatives: Axel Springer (son-in-law)
- Status: Deceased
- Convictions: Crimes against humanity War crimes Membership in a criminal organization
- Trial: RuSHA trial
- Penalty: 20 years imprisonment; commuted to 15 years imprisonment
- Military career
- Allegiance: German Empire; Weimar Republic; Nazi Germany
- Branch: Imperial German Army; Luftstreitkräfte; Schutzstaffel; Waffen-SS
- Service years: 1914–1945
- Rank: SS-Obergruppenführer
- Unit: SS Race and Settlement Main Office
- Commands: VOMI
- Conflicts: World War I
- Awards: 1914 Iron Cross, 1st class

Werner Lorenz (2 October 1891 – 13 March 1974) was an SS functionary during the Nazi era. He was head of the Volksdeutsche Mittelstelle (VOMI) (Main Office for Ethnic Germans), an organization charged with resettling ethnic Germans in the "German Reich" from other parts of Europe, as well as colonising the occupied lands during World War II. After the war, Lorenz was sentenced to prison for crimes against humanity in 1948. He was released in 1954 and died in 1974.

== Early life ==
He was born in Grünhof (now in Gmina Postomino, Sławno County) near Stolp, Pomerania. His father was a forest warden. In 1909 Lorenz went to Military school. He served in World War I first as a cavalry officer then as a pilot in the Luftstreitkräfte. After the war he worked as a border guard and as farmer. He later acquired land and industrial property in Danzig. Through his daughter Rosemarie, Lorenz would become Axel Springer's father-in-law.

== Nazi Party and SS career ==
In 1929 Lorenz joined the Nazi Party and the SS in 1931. Two years later he had an active political role as a member of the Landtag in the Free State of Prussia and worked at the Hamburg State Council. At the November 1933 parliamentary election, he was elected as a Reichstag deputy from electoral constituency 1 (East Prussia). He would remain in the Reichstag until the fall of the Nazi regime, switching to constituency 34 (Hamburg) at the March 1936 election.

In November 1933 Lorenz was promoted to SS-Gruppenführer and led the SS Upper Division North in Altona from 1934 until 1937. He was promoted to SS-Obergruppenführer in 1936. In January 1937, was promoted to head the Nazi Party agency Volksdeutsche Mittelstelle (VOMI) that was initially responsible for the welfare of ethnic Germans (Volksdeutsche) living beyond the pre-war borders of Nazi Germany. After the Second World War began, the VOMI took charge of the resettlement of ethnic Germans on captured territory, but also the "Germanization" of foreign children such as Poles and Slovenes. Some accounts consider him the "least radical" of the higher SS leadership.

== Ethnic cleansing in World War II ==
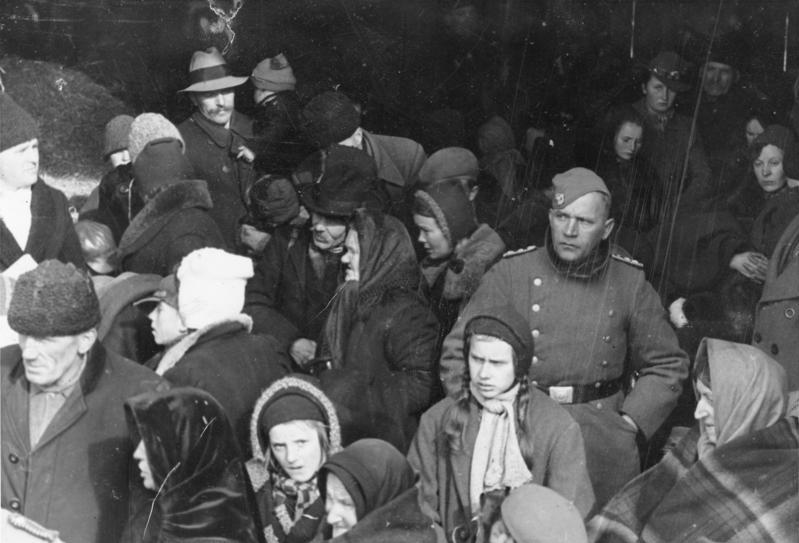
Poles being forced out of their homes and lands to make room for Volksdeutsche in 1939.

Following the invasion of Poland in 1939, Lorenz was the chief executive responsible for allocating confiscated land, property and managing the affairs of the Volksdeutsch in all other areas of occupied Eastern Europe. VOMI, which was an office of the Nazi Party, would take control of a district once the native populations had been driven from their homes and lands. Ethnic German settlers were then given the land to work under the direction of VOMI officials. In respect to his international work, Lorenz was plenipotentiary for foreign relations for Adolf Hitler's deputy, Rudolf Hess.

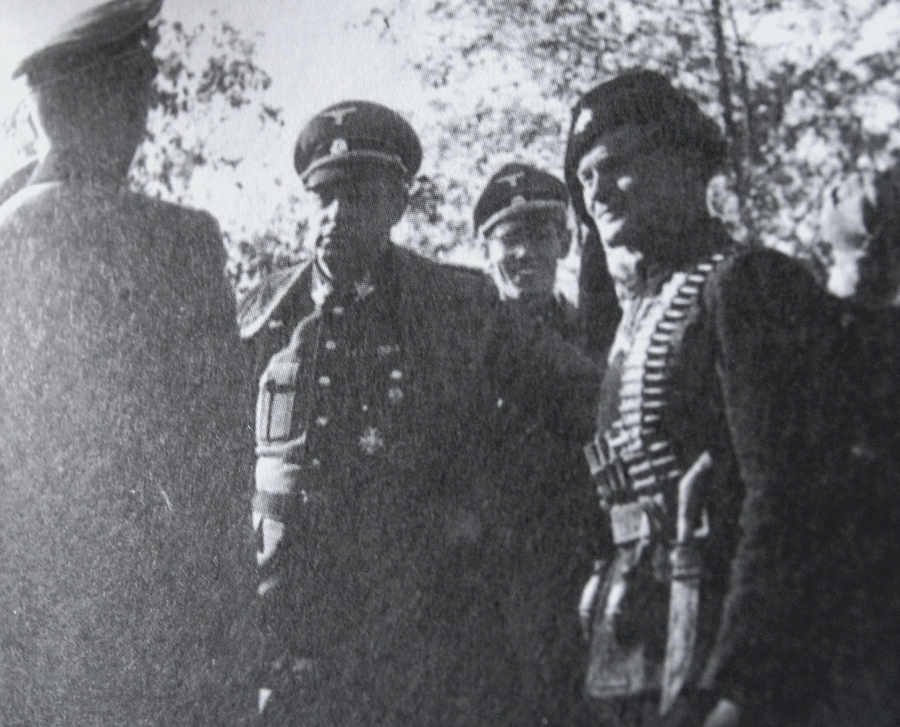
Lorenz with a Chetnik officer in Bosnia, autumn 1942.

In June 1941 VOMI was absorbed into the office of the Reich Commissioner for the Consolidation of German Nationhood (RKFDV) run by Reichsführer-SS Heinrich Himmler. The RKFDV, as an SS-controlled organization, had the authority to say who was German, where ethnic Germans could live, and what populations should be cleared or annihilated in order to make room for the German settlers from the east Europe during action "Heim ins Reich". As RKFDV chief, Himmler authorized the Einsatzgruppen (SS death squads) and other SS police units to round up and kill Jews, Slavs and Roma. Lorenz remained in charge of Volksdeutsch settlements in these ethnically cleansed areas. He also was responsible for VOMI officials who handled the personal property seized from Jews killed during Operation Reinhard in the General Government during 1942-1943.

In late 1942 Lorenz was seriously injured in a vehicle accident in Bosnia while overseeing the VOMI evacuation of ethnic Germans from the region.

== Post-war ==
At the end of World War II, Lorenz was arrested and held in an internment camp in England. He was sentenced to 20 years in prison at the RuSHA Trial at Nuremberg on 10 March 1948. Later, his sentence was reduced and Lorenz was released from prison in 1954. He died in Hamburg in 1974.

== Service record ==
Dates of rank

- SS-Sturmbannführer: 31 March 1931
- SS-Standartenführer: 7 July 1931
- SS-Oberführer: 9 November 1931
- SS-Brigadeführer: 1 July 1933
- SS-Gruppenführer: 1 November 1933
- SS-Obergruppenführer: 9 November 1936
- SS-Obergruppenführer und General der Polizei: 15 August 1942
- SS-Obergruppenführer und General der Waffen-SS: 9 November 1944

== Bibliography ==
- Koehl, Robert Lewis (1957). RKFDV: German Resettlement and Population Policy, 1939-1945: A History of the Reich Commission for the Strengthening of Germandom. Harvard University Press.
- Paikert, G. C. (1967). The Danube Swabians: German Populations in Hungary, Rumania and Yugoslavia and Hitler's Impact on their Patterns. Martinus Nijhoff.
- Spring, Thomas E. (1999). The Nazi Resettlement Bureaucracy and the Baltic states of Estonia and Latvia. University of Wisconsin-Madison.
- Reitlinger, Gerald (1960). The House Built on Sand: The Conflicts of German Policy in Russia, 1939-1945. Viking Press.
- Zentner, Christian; Bedürftig, Friedemann (1997) [1991]. The Encyclopedia of the Third Reich. New York: Da Capo Press. ISBN 978-0-3068079-3-0.
