= Radziszkowo =

- Settlement
- Location within Poland
- Coordinates: 54°30′42″N 16°30′0″E
- Country: Poland
- Voivodeship: West Pomeranian
- County: Sławno
- Gmina: Postomino

Radziszkowo [rad͡ʑiʂˈkɔvɔ] is a settlement in the administrative district of Gmina Postomino, within Sławno County, West Pomeranian Voivodeship, in north-western Poland. It lies approximately 15 km (9 mi) west of Postomino, 20 km (12 mi) north-west of Sławno, and 175 km (109 mi) north-east of the regional capital Szczecin.

For the history of the region, see History of Pomerania.
