= Wszedzień, West Pomeranian Voivodeship =

Wszedzień
- Village
- Location within Poland
- Coordinates: 54°29′22″N 16°35′0″E
- Country: Poland
- Voivodeship: West Pomeranian
- County: Sławno
- Gmina: Postomino

Wszedzień [ˈfʂɛd͡ʑɛɲ] (formerly German Scheddin) is a village in the administrative district of Gmina Postomino, within Sławno County, West Pomeranian Voivodeship, in north-western Poland. It lies approximately 9 km (6 mi) west of Postomino, 16 km (10 mi) north-west of Sławno, and 178 km (111 mi) north-east of the regional capital Szczecin.

For the history of the region, see History of Pomerania.
