= Masłowice, West Pomeranian Voivodeship =

Masłowice
- Village
- Location within Poland
- Coordinates: 54°28′24″N 16°36′49″E
- Country: Poland
- Voivodeship: West Pomeranian
- County: Sławno
- Gmina: Postomino
- Population: 165

Masłowice ([maswɔˈvit͡sɛ]; German: Masselwitz); is a village in the administrative district of Gmina Postomino, within Sławno County, West Pomeranian Voivodeship, in north-western Poland. It lies approximately 8 km (5 mi) west of Postomino, 13 km (8 mi) north of Sławno, and 178 km (111 mi) north-east of the regional capital Szczecin.

The village has a population of 165. Which will soon drop to around 90 after some villagers were offered jobs in late May 2013 away from the village.
