= Wilkowice, West Pomeranian Voivodeship =

Wilkowice
- Village
- Location within Poland
- Coordinates: 54°26′48″N 16°42′18″E
- Country: Poland
- Voivodeship: West Pomeranian
- County: Sławno
- Gmina: Postomino
- Population: 211

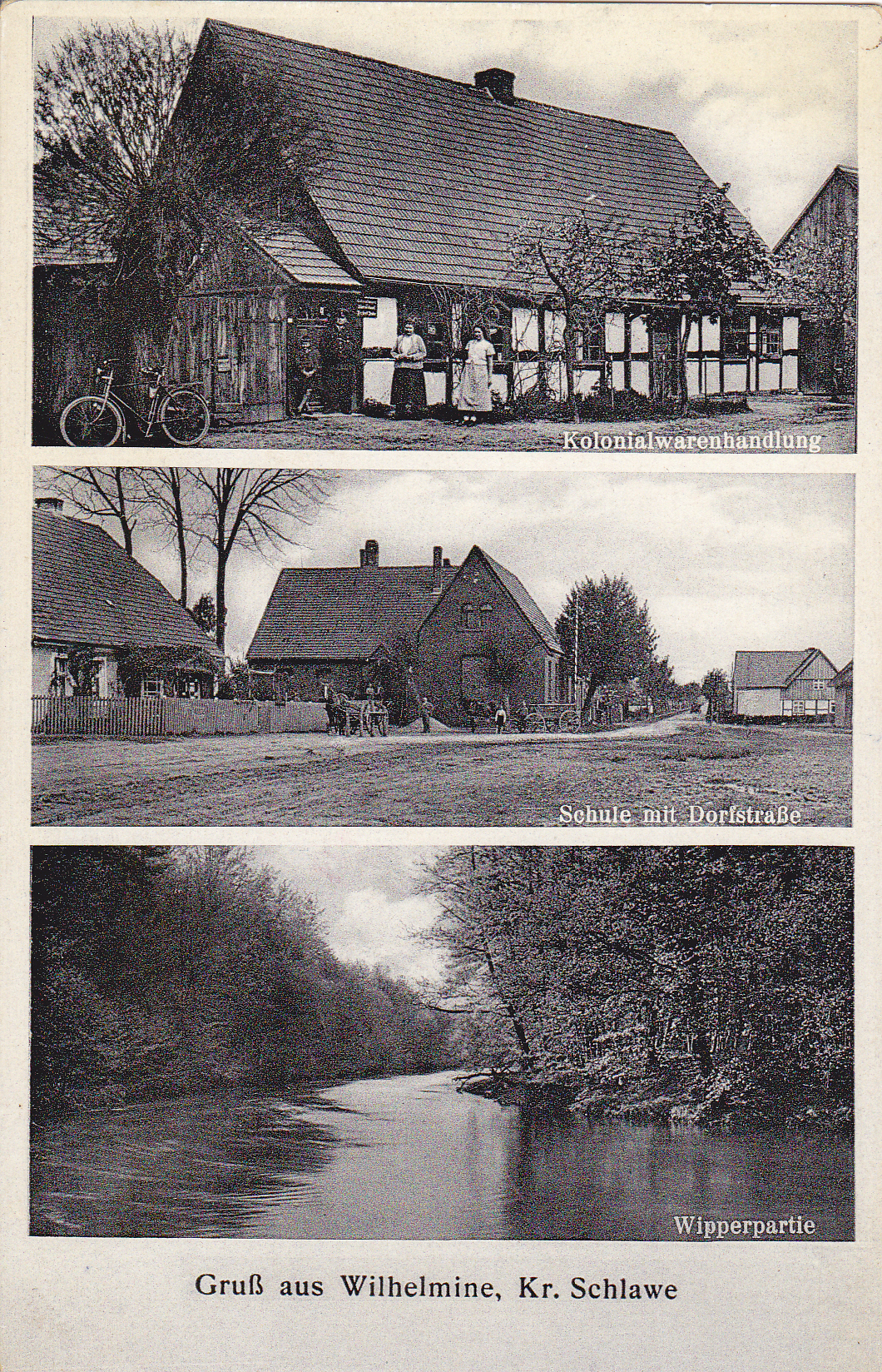
Wilkowice (German: Wilhelmine).Postcard from the early 20th century.Postcard shows: grocery store;school and village road; river Wieprza. Publisher: Willy Schröder, Photograph, Stolp i Pom.

Wilkowice [vilkɔˈvit͡sɛ] (German: Wilhelmine) is a village in the administrative district of Gmina Postomino, within Sławno County, West Pomeranian Voivodeship, in north-western Poland. It lies approximately 6 km (4 mi) south of Postomino, 9 km (6 mi) north of Sławno, and 180 km (112 mi) north-east of the regional capital Szczecin.

For the history of the region, see History of Pomerania.

The village has a population of 211.
