= Tyn =

Tyn may refer to:

== Places ==
- Tyń, Poland
- Týn nad Bečvou, Moravia, Czech Republic
- Týn nad Vltavou, Czech Bohemia
- Tyn-y-Gongl, Anglesey, Wales
- Horšovský Týn, Czech Republic

== Other uses ==
- Church of Our Lady before Týn, a church in Prague
- 14537 Týn nad Vltavou, a comet

== See also ==
- TYN (disambiguation)
- Town, with the same etymology as Czech týn
