= Marszewo, Sławno County =

Marszewo
- Village
- Location within Poland
- Coordinates: 54°30′39″N 16°42′4″E
- Country: Poland
- Voivodeship: West Pomeranian
- County: Sławno
- Gmina: Postomino
- Population: 216

Marszewo (Polish pronunciation: [marˈʂɛvɔ]; German: Marsow) is a village in the administrative district of Gmina Postomino, within Sławno County, West Pomeranian Voivodeship, in north-western Poland. It lies approximately 2 km (1 mi) north-west of Postomino, 17 km (11 mi) north of Sławno, and 185 km (115 mi) north-east of the regional capital Szczecin.

For the history of the region, see History of Pomerania.

The village has a population of 216.

== History ==
The first mention of Marszewo comes from documents of the Darłowo Carthusians from 1436. After the Reformation, the village became a noble farm. The currently preserved rural architecture of Marszewo is typologically and chronologically diverse, with clear references to the historical structure of the oval plan with partial half-timbered buildings with a truss motif.

== Monuments ==
Monuments entered into the register of monuments of the Provincial Conservator of Monuments:

- the 15th-century Gothic tower of the church of Our Lady of the Rosary.

The entire church from 1863, along with several residential and livestock buildings, is under conservation care. The oldest part of the church is the massive, square tower built in the mid-15th century. In 1863, a new brick nave in the neo-Gothic style was built on the eastern side of the tower. The church was once surrounded by a cemetery. The church in Marszewo, dedicated to Our Lady of the Rosary, is a branch church of the parish in Postomino. The church contains an early 17th-century Renaissance pulpit with figures of the Evangelists and an 18th-century Baroque altar.

== Spatial structure of the town ==
Marszewo is an example of a village with a circular square-shaped settlement, echoing the irregular pre-incorporation settlements and a regular field-and-field layout, with one large field adjacent to the settlement. The circular settlements and villages, which are classified as square villages, have a closed form with a main road leading to the settlement. The farmsteads are situated around a small square. In the 15th century, thanks to the village's location under German law, the old settlement was measured out and regulated. A field-and-field layout and regular development were introduced. The spatial layout of Marszewo remains clearly visible to this day.

A tourist attraction in Marszewo is the picturesque, post-glacial Lake Maszewo, with a maximum depth of 24 meters, featuring clear water, a sandy beach, and a jetty. The lake's catchment area and reservoir demonstrate high natural potential. This area serves as a source of water for the Marszewka River and a bird sanctuary. Patches of natural vegetation have also been preserved in the immediate vicinity of the lake. The lake is popular with swimming and fishing enthusiasts, among others. The Polish Remote-Controlled Model Sailing Championships are held annually.
