= Królewice, West Pomeranian Voivodeship =

Królewice
- Village
- Location within Poland
- Coordinates: 54°32′53″N 16°39′26″E
- Country: Poland
- Voivodeship: West Pomeranian
- County: Sławno
- Gmina: Postomino
- Population: 0

Królewice (Polish pronunciation: [krulɛˈvit͡sɛ]; German: Krolowstrand) is a former village in the administrative district of Gmina Postomino, within Sławno County, West Pomeranian Voivodeship, in north-western Poland. It lies approximately 7 km (4 mi) north-west of Postomino, 21 km (13 mi) north of Sławno, and 185 km (115 mi) north-east of the regional capital Szczecin.

For the history of the region, see History of Pomerania.
