= Staniewice =

- Village
- Location within Poland
- Coordinates: 54°26′5″N 16°44′5″E
- Country: Poland
- Voivodeship: West Pomeranian
- County: Sławno
- Gmina: Postomino
- Population: 446

Staniewice [staɲɛˈvit͡sɛ] (German: Stemnitz) is a village in the administrative district of Gmina Postomino, within Sławno County, West Pomeranian Voivodeship, in north-western Poland. It lies approximately 7 km (4 mi) south of Postomino, 9 km (6 mi) north-east of Sławno, and 181 km (112 mi) north-east of the regional capital Szczecin.

For the history of the region, see History of Pomerania.
