= Karsino =

- Village
- Location within Poland
- Coordinates: 54°28′15″N 16°33′44″E
- Country: Poland
- Voivodeship: West Pomeranian
- County: Sławno
- Gmina: Postomino
- Population: 103

Karsino (Polish pronunciation: [karˈɕinɔ]; formerly German: Karzin) is a village in the administrative district of Gmina Postomino, within Sławno County, West Pomeranian Voivodeship, in north-western Poland. It lies approximately 11 km (7 mi) west of Postomino, 14 km (9 mi) north-west of Sławno, and 175 km (109 mi) north-east of the regional capital Szczecin.

The village has a population of 103.
