= Mszane =

- Settlement
- Location within Poland
- Coordinates: 54°28′11″N 16°42′41″E
- Country: Poland
- Voivodeship: West Pomeranian
- County: Sławno
- Gmina: Postomino

Mszane (Polish pronunciation: [ˈmʂanɛ]; formerly German: Groß Waldhof) is a settlement in the administrative district of Gmina Postomino, within Sławno County, West Pomeranian Voivodeship, in north-western Poland. It lies approximately 3 km (2 mi) south of Postomino, 12 km (7 mi) north of Sławno, and 182 km (113 mi) north-east of the regional capital Szczecin.

For the history of the region, see History of Pomerania.
