= Wicko Morskie =

- Village
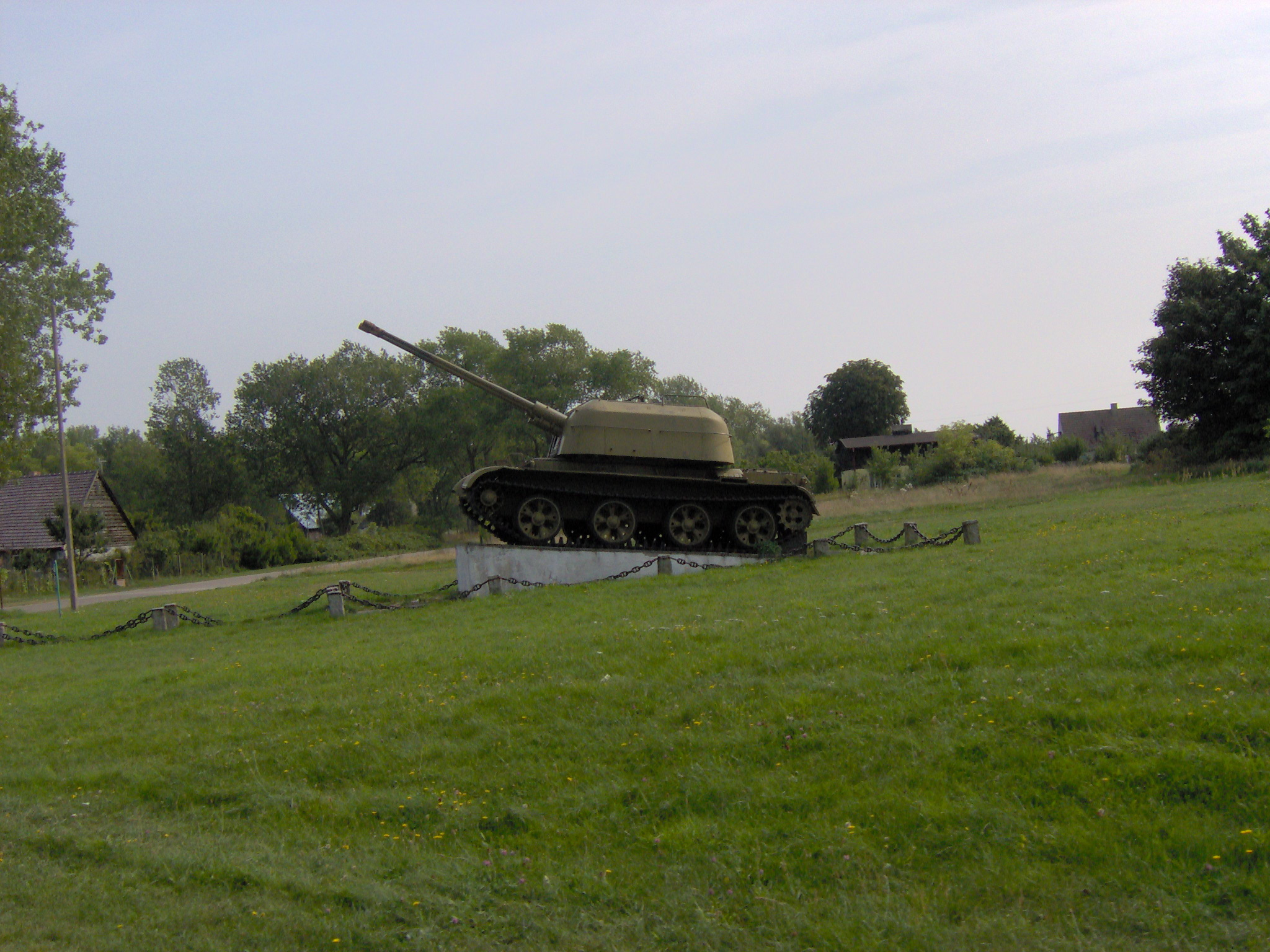

- Location within Poland
- Coordinates: 54°32′56″N 16°36′12″E
- Country: Poland
- Voivodeship: West Pomeranian
- County: Sławno
- Gmina: Postomino
- Population: 55
- Time zone: UTC+1 (CET)
  - Summer (DST): UTC+2 (CEST)
- Vehicle registration: ZSL

Wicko Morskie [ˈvit͡skɔ ˈmɔrskʲɛ] (German: Vietzkerstrand) is a village in the administrative district of Gmina Postomino, within Sławno County, West Pomeranian Voivodeship, in north-western Poland. It lies approximately 10 km (6 mi) north-west of Postomino, 21 km (13 mi) north of Sławno, and 183 km (114 mi) north-east of the regional capital Szczecin. It is located on the Slovincian Coast between the Baltic Sea in the north and Lake Wicko in the south.

The village has a population of 55.

A proving ground of the Polish Air Force is located in Wicko Morskie.
