= Naćmierz, Sławno County =

Naćmierz
- Village
- Location within Poland
- Coordinates: 54°30′34″N 16°33′27″E
- Country: Poland
- Voivodeship: West Pomeranian
- County: Sławno
- Gmina: Postomino
- Population: 363

Naćmierz (Polish pronunciation: [ˈnat͡ɕmjɛʂ]; German: Natzmershagen) is a village in the administrative district of Gmina Postomino, within Sławno County, West Pomeranian Voivodeship, in north-western Poland. It lies approximately 11 km (7 mi) west of Postomino, 18 km (11 mi) north-west of Sławno, and 178 km (111 mi) north-east of the regional capital Szczecin.

For the history of the region, see History of Pomerania.

The village has a population of 363.
