= Bieśnik =

Bieśnik refers to the following places in Poland:

- Bieśnik, Gorlice County
- Bieśnik, Tarnów County
