= Przybudówka-Królewo =

- Settlement
- Location within Poland
- Coordinates: 54°30′21″N 16°38′45″E
- Country: Poland
- Voivodeship: West Pomeranian
- County: Sławno
- Gmina: Postomino

Przybudówka-Królewo [pʂɨbuˈdufka kruˈlɛvɔ] is a settlement in the administrative district of Gmina Postomino, within Sławno County, West Pomeranian Voivodeship, in north-western Poland. It lies approximately 5 km (3 mi) west of Postomino, 16 km (10 mi) north of Sławno, and 182 km (113 mi) north-east of the regional capital Szczecin.

For the history of the region, see History of Pomerania.
