= Wicko (lake) =

Wicko Lake
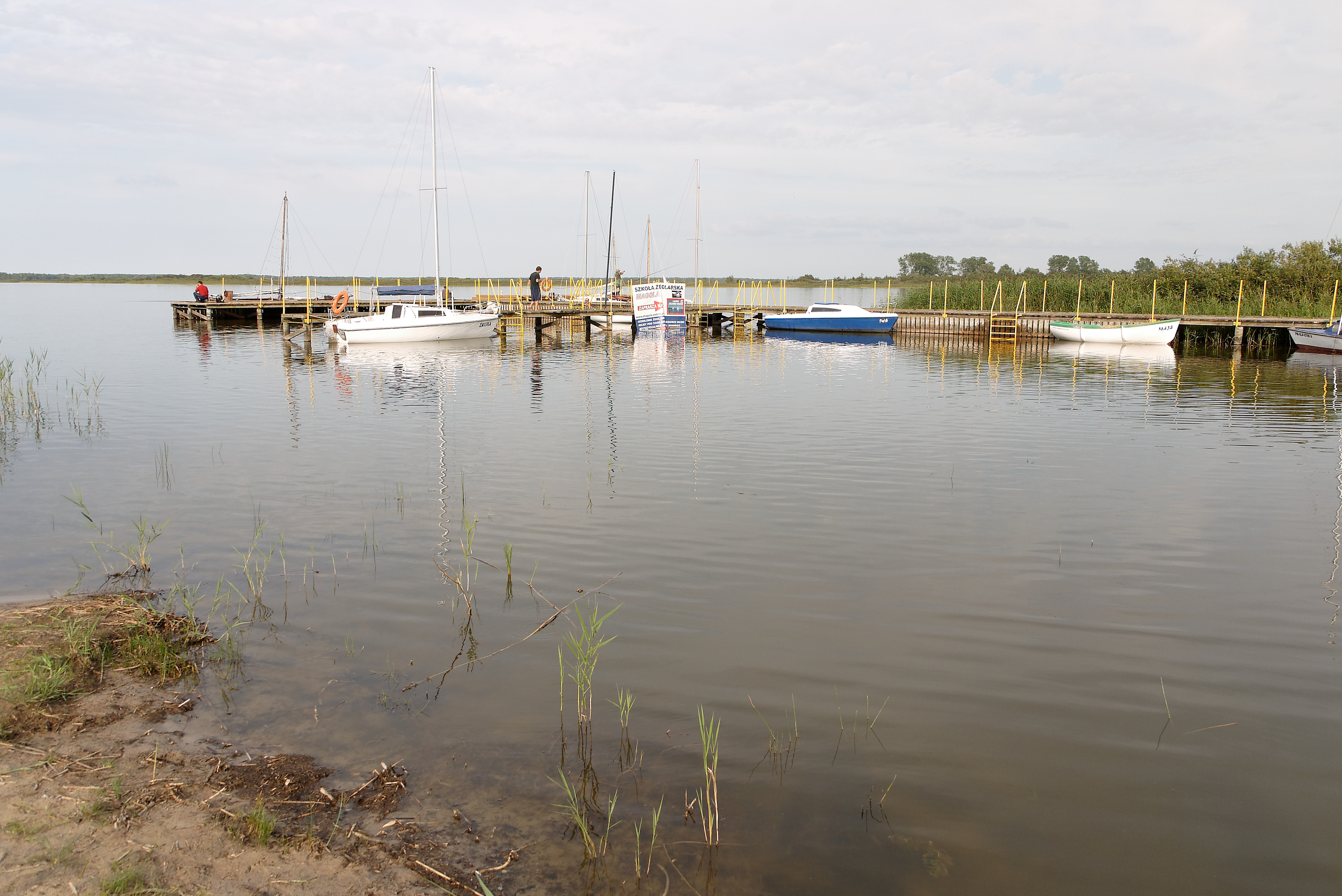
- Wicko Lake

- Location within West Pomeranian Voivodeship
- Coordinates: 54°32′22″N 16°37′08″E
- Type: reservoir
- Primary inflows: Klasztorna, Świdnik
- Primary outflows: Głównica
- Basin countries: Poland
- Max. length: 5.1 km (3.2 mi)
- Max. width: 3.7 km (2.3 mi)
- Surface area: 18.9 km^{2} (7.3 sq mi)
- Average depth: 15.2 m (50 ft)
- Max. depth: 6 m (20 ft)
- Water volume: 220,800,000 m^{3} (179,000 acre⋅ft)
- Surface elevation: 0.1 m (0.33 ft)
- Settlements: Wicko Morskie

Wicko is a by-coastal lake on the Slovincian Coast, located in Gmina Postomino, in Sławno County, in the West Pomeranian Voivodeship in Poland. The lake was formed due to a spit closing the body of the water off from the Baltic Sea. The lake is located near the Wicko Morskie Airport in Wicko Morskie.
