= Górka, West Pomeranian Voivodeship =

Górka
- Settlement
- Location within Poland
- Coordinates: 54°30′24″N 16°41′14″E
- Country: Poland
- Voivodeship: West Pomeranian
- County: Sławno
- Gmina: Postomino

Górka [ˈɡurka] is a settlement in the administrative district of Gmina Postomino, within Sławno County, West Pomeranian Voivodeship, in north-western Poland. It lies approximately 3 km (2 mi) north-west of Postomino, 16 km (10 mi) north of Sławno, and 184 km (114 mi) north-east of the regional capital Szczecin.

For the history of the region, see History of Pomerania.
