= Pieńkowo =

- Village
- Location within Poland
- Coordinates: 54°29′9″N 16°41′46″E
- Country: Poland
- Voivodeship: West Pomeranian
- County: Sławno
- Gmina: Postomino
- Population: 700

Pieńkowo [pjɛɲˈkɔvɔ] (formerly German Pennekow) is a village in the administrative district of Gmina Postomino, within Sławno County, West Pomeranian Voivodeship, in north-western Poland. It lies approximately 2 km (1 mi) south-west of Postomino, 14 km (9 mi) north of Sławno, and 183 km (114 mi) north-east of the regional capital Szczecin.

For the history of the region, see History of Pomerania.

The village has a population of 700.
