= Nosalin =

- Village
- Location within Poland
- Coordinates: 54°25′54″N 16°46′10″E
- Country: Poland
- Voivodeship: West Pomeranian
- County: Sławno
- Gmina: Postomino
- Population: 158

Nosalin (Polish pronunciation: [nɔˈsalin]; German: Nitzlin) is a village in the administrative district of Gmina Postomino, within Sławno County, West Pomeranian Voivodeship, in north-western Poland. It lies approximately 8 km (5 mi) south-east of Postomino, 10 km (6 mi) north-east of Sławno, and 183 km (114 mi) north-east of the regional capital Szczecin. In 2021, Nosalin had 158 inhabitants.

== History ==
Not much is known about the history of the village from documented sources. It is assumed that the village has always been a pure farming village without a manor house. The village had been a fief of the von Below family since 1466. Around 1780 it was one of the largest villages in the area, with 17 farmers, a smithy, a schoolmaster and 34 fireplaces. In the meantime, one of three parts of the village had fallen into the possession of the von Krockow family (from 1635 to 1637). In 1804 it was again entirely in the possession of the von Below family. In 1835, the von Below family sold it to the Prussian state, probably in connection with the Prussian Reform Movement. Since then it has been an independent farming village. On 8 March 1945, the village was occupied by Soviet troops. The farms were taken over by Poles. In April 1947, all Germans were expelled.

The layout and spatial, oval-shaped structure of the village changed little after 1945. A few buildings remained in their original form. Most of them, however, were rebuilt.

From 1975 to 1998 the village was administratively assigned to the Słupsk Voivodeship.

For the general history of the region, see History of Pomerania.

== Religion ==
The population was entirely Protestant before 1945 and belonged to the parish in Pieszcz (Peest).

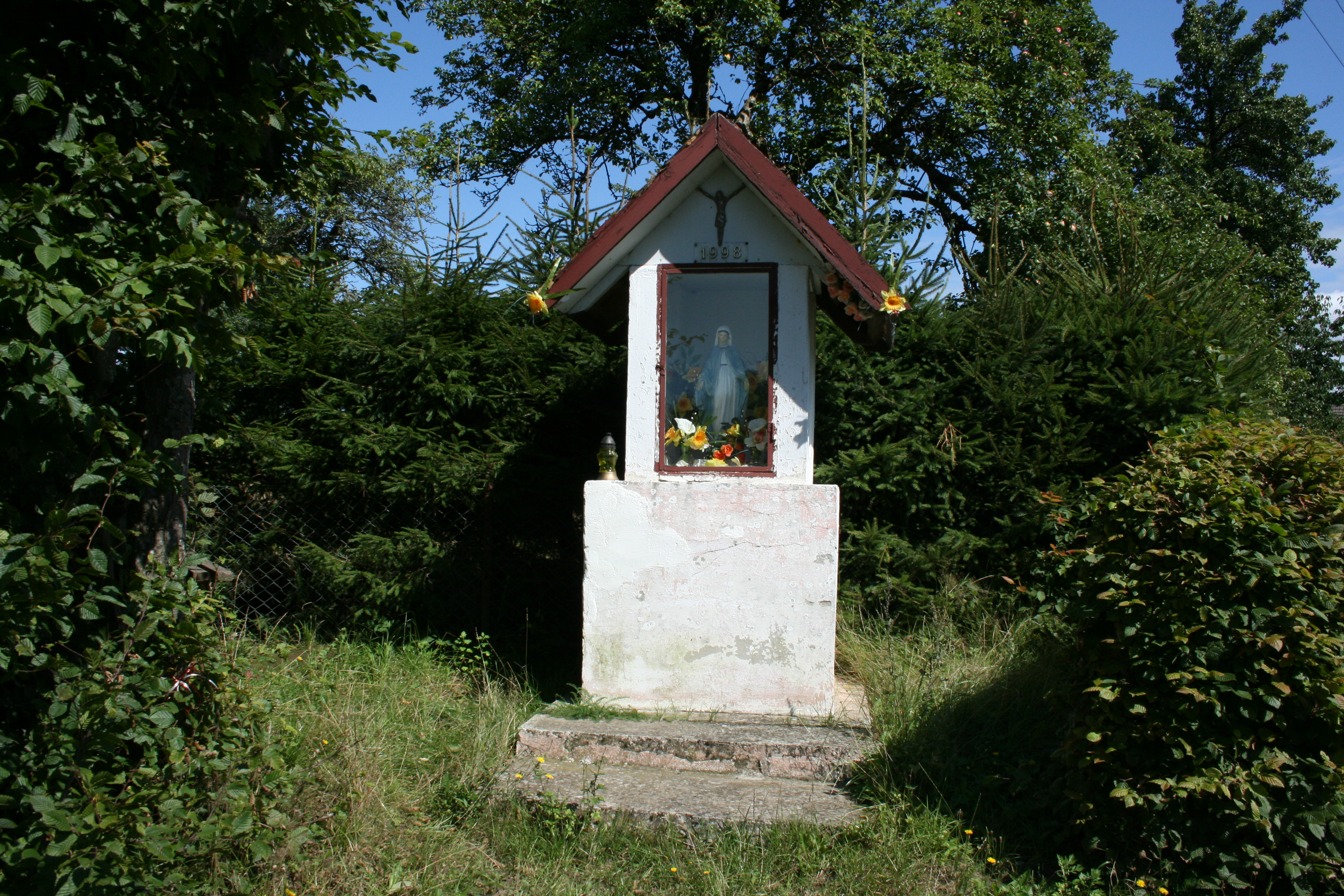
Wayside shrine

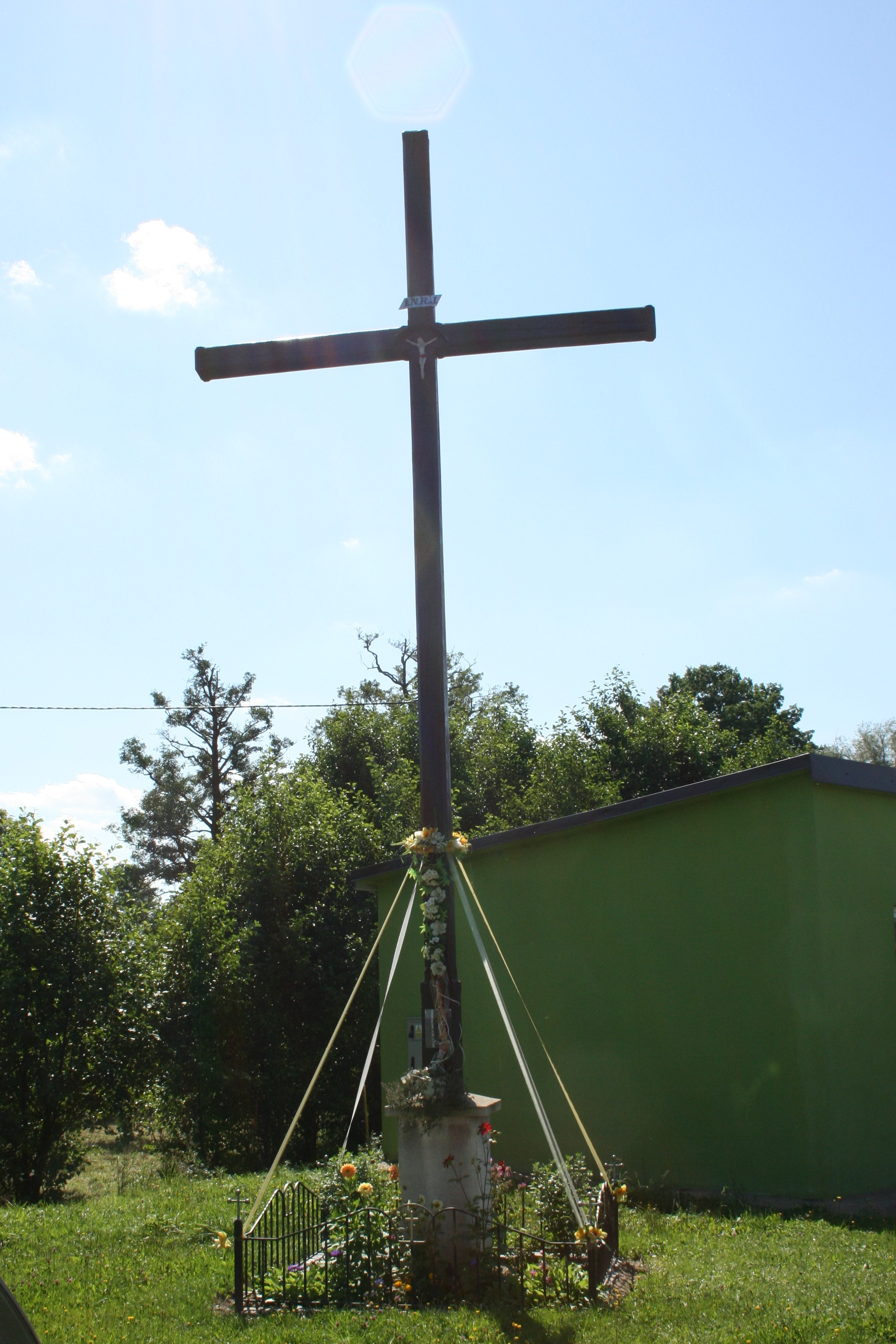
Wayside cross

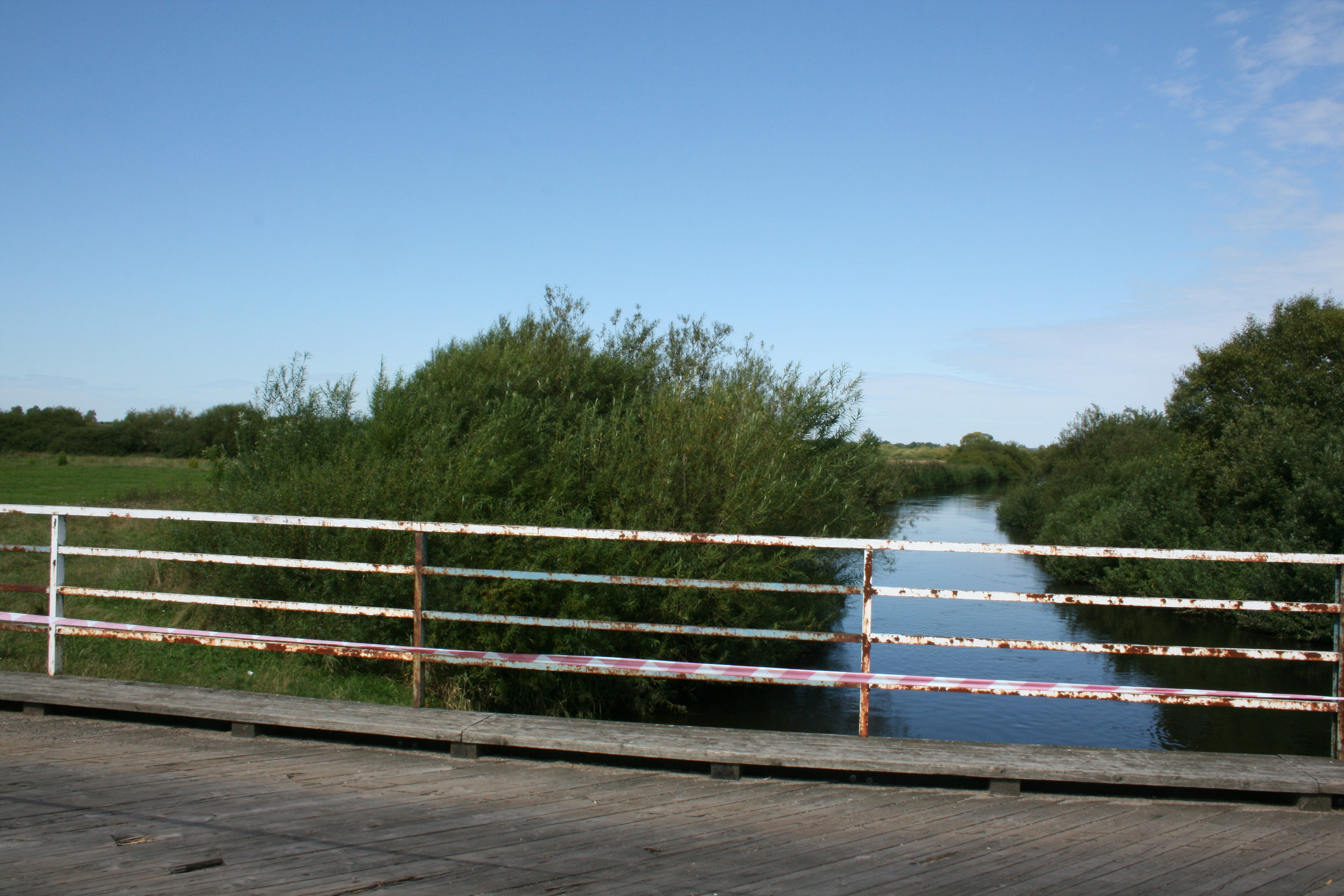
Bridge over the Wieprza River

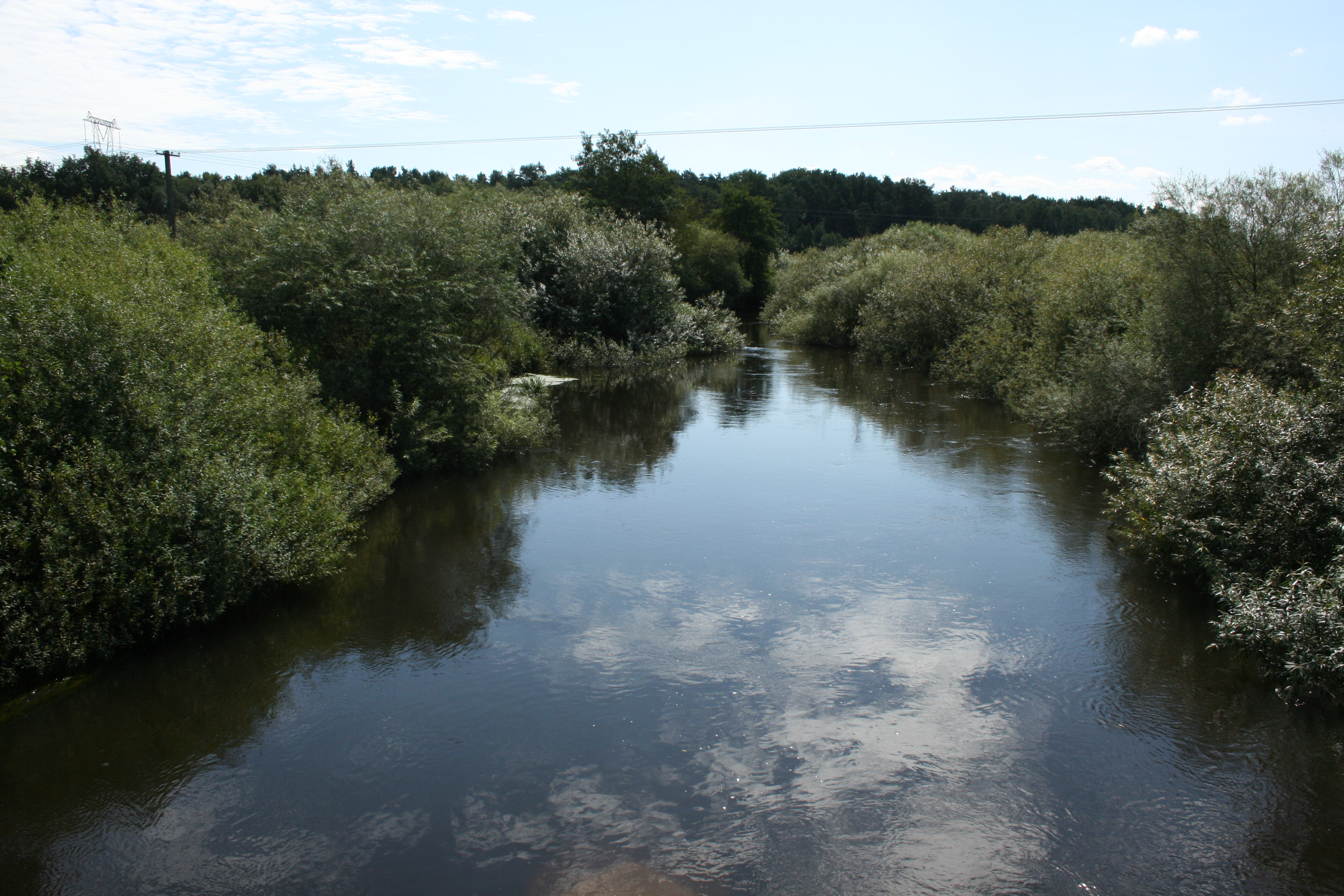
Wieprza River

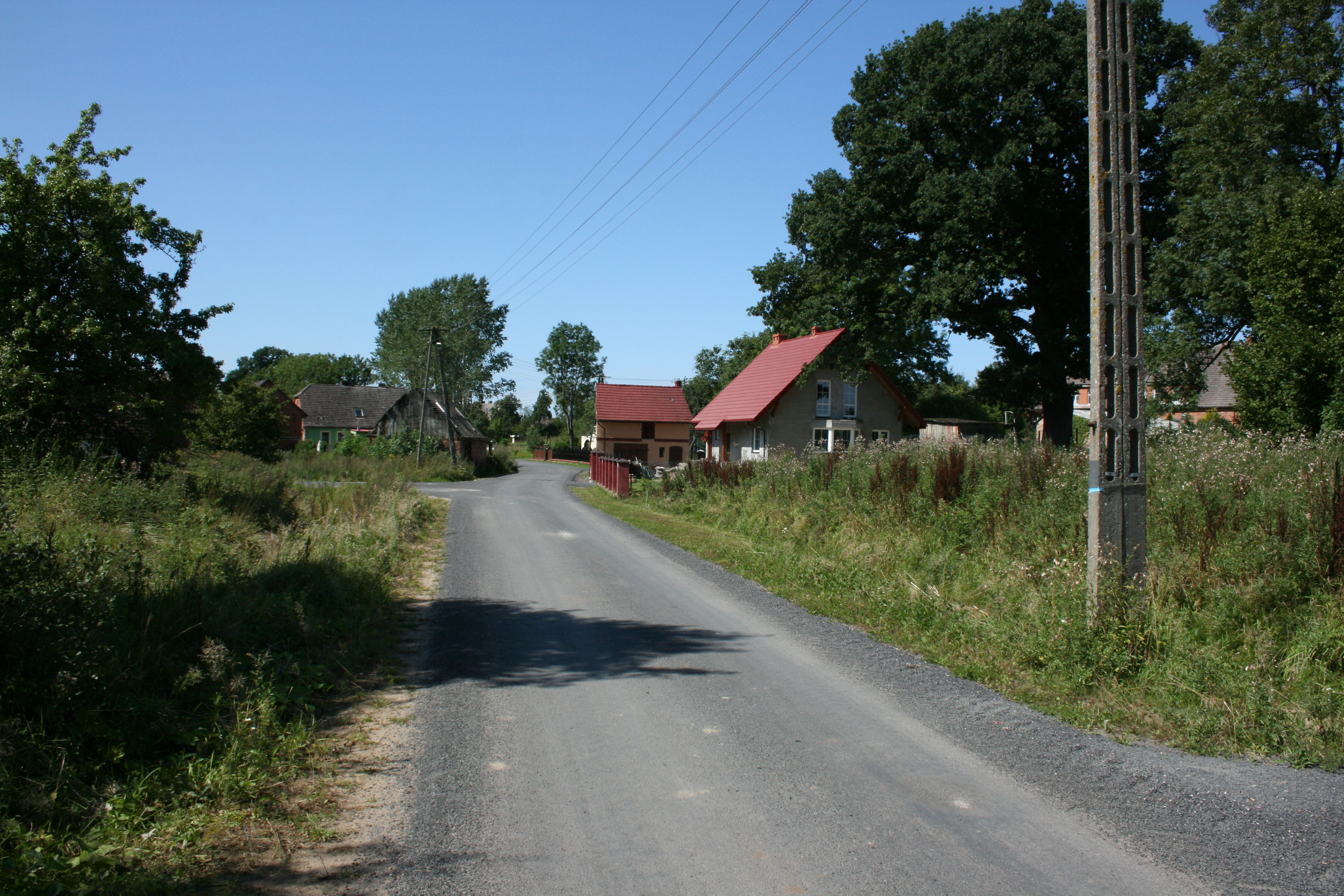
View to the village centre of Nosalin

== School ==
Before 1945, the village school consisted of two classes taught in a separate school building with two teachers' flats. The school building was constructed around 1930.
