= Rusinowo, Sławno County =

Rusinowo
- Village
- Location within Poland
- Coordinates: 54°30′45″N 16°30′58″E
- Country: Poland
- Voivodeship: West Pomeranian
- County: Sławno
- Gmina: Postomino
- Population: 282

Rusinowo [ruɕiˈnɔvɔ] (formerly German: Rützenhagen) is a village in the administrative district of Gmina Postomino, within Sławno County, West Pomeranian Voivodeship, in north-western Poland. It lies approximately 13 km (8 mi) west of Postomino, 20 km (12 mi) north-west of Sławno, and 176 km (109 mi) north-east of the regional capital Szczecin.

The village has a population of 282.

For the history of the region, see History of Pomerania.
