= Jezierzany, West Pomeranian Voivodeship =

Jezierzany
- Village
- Location within Poland
- Coordinates: 54°32′4″N 16°34′53″E
- Country: Poland
- Voivodeship: West Pomeranian
- County: Sławno
- Gmina: Postomino

Jezierzany (Polish pronunciation: [jɛʑɛˈʐanɨ]; German: Neuenhagen, Amt) is a village in the administrative district of Gmina Postomino, within Sławno County, West Pomeranian Voivodeship, in northwestern Poland. It is located approximately 10 km (6 mi) north-west of Postomino, 20 km (12 mi) north of Sławno, and 181 km (112 mi) northeast of the regional capital Szczecin.

For the history of the region, see History of Pomerania.
