= Bylica, West Pomeranian Voivodeship =

Bylica
- Village
- Location within Poland
- Coordinates: 54°29′55″N 16°32′46″E
- Country: Poland
- Voivodeship: West Pomeranian
- County: Sławno
- Gmina: Postomino

Bylica (Polish pronunciation: [bɨˈlit͡sa]; German: Schönenberg) is a village in the administrative district of Gmina Postomino, within Sławno County, West Pomeranian Voivodeship, in north-western Poland. It lies approximately 11 km (7 mi) west of Postomino, 18 km (11 mi) north-west of Sławno, and 176 km (109 mi) north-east of the regional capital Szczecin.

For the history of the region, see History of Pomerania.
