= Łężek, Sławno County =

Łężek
- Settlement
- Location within Poland
- Coordinates: 54°29′49″N 16°36′14″E
- Country: Poland
- Voivodeship: West Pomeranian
- County: Sławno
- Gmina: Postomino

Łężek (Polish pronunciation: [ˈwɛ̃ʐɛk]; formerly German: Lanziger Ländchen) is a settlement in the administrative district of Gmina Postomino, within Sławno County, West Pomeranian Voivodeship, in north-western Poland. It lies approximately 8 km (5 mi) west of Postomino, 16 km (10 mi) north of Sławno, and 179 km (111 mi) north-east of the regional capital Szczecin.

For the history of the region, see History of Pomerania.
