= Łącko, West Pomeranian Voivodeship =

Łącko
- Village
- Location within Poland
- Coordinates: 54°31′13″N 16°36′32″E
- Country: Poland
- Voivodeship: West Pomeranian
- County: Sławno
- Gmina: Postomino
- Population: 231

Łącko (Polish pronunciation: [ˈwɔnt͡skɔ]; formerly German: Lanzig) is a village in the administrative district of Gmina Postomino, within Sławno County, West Pomeranian Voivodeship, in north-western Poland. It lies approximately 8 km (5 mi) west of Postomino, 18 km (11 mi) north of Sławno, and 181 km (112 mi) north-east of the regional capital Szczecin.

For the history of the region, see History of Pomerania.

The village has a population of 243 (2011).
