= Dzierżęcin =

- Village
- Location within Poland
- Coordinates: 54°28′30″N 16°32′36″E
- Country: Poland
- Voivodeship: West Pomeranian
- County: Sławno
- Gmina: Postomino
- Population: 70

Dzierżęcin ( [d͡ʑɛrˈʐɛnt͡ɕin]; German: Dörsenthin) is a village in the administrative district of Gmina Postomino, within Sławno County, West Pomeranian Voivodeship, in north-western Poland. It lies approximately 12 km (7 mi) west of Postomino, 16 km (10 mi) north-west of Sławno, and 175 km (109 mi) north-east of the regional capital Szczecin.

For the history of the region, see History of Pomerania.

The village has a population of 70.
