= Pieńkówko =

- Village
- Location within Poland
- Coordinates: 54°27′43″N 16°42′34″E
- Country: Poland
- Voivodeship: West Pomeranian
- County: Sławno
- Gmina: Postomino

Pieńkówko [pjɛɲˈkufkɔ] is a village in the administrative district of Gmina Postomino, within Sławno County, West Pomeranian Voivodeship, in north-western Poland. It lies approximately 4 km (2 mi) south of Postomino, 11 km (7 mi) north of Sławno, and 182 km (113 mi) north-east of the regional capital Szczecin.

For the history of the region, see History of Pomerania.
