= Nowe Łącko =

- Village
- Location within Poland
- Coordinates: 54°30′33″N 16°34′36″E
- Country: Poland
- Voivodeship: West Pomeranian
- County: Sławno
- Gmina: Postomino

Nowe Łącko [ˈnɔvɛ ˈwɔnt͡skɔ] is a village in the administrative district of Gmina Postomino, within Sławno County, West Pomeranian Voivodeship, in north-western Poland. It lies approximately 10 km (6 mi) west of Postomino, 18 km (11 mi) north-west of Sławno, and 179 km (111 mi) north-east of the regional capital Szczecin.

For the history of the region, see History of Pomerania.
