= Chełmno Słowieńskie =

- Settlement
- Location within Poland
- Coordinates: 54°28′34″N 16°35′33″E
- Country: Poland
- Voivodeship: West Pomeranian
- County: Sławno
- Gmina: Postomino

Chełmno Słowieńskie (Polish pronunciation: [ˈxɛu̯mnɔ swɔˈvjɛɲskʲɛ]; formerly German: Gollenberg) is a settlement in the administrative district of Gmina Postomino, within Sławno County, West Pomeranian Voivodeship, in north-western Poland. It lies approximately 9 km (6 mi) west of Postomino, 14 km (9 mi) north-west of Sławno, and 177 km (110 mi) north-east of the regional capital Szczecin.

For the history of the region, see History of Pomerania.
