= Mazów =

- Village
- Location within Poland
- Coordinates: 54°26′29″N 16°39′7″E
- Country: Poland
- Voivodeship: West Pomeranian
- County: Sławno
- Gmina: Postomino

Mazów (Polish pronunciation: [ˈmazuf]; German: Meitzow) is a village in the administrative district of Gmina Postomino, within Sławno County, West Pomeranian Voivodeship, in north-western Poland. It lies approximately 8 km (5 mi) south-west of Postomino, 9 km (6 mi) north of Sławno, and 177 km (110 mi) north-east of the regional capital Szczecin. For the history of the region, see History of Pomerania.
