= Chudaczewko =

- Village
- Location within Poland
- Coordinates: 54°27′10″N 16°39′21″E
- Country: Poland
- Voivodeship: West Pomeranian
- County: Sławno
- Gmina: Postomino

Chudaczewko (Polish pronunciation: [xudaˈt͡ʂɛfkɔ]; formerly German: Neu Kuddezow) is a village in the administrative district of Gmina Postomino, within Sławno County, West Pomeranian Voivodeship, in north-western Poland. It lies approximately 7 km (4 mi) south-west of Postomino, 10 km (6 mi) north of Sławno, and 178 km (111 mi) north-east of the regional capital Szczecin.

For the history of the region, see History of Pomerania.
