= Korlino =

- Village
- Location within Poland
- Coordinates: 54°30′36″N 16°37′26″E
- Country: Poland
- Voivodeship: West Pomeranian
- County: Sławno
- Gmina: Postomino
- Elevation: 10 m (33 ft)

Korlino (Polish pronunciation: [kɔrˈlinɔ]; German: Körlin) is a village in the administrative district of Gmina Postomino, within Sławno County, West Pomeranian Voivodeship, in north-western Poland. It lies approximately 7 km (4 mi) west of Postomino, 17 km (11 mi) north of Sławno, and 181 km (112 mi) north-east of the regional capital Szczecin.

For the history of the region, see History of Pomerania.
