= Ronino =

- Village
- Location within Poland
- Coordinates: 54°28′22″N 16°37′57″E
- Country: Poland
- Voivodeship: West Pomeranian
- County: Sławno
- Gmina: Postomino

Ronino [rɔˈninɔ] is a village in the administrative district of Gmina Postomino, within Sławno County, West Pomeranian Voivodeship, in north-western Poland. It lies approximately 6 km (4 mi) south-west of Postomino, 13 km (8 mi) north of Sławno, and 179 km (111 mi) north-east of the regional capital Szczecin.

For the history of the region, see History of Pomerania.
