= Wykroty =

Wykroty may refer to the following places in Poland:

- Wykroty, Lower Silesian Voivodeship (south-west Poland)
- Wykroty, West Pomeranian Voivodeship (north-west Poland)
