= Nosalinek =

- Settlement
- Location within Poland
- Coordinates: 54°26′8″N 16°45′58″E
- Country: Poland
- Voivodeship: West Pomeranian
- County: Sławno
- Gmina: Postomino

Nosalinek (Polish pronunciation: [nɔsaˈlinɛk]; formerly German: Neu Nitzlin) is a settlement in the administrative district of Gmina Postomino, within Sławno County, West Pomeranian Voivodeship, in north-western Poland. It lies approximately 8 km (5 mi) south-east of Postomino, 10 km (6 mi) north-east of Sławno, and 183 km (114 mi) north-east of the regional capital Szczecin.

For the history of the region, see History of Pomerania.
