= Kanin, West Pomeranian Voivodeship =

Kanin
- Village
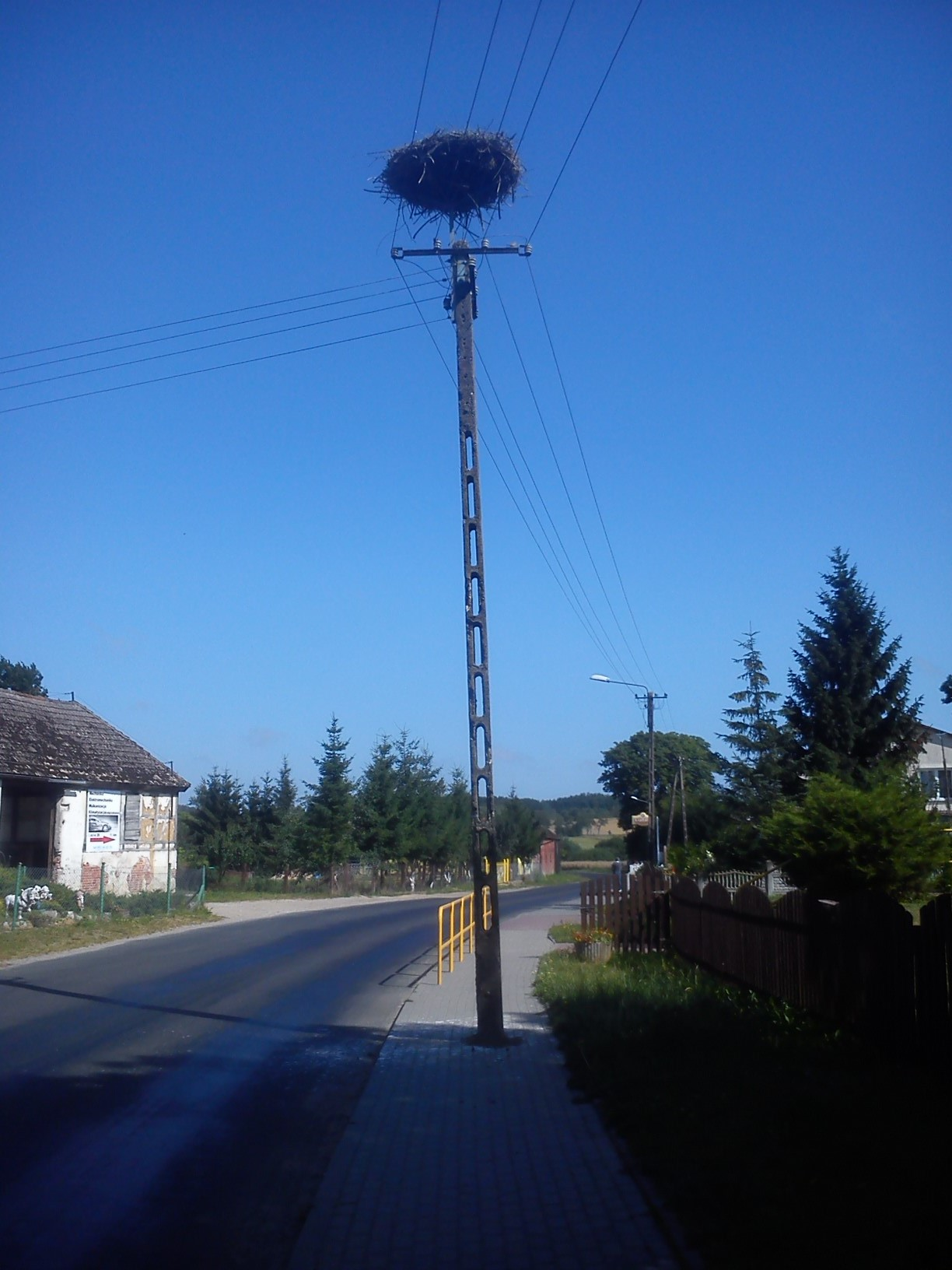

- Location within Poland
- Coordinates: 54°27′55″N 16°35′15″E
- Country: Poland
- Voivodeship: West Pomeranian
- County: Sławno
- Gmina: Postomino
- Postal code: 76-113

Kanin (Polish pronunciation: [ˈkanin]; formerly German: Kannin) is a village in the administrative district of Gmina Postomino, within Sławno County, West Pomeranian Voivodeship, in north-western Poland. It lies approximately 9 km (6 mi) west of Postomino, 13 km (8 mi) north-west of Sławno, and 176 km (109 mi) north-east of the regional capital Szczecin.
