= Królewko =

Polish village

- Settlement
- Location within Poland
- Coordinates: 54°29′34″N 16°38′55″E
- Country: Poland
- Voivodeship: West Pomeranian
- County: Sławno
- Gmina: Postomino

Królewko (Polish pronunciation: [kruˈlɛfkɔ]; formerly German: Neu Krolow) is a settlement in the administrative district of Gmina Postomino, within Sławno County, West Pomeranian Voivodeship, in north-western Poland. It lies approximately 5 km (3 mi) west of Postomino, 15 km (9 mi) north of Sławno, and 181 km (112 mi) north-east of the regional capital Szczecin. For the history of the region, see History of Pomerania.
