= Pałówko =

- Village
- Location within Poland
- Coordinates: 54°26′8″N 16°49′13″E
- Country: Poland
- Voivodeship: West Pomeranian
- County: Sławno
- Gmina: Postomino
- Elevation: 50 m (160 ft)
- Population: 247
- Website: http://www.palowko.ovh.org/

Pałówko (Polish pronunciation: [paˈwufkɔ]; formerly German: Neu Paalow) is a village in the administrative district of Gmina Postomino, within Sławno County, West Pomeranian Voivodeship, in north-western Poland. It lies approximately 10 km (6 mi) south-east of Postomino, 12 km (7 mi) north-east of Sławno, and 186 km (116 mi) north-east of the regional capital Szczecin.

For the history of the region, see History of Pomerania.

The village has a population of 247.
