= Czarna Buda =

- Settlement
- Location within Poland
- Coordinates: 54°26′49″N 16°36′4″E
- Country: Poland
- Voivodeship: West Pomeranian
- County: Sławno
- Gmina: Postomino

Czarna Buda [ˈt͡ʂarna ˈbuda] is a settlement in the administrative district of Gmina Postomino, within Sławno County, West Pomeranian Voivodeship, in north-western Poland. It lies approximately 10 km (6 mi) south-west of Postomino, 11 km (7 mi) north-west of Sławno, and 175 km (109 mi) north-east of the regional capital Szczecin.

For the history of the region, see History of Pomerania.
