= Chudaczewo =

- Village
- Location within Poland
- Coordinates: 54°28′41″N 16°38′59″E
- Country: Poland
- Voivodeship: West Pomeranian
- County: Sławno
- Gmina: Postomino
- Population: 240

Chudaczewo [xudaˈt͡ʂɛvɔ] (German: Alt Kuddezow) is a village in the administrative district of Gmina Postomino, within Sławno County, West Pomeranian Voivodeship, in north-western Poland. It lies approximately 5 km (3 mi) south-west of Postomino, 13 km (8 mi) north of Sławno, and 180 km (112 mi) north-east of the regional capital Szczecin.

The village has a population of 240.

== See also ==
- History of Pomerania
