= Królewo, West Pomeranian Voivodeship =

Królewo
- Village
- Location within Poland
- Coordinates: 54°30′53″N 16°39′17″E
- Country: Poland
- Voivodeship: West Pomeranian
- County: Sławno
- Gmina: Postomino
- Population: 706

Królewo (Polish pronunciation: [kruˈlɛvɔ]; German: Krolow) is a village in the administrative district of Gmina Postomino, within Sławno County, West Pomeranian Voivodeship, in north-western Poland. It lies approximately 5 km (3 mi) north-west of Postomino, 17 km (11 mi) north of Sławno, and 183 km (114 mi) north-east of the regional capital Szczecin.

For the history of the region, see History of Pomerania.

The village has a population of 706.
