= Tłuki, West Pomeranian Voivodeship =

Tłuki
- Settlement
- Location within Poland
- Coordinates: 54°26′53″N 16°45′13″E
- Country: Poland
- Voivodeship: West Pomeranian
- County: Sławno
- Gmina: Postomino

Tłuki [ˈtwuki] is a settlement in the administrative district of Gmina Postomino, within Sławno County, West Pomeranian Voivodeship, in north-western Poland. It lies approximately 6 km (4 mi) south-east of Postomino, 11 km (7 mi) north-east of Sławno, and 183 km (114 mi) north-east of the regional capital Szczecin.

For the history of the region, see History of Pomerania.
