= TYN =

TYN may stand for:

- Taiyuan Wusu International Airport (IATA code)
- Traditionalist Youth Network, an ideological group in the United States of America
- Tynong railway station, Australia

== See also ==
- Tyn (disambiguation)
