= Wola Łużańska =

- Village
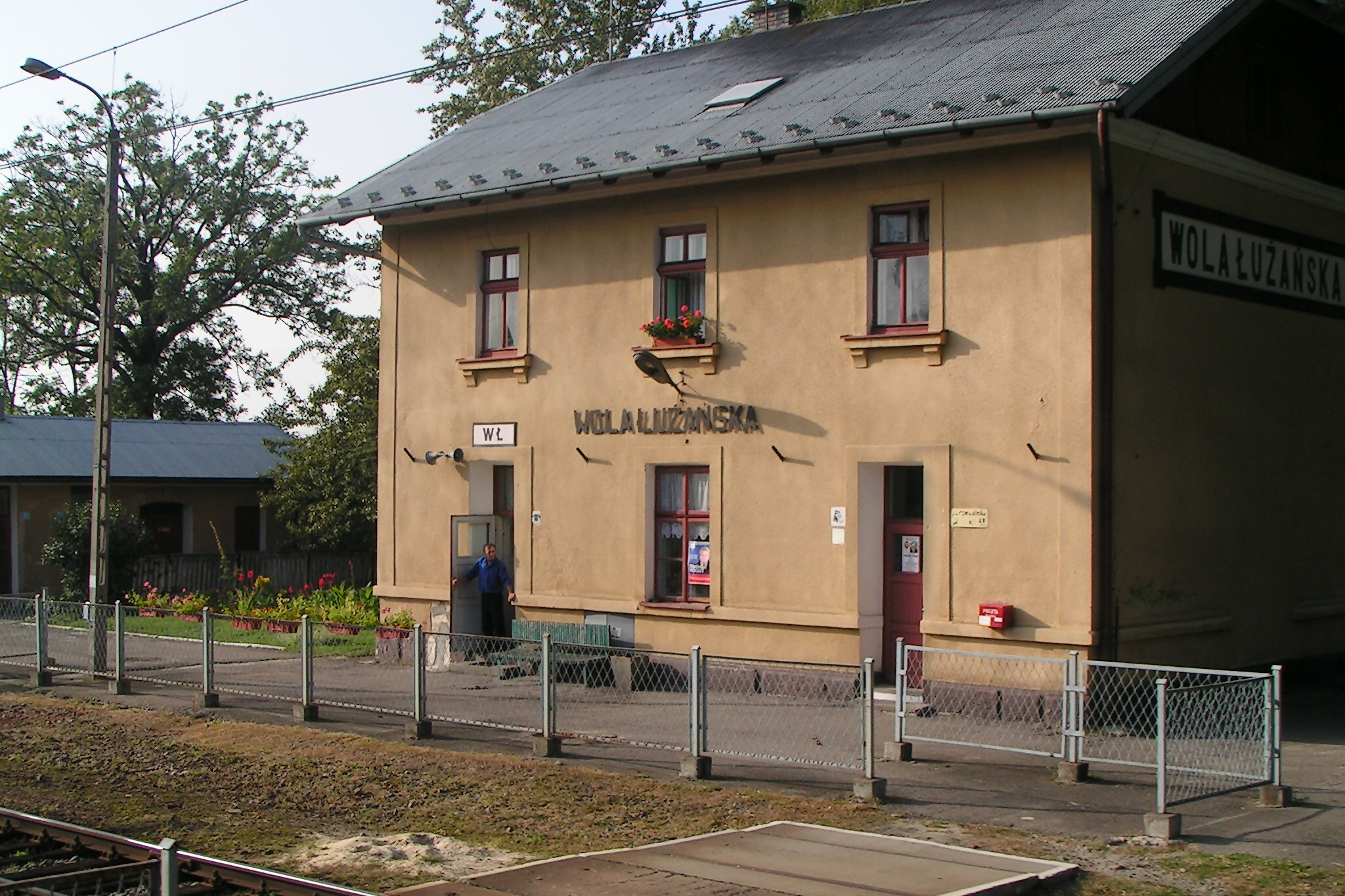
- Railway station

- Location within Poland
- Coordinates: 49°42′N 21°4′E
- Country: Poland
- Voivodeship: Lesser Poland
- County: Gorlice
- Gmina: Łużna
- Population: 996

Wola Łużańska [ˈvɔla wuˈʐaɲska] is a village in the administrative district of Gmina Łużna, within Gorlice County, Lesser Poland Voivodeship, in southern Poland.
