= Axel Springer =

German publisher (1912–1985)

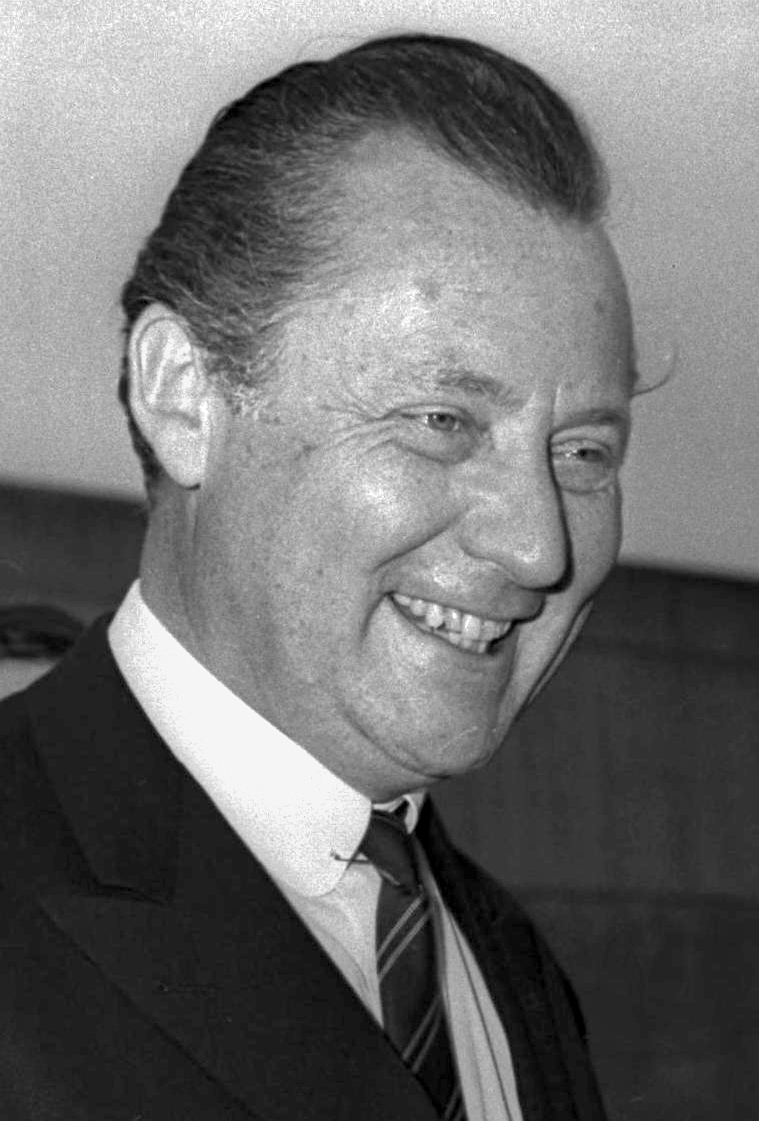
- Springer in 1966
- Born: Axel Cäsar Springer; 2 May 1912; Altona, Hamburg, Germany
- Died: 22 September 1985 (aged 73); West Berlin, West Germany
- Occupations: Business, publishing
- Spouse(s): Martha Else Meyer (1933–1938, divorced); Erna Frieda Berta Holm (1939–?, divorced); Rosemarie Alsen (née Lorenz) (1953–1961, divorced); Helga Alsen (née Ludewig) (1962–?, divorced); Friede Springer (1978–1985)
- Children: 3
- Relatives: Werner Lorenz (father-in-law)

Axel Cäsar Springer (2 May 1912 – 22 September 1985) was a West German publisher and founder of what is now Axel Springer SE, the largest media publishing firm in Europe. By the early 1960s his print titles dominated the West German daily press market. His Bild Zeitung became the nation's tabloid.

In the late 1960s, Springer entered into confrontation with the emergent New Left. Hostile coverage of student protests and a continuing rightward drift in editorial comment were met with boycotts and printing-press blockades, and later in 1972 with the bombing of the company offices by the Red Army Faction (the "Baader Meinhof Gang").

In the late 1970s, exposés of journalistic malpractice by the investigative reporter Günter Wallraff led to Press Council reprimands. Sometimes referred to as Germany's Rupert Murdoch, Springer, with counter suits and minor divestments, was able to ride out public criticism of his editorial ethics and market dominance.

Springer engaged in private diplomacy in Moscow in 1958 and, with greater recognition, in Jerusalem in 1966 and 1967. In addition to promotion and defence of the values of the "Western family of nations" and NATO, Springer declared "reconciliation of Jews and Germans and support for the vital rights of the State of Israel" to be a leitmotif of his company's journalism.

== Career under the Hitler regime ==
Axel Caesar Springer was born on 2 May 1912 in Altona, a borough of Hamburg, the son of Ottilie (née Müller) and Hinrich Springer. The senior Springer owned a small printing and publishing firm, Hammerich & Lesser-Verla, and was the treasurer of the centrist or centre-left German Democratic Party (Deutsche Demokratische Partei).

After being apprenticed as a compositor he worked on his father’s paper, Altonaer Nachrichten. Following Hitler's assumption of untrammeled power in 1933, new press ordinances made Springer directly accountable to the Ministry of Propaganda, although as editor of the sports and business pages he may have remained relatively free of Nazi-party dictation. After paper shortages shut the daily in 1941, he stayed with the firm printing literary works until Allied air raids in 1944 destroyed both the business premises and the family home.

Notwithstanding its vilification by the Nazis, Springer was a jazz enthusiast. He played with the possibility of a career in music. His model was the Austrian tenor Richard Tauber, a star of both film and operatic stage who, having a Jewish parent, was also deprecated by the regime.

In 1933, Springer married Martha Else Meyer, whose father (like Tauber's) was Jewish. They divorced in 1938. While the divorce papers list Springer's infidelity as grounds (he would have five wives over the course of his 73 years), by 1938 it was clear that his marriage to a person classified, under the new race laws, as a "half-Jew", a Mischling, would bar him as an editor and publisher. Springer would later support both Meyer and her mother, who survived the Theresienstadt Ghetto. After the war Springer commented: "I cannot say I didn't know what was happening. In 1933 I stood on the Kurfürstendamm in Berlin and watched Nazi Storm Troopers beating up old Jews. I was a young man, and I couldn't do anything about it. But I never forgot it".

In 1934, Springer joined the National Socialist Motorist Corps (Nationalsozialistisches Kraftfahrkorps, NSKK). He later claimed that this was to secure "a Nazi-uniformed buffer" for his family "in an organization that did not make any major ideological commitments and that allowed politics to be combined with the motorsport that I loved so much.” Other NSKK members who would go on to occupy prominent positions in the post-war Federal Republic offered similar careerist explanations, among them Springer's future rival in publishing Franz Burda, Franz Josef Strauss who was to lead Bavaria's ruling Christian Social Union, and (a purportedly inactive party member) Kurt Georg Kiesinger, West Germany's third Chancellor. Contrary to their picture of a relatively "apolitical" motorist club, the NSKK was a paramilitary organisation, implicated in the regime's racist policy of exclusion and discrimination (it screened its members for Aryan traits) and in the anti-semitic pogroms of 1938.

== German press lord ==
=== From Hörzu to Bild and Die Welt ===
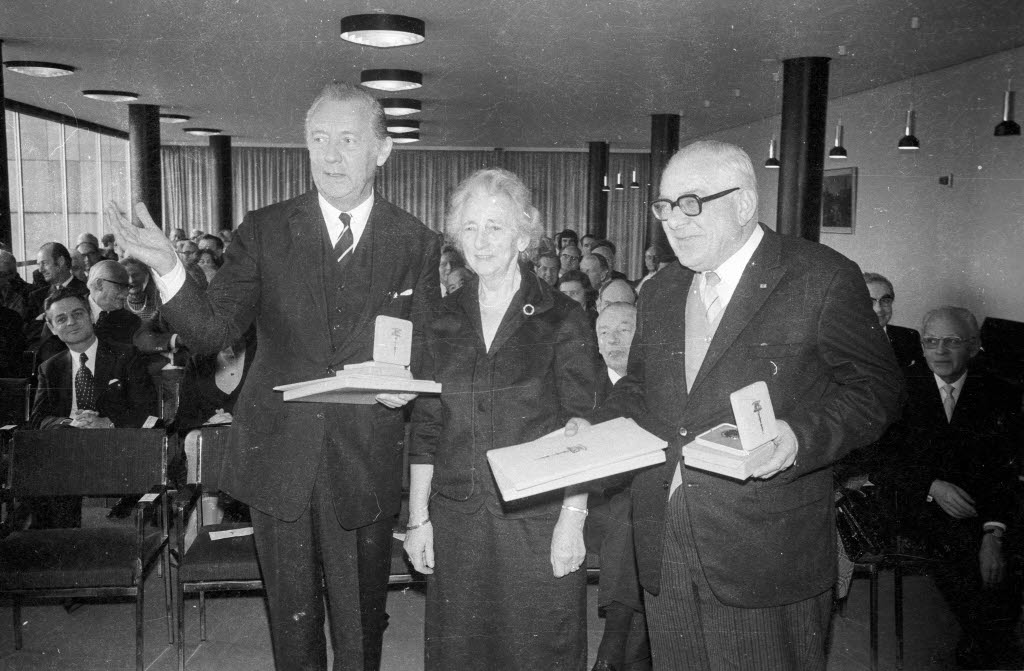
Springer (left) in 1974

After the war, in 1946, Springer founded his own publishing company, Axel Springer GmbH, in Hamburg publishing the radio (and later TV) listings magazine Hörzu. Never having worn a uniform (thanks to asthma and diabetes) or been a member of the Nazi party (from which, by virtue of his marriage to Martha Meyer, he would have been excluded), Springer was able to obtain from the British occupation authorities a license to run a newspaper. His first daily was the Hamburger Abendblatt. Competing in Hamburg with the five other dailies, Springer offered a paper he described as "geared to the underdog and the little man", and perfected a formula he launched on the national market in 1952 with Bild Zeitung.

Fed a tabloid mix of sensation, scandal, celebrity, sports and horoscopes, the Bild readership peaked in the mid-1960s at 4.5 million. It had the largest circulation of any newspaper in Western Europe or North America. Bild allowed Springer the luxury of his 1953 acquisition, the national broadsheet Die Welt, a loss maker but a rival to the newspapers of record, Die Zeit and the Süddeutsche Zeitung.

In 1956, Springer secured a 26% share in Berlin's prestigious Ullstein publishing house, which in 1952 had been restored to the Jewish family who had originally owned it. He became the majority shareholder at the end of 1959 acquiring, among other titles, the Berliner Morgenpost. Springer celebrated Ullstein as having been, in the Weimar years, the symbol of a Jewish-German liberal-democratic tradition, but at the same time his critics were to note, in line with Die Welt and Bild, a decisive rightward shift in editorial policy.

=== Zehrer and the approach to Moscow ===
Springer's choice as chief editor for Die Welt was controversial. Hans Zehrer was a veteran of the Kapp Putsch of 1920, and in the last Weimar years had been the editor of the nationalist and anti-republican journal Die Tat. In 1946, he had been removed from the then British-controlled Die Welt after protests from Britain's Labour government and from the Social Democrats then governing Hamburg.

At Die Welt Springer allowed Zehrer to entertain the idea of an Austrian solution for Germany. In 1955, Austria had regained its unity and independence through a four-power agreement guaranteeing the country's non-alignment and neutrality. In January 1958, Springer travelled with Zehrer to Moscow. Before departing he told a reporter: "I know very well that there are people who consider me naïve. But I believe in reunification within five years." In addition to permanent German neutrality, Springer was proposing a nuclear-free Central Europe.

Nikita Khrushchev kept Springer and Zehrer waiting sixteen days for an interview. It did not go well, and cannot have been helped by Springer seeking to convince the Soviet premier of the advantages not only of German neutrality but also of West Germany's social market economy. The Russians, like the Americans, viewed their strategic position in Germany as indispensable. Neutrality was not an option. Springer was to describe the trip as the "central political event of my life", convincing him that there was no alternative to Konrad Adenauer's Westbindung: to discount Communist overtures and to persevere with the North Atlantic alliance. On his return he forbad any criticism of the western allies, whether it was of the British in Cyprus, the French in Algeria, or the Americans in the Taiwan Strait, because "we need them in Berlin".

== Alleged American funding ==
There are questions as to how in the lean post-war years Springer was able to finance so large and rapid an expansion. He operated without partners; even after currency reform in 1948, for a relative upstart bank credit would have been difficult to come by, and his first stock for public subscription was not issued until months before his death in 1985.

There were rumours that Springer in the early post-war years was the beneficiary of covert U.S. efforts to shape and direct public opinion in Germany. According to the American investigative journalist Murray Waas, "highly reliable sources in the U.S. intelligence community" testified to the figure of "some $7 million" funnelled through the CIA to Springer in the early 1950s. The case appears otherwise circumstantial, based on Springer's editorial support of U.S. foreign policy. There was no mistaking Springer's anti-communism; he favoured Social Democrat Kurt Schumacher's description of communists as rotlackierte Nazis ("red-painted Nazis").

Given his dalliance with neutralism, his fixed alignment with American "geopolitical interests" can be dated only from his return from Moscow in 1958. It is also possible that CIA funding is confused with support from the Government and Relief in Occupied Areas (GARIOA) programme (wound up in October 1950), to which Die Zeit and other pro-democratic and pro-Allied publishing efforts are known to have benefitted. Springer always maintained that his financial springboard was Hörzu which, attuned to the new radio and television age, was ground breaking and had no market rival.

== The Spiegel affair ==
On 26 October 1962, the Hamburg offices of Der Spiegel were raided and closed by police. The publisher, Rudolf Augstein, along with the weekly's two editors-in-chief and a reporter were arrested. Defence minister Franz Josef Strauss levelled accusations of treason (Landesverrat) in respect to an article detailing NATO projections of "unimaginable chaos" in the event of a Soviet nuclear strike and criticising the government's lack of preparedness. In a statement he was later obliged to recant, Strauss denied that he had initiated the police action.

Although Augstein was a liberal critic, Springer offered his presses, teletypes and office space so Der Spiegel could keep on publishing. It was, however, at the cost of further access to Die Welt that columnist Sebastian Haffner took to the Süddeutsche Zeitung to pronounce on the violation of press freedom and constitutional norms.

Adenauer appears to have been sufficiently convinced of Springer's political reliability, that when in October 1963 he resigned as chancellor, he suggested (perhaps playfully) to Bild Editor-in-Chief Peter Boenisch that the publisher might be the "politician" best fitted to continue his policies.

== Criticism and confrontation ==
=== The SDS Anti-Springer campaign ===
The Spiegel affair ignited youth protest and brought the Sozialistischer Deutscher Studentenbund (SDS), the German Socialist Student Union, onto the streets. Swift to denounce those who questioned the equity and social costs of the West German Wirtschaftswunder ("economic miracle"), Springer characterised the "extra-parliamentary opposition" as subversive.

In June 1967 an open letter from a large group of writers (among them Ingeborg Drewitz, Hans Magnus Enzensberger and Günter Grass), accused the Springer Press of "incitement" in a police riot in West Berlin that saw the death of student protester Benno Ohnesorg. Rallied by Ulrike Meinhof's journal konkret, students had been protesting a visit by the Shah of Iran. Bild's response (3 June 1967) to the death was to declare that where "Students threaten: We shoot back" and "This is where fun and compromise and democratic tolerance end. We have to take a stand against SA methods". Protesters broke windows at Springer offices and tried to disrupt printing and delivery, but the trade unions kept their distance from the anti-Springer campaign, and the SDS, increasingly focussed on the War in Vietnam, conceded that the protests had failed to "mobilise the masses". After a month it called a halt.

When on 11 April 1968, the SDS leader Rudi Dutschke (who had called for the expropriation of Springer's press empire) was shot on the street in West Berlin by the young right-wing extremist Josef Bachmann, the cry again was that Bild was complicit ("Bild schoss mit!"). Serious unrest followed . Demonstrators tried to storm the Springer house in Berlin and set fire to Bild delivery vans. The Hamburg print shop was besieged to prevent the paper leaving the presses, and in Munich a demonstrator and a policeman were killed after students ransacked the Bild editorial offices. There were over a thousand arrests. "A tendentious headline in Bild", the protesters claimed, "is more violence than a stone against the head of a policeman".

Helmut Schmidt, then parliamentary leader of the Social Democrats, sought to intervene with Springer. Schmidt conceded that the publisher's success was related to new journalistic methods and formats that catered to public tastes, but charged Springer with using that position of preeminence to mix "news and suggestive commentary". He might have "fewer problems" if he restructured his publishing house on the model of private foundations or public media institutions. In the event, when finally Springer consented to meet with Schmidt in August 1968, their discussion was of the Czechoslovak crisis (Schmidt assuring Springer that it was "impossible" that the Soviets would repeat the events of Budapest 1956 and crush the Prague Spring with tanks).

On 19 May 1972, the Red Army Faction (the "Baader Meinhof Gang") bombed Springer's Hamburg offices, injuring 17 employees, two of them seriously. Springer critics regretted the escalation, but accepted the thesis of The Lost Honour of Katharina Blum, or: How violence develops and where it can lead, Heinrich Böll's 1974 novel in which violence is framed and driven by a demagogic and unscrupulous tabloid press. "No one", Haffner argued in liberal weekly Stern, "has planted the seeds of violence more keenly than Springer journalism".

=== Investigations ===
Springer declared that no government minister need tell him "what the people think". Critics, however, focussed less on his supposedly canny sense for the public, than on his press capacity to shape opinion. It was said that Federal ministers began each day by "combing Die Welt for signs of whether Springer was smiling of frowning on them." If only in its headline, the front page of Bild was also seen as "agenda setting".

In 1968, a government commission concluded that the degree of control Springer had achieved over the publishing industry in West Germany (40% of newspapers and about 20% of magazines) threatened the constitutionally guaranteed freedom of the press. But official steps towards decartelisation were successfully pre-empted by Springer's sale of a half dozen of his lesser titles. A critical test of his ability to manage and deflect concern over media concentration might have come only with the introduction of commercial television, and that was delayed in West Germany until 1984, the year before he died. (Willi Brandt recalls that his "friendly relations" with Axel Springer first suffered in the early 1960s when, as governing mayor of West Berlin, he had declined Springer's request to help him open the Federal Republic to commercial television by licensing a local broadcaster).

A more serious embarrassment for Springer were the investigations of journalist Günter Wallraff. In 1977, his employment, undercover, as an editor for Bild led to exposés, (Der Aufmacher – a pun meaning both "Lead Story" and "the one who opens" – and Zeugen der Anklage, "Witnesses for the Prosecution") of the kinds of journalistic malpractices and unethical research methods Böll had depicted in his novel (directed in 1975 as a film by Volker Schlöndorff and Margarethe von Trotta). Wallraff (denounced by Springer as a "liar", a "psychopath" and an "underground communist") noted that "Bild regularly broke into the private, even intimate sphere of the people it was reporting about", and he claimed to have seen suicide notes written by people who had their lives publicly scandalised by the paper.

The German Press Council issued Bild six reprimands. After extended legal action brought by Springer, a Federal court in 1981 ruled in favour of Wallraff. It said his writings had focused on "an aberration in journalism, the discussion of which should be of great interest to the public." Injunctions nonetheless prevented publication of some of the most damning material. Un-redacted copies of Wallraff's original reporting were not published until 2012.

== Opposition to Brandt and Ostpolitik ==
Springer maintained a position, not itself welcome on the conservative right, that Germans had themselves to blame for their country's division: "What Germany did under Hitler was terrible, and we were destined to suffer for it". But noting that "the people in the other part of Germany were no more guilty than those of us over here", he insisted that they deserved the "same kind of chance" at rehabilitation that democratic and market freedoms had allowed their compatriots in the west. On that basis, he refused any recognition that might "normalise" the East German SED regime. When the Wall went up in Berlin in 1961, Springer built his 22-storey headquarters flush up against it in the centre of the city, so that every day it might look over, and be seen from, what his writers regularly referred to as the Soviet Occupation Zone (German: Sowjetische Besatzungszone or SBZ). While dissenters, such as Sebastian Haffner, concluded that there was now no alternative to formal recognition, Springer was unyielding. He condemned the accommodationist Ostpolitik pursued from 1969 by Brandt.

Springer's hostility to the SED regime was reciprocated. Over the course of two years from 1968 to 1970, GDR state television aired a lavishly produced 10-hour miniseries, Ich – Axel Cäsar Springer, depicting the media magnate as the puppet of a secretive, post-war Nazi cabal. At the same time, the East Germans were so impressed by the seeming power of Bild that between 1957 and 1973 they attempted, with different tabloid formats, to sell their own their NEUE Bild Zeitung to West Germans crossing the border.

Springer's efforts, which his writers may have understood as a general means of discrediting the Social Democrats, were unavailing. Blue-collar workers who formed the core of Bild's now declining readership (down 800,000 by 1972) voted for Brandt regardless. Significantly Springer, who had always cited the "poll" at the newspaper and magazine kiosk (Abstimmung am Kiosk) as the ultimate justification for his journalism, no matter how controversial, proved willing to adjust. He moved, or parted company with, those in his employ who had been attacking Brandt from ever more extreme right-wing positions. Among these were, Peter Boenisch, chief editor at Bild; and Welt am Sonntag columnist Willi Schlamm (a former Austrian Communist) and an American John Bircher. Once it was clear that the Christian Democrats would not reverse course on recognition, Bild did begin, albeit in quotation marks, to refer to East Germany as the GDR (the German Democratic Republic).

From August 1971 Günter Prinz, Boenisch's successor at Bild, restored the paper's circulation by returning to a less politically charged "mix of sex, facts und fiction".

=== Brandt's Kniefall von Warschau ===
Springer's son, Axel Springer Jr. (1941–1980), was the photographer and journalist "Sven Simon", and was for a period chief editor of Welt am Sonntag. In 1980, at the age of 38, he took his own life. He is perhaps best remembered for his iconic picture of Willi Brandt kneeling (his Kniefall) on 7 December 1970 before the memorial to the Ghetto Uprising in Warsaw.

The occasion of Brandt's visit to Poland was the signing of the Treaty of Warsaw between West Germany and Poland. This recognised the Oder-Neisse Line as Germany's final frontier in the east and, on that basis, established diplomatic relations between the Federal Republic and the People's Republic of Poland. Writing himself in Die Welt, Springer expressed outrage that a democratically elected German government should license a Communist regime in its annexation of a quarter of the country. In Bild, Boenisch remarked that, while Brandt attempted "kneel away" the crimes of the Nazis, the victims of his Stalinist hosts were being made to kneel by rifle butts to the groin.

== Friend of Israel ==
Springer's journalism did not explore the history of the Nazi-era in the manner of Der Spiegel or Stern. Bild editor-in-chief Rudolf Michael (1952–58) was against "educating the readers". Nevertheless, under Karl-Heinz Hagen (1960–62) the newspaper began, sensationally as was its wont, to report on trials of Nazi war criminals, including in 1961 the Jerusalem trial of Adolf Eichmann. This was at a time when surveys suggested that only every second West German supported the prosecutions; that a third wished an end to the discussion of the Hitler regime; and that 73% regarded Jews as "a different race".

Next to post-war Chancellor Konrad Adenauer, it has been said that "no German played a more significant role in the effort to repair his country's burdened relationship with the Jews, and to ensure its support for their state, than Axel Springer." It was a cause to which, as early as 1957, he dedicated his newspapers editorially and to which he made his own personal contributions.

As had Adenauer in the wake of his 1952 Reparations Agreement, Springer found that in Israel "German money" was not universally welcome. During his first visit to Israel in 1966, Springer proposed a donation of 3.6 million Deutsche Mark ($900,000) to The Israel Museum, Jerusalem, which would name an auditorium in his honor. Protesters took to the streets, and the Israeli newspaper LaMerhav declared that for the museum to accept money from a German would be a "disavowal of Jewish memory". (It was ultimately decided that Springer's generosity should be honored by a plaque).

Springer returned to Jerusalem on 10 June 1967, to celebrate, in the company of Viennese-born mayor Teddy Kollek, the conquest of the Old City in the Six-Day War. He had ordered his newspapers to cover the war obsessively and with an unapologetically pro-Israel bias, later joking that he had simply published Israeli newspapers in German. "The Israelis", he commented on the front page of Bild, "have the right to live in peace without permanent new Arab blackmails."

Support for Israel is a commitment of their founder that Axel Springer SE sustains. It remains enshrined in the company's mission statement.

== Honors ==
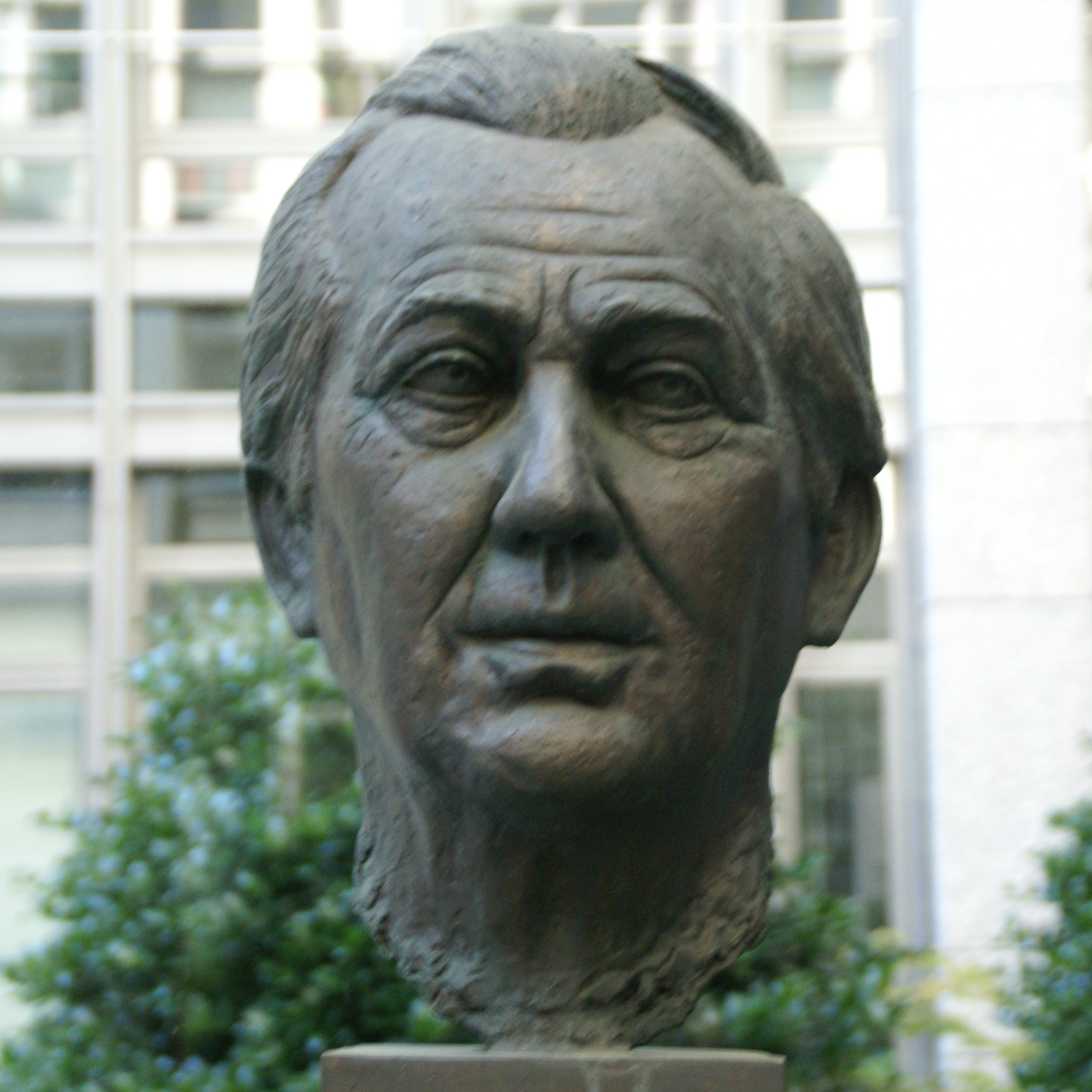
Bronze sculpture of Springer at the courtyard of the Hamburger Abendblatt

Springer received honorary degrees from Bar-Ilan University in Ramat Gan (1974), and the Hebrew University of Jerusalem (1976). In 1977 he received the American Friendship Medal.

In 1978, he was awarded the inaugural Leo Baeck Medal. In 1985, he received the gold medal of the Jewish service organisation B'nai B'rith.

In 1981, Franz Josef Strauss presented Springer the Konrad Adenauer Freedom Prize in recognition of his contribution to the foundation of a liberal press system, his commitment to the reunification of Germany in peace and freedom, and his exemplary activity in support of reconciliation between German and Jewish people.

Posthumously, Springer received both the Hamburg Citizens' Award in 1990 and the Theodor Herzl Prize of the World Jewish Congress in 2014.

== Death ==
Springer died in West Berlin in 1985. His heiress is his fifth (and last) wife Friede Springer (born 1942) who, 30 years Springer's junior, had been his son's nanny.

In 1971, Springer published a collection of his speeches and essays: Von Berlin aus gesehen. Zeugnisse eines engagierten Deutschen (Seewald Verlag, Hamburg).

== See also ==
- William Denholm Barnetson
