= Rosemarie Springer =

German equestrian (1920–2019)

Rosemarie Springer (previously Alsen, née Lorenz; July 5, 1920 – April 2, 2019) was a German equestrian, and the third wife (1953–1961) of Axel Springer, who was founder of what was in 2021 the largest media publishing firm in Europe.

== Early life ==
Born in Danzig, she was the daughter of Werner Lorenz, who would later become an SS member and head of the Hauptamt Volksdeutsche Mittelstelle in Nazi Germany.

== Equestrian career ==
She first rode a horse at the age of two, sitting on her father's lap and took up equestrianism at a young age. Her career was interrupted by World War II, however and she served as a nurse during the conflict. She did not resume riding until 1950 but, soon after, her talents were spotted at a Berlin horse show. Among other international appearances, she participated in the individual dressage event at the 1960 Summer Olympics in Rome, where she finished seventh in a field of seventeen competitors. She retired from active competition in the late 1970s, having been the German national champion in women's dressage seven times. Following her competitive career, Springer took up judging and training, the latter of which occupied her time until at least 2012. In her late 80s she continued to ski twice a year and occasionally ride in informal tournaments in Germany.

== Marriages ==
She married cement manufacturer Horst-Herbert Alsen in 1941 and divorced him in 1953 to marry Alsen's friend and neighbour, journalist Axel Springer. This union lasted until 1961 when Springer left her to marry Helga Ludewig Alsen – curiously, she was the new wife of Horst-Herbert Alsen, who by this had lost two wives to Springer. On her 75th birthday, Springer was honored by the German Equestrian Federation (FN) for her contributions to the sport. She died on April 2, 2019, at the age of 98.
