= Pieszcz =

- Village
- Location within Poland
- Coordinates: 54°27′39″N 16°46′53″E
- Country: Poland
- Voivodeship: West Pomeranian
- County: Sławno
- Gmina: Postomino
- Population: 544

Pieszcz [pjɛʂt͡ʂ] (formerly German Peest) is a village in the administrative district of Gmina Postomino, within Sławno County, West Pomeranian Voivodeship, in north-western Poland. It lies approximately 6 km (4 mi) south-east of Postomino, 13 km (8 mi) north-east of Sławno, and 185 km (115 mi) north-east of the regional capital Szczecin.

For the history of the region, see History of Pomerania.

The village has a population of 544.

== People ==
- Hans Caspar von Krockow (1700-1759), prussian general
