= Głównica =

Location
- Country: Poland

Physical characteristics
- Source
  - location: Wicko
- Mouth
  - location: Baltic Sea
  - coordinates: 54°32′40″N 16°33′06″E

Głównica is a river of Poland. It flows from the lake Wicko to the Baltic Sea near Jarosławiec.
