= Mszanka, West Pomeranian Voivodeship =

Mszanka
- Settlement
- Location within Poland
- Coordinates: 54°27′22″N 16°42′42″E
- Country: Poland
- Voivodeship: West Pomeranian
- County: Sławno
- Gmina: Postomino

Mszanka (Polish pronunciation: [ˈmʂanka]; German: Klein Waldhof) is a settlement in the administrative district of Gmina Postomino, within Sławno County, West Pomeranian Voivodeship, in north-western Poland. It lies approximately 5 km (3 mi) south of Postomino, 11 km (7 mi) north of Sławno, and 181 km (112 mi) north-east of the regional capital Szczecin.

For the history of the region, see History of Pomerania.
