= Wykroty, West Pomeranian Voivodeship =

Wykroty
- Settlement
- Location within Poland
- Coordinates: 54°29′15″N 16°45′11″E
- Country: Poland
- Voivodeship: West Pomeranian
- County: Sławno
- Gmina: Postomino

Wykroty [vɨˈkrɔtɨ] (German: Grünhof) is a settlement in the administrative district of Gmina Postomino, within Sławno County, West Pomeranian Voivodeship, in north-western Poland. It lies approximately 3 km (2 mi) east of Postomino, 15 km (9 mi) north of Sławno, and 186 km (116 mi) north-east of the regional capital Szczecin.

For the history of the region, see History of Pomerania.

== History ==
From 1725 to 1945, Grünhof was part of the Schlawe district in the Köslin district of the Prussian province of Pomerania .

== Notable residents ==
- Werner Lorenz (1891–1974), SS-officer
