= Pałowo =

- Village
- Location within Poland
- Coordinates: 54°26′28″N 16°48′32″E
- Country: Poland
- Voivodeship: West Pomeranian
- County: Sławno
- Gmina: Postomino
- Population: 223
- Website: http://palowo.ovh.org/

Pałowo (Polish pronunciation: [paˈwɔvɔ]; German: Alt Paalow) is a village in the administrative district of Gmina Postomino, within Sławno County, West Pomeranian Voivodeship, in north-western Poland. It lies approximately 9 km (6 mi) south-east of Postomino, 12 km (7 mi) north-east of Sławno, and 185 km (115 mi) north-east of the regional capital Szczecin.

For the history of the region, see History of Pomerania.

The village has a population of 223.
