= Biesna =

- Village
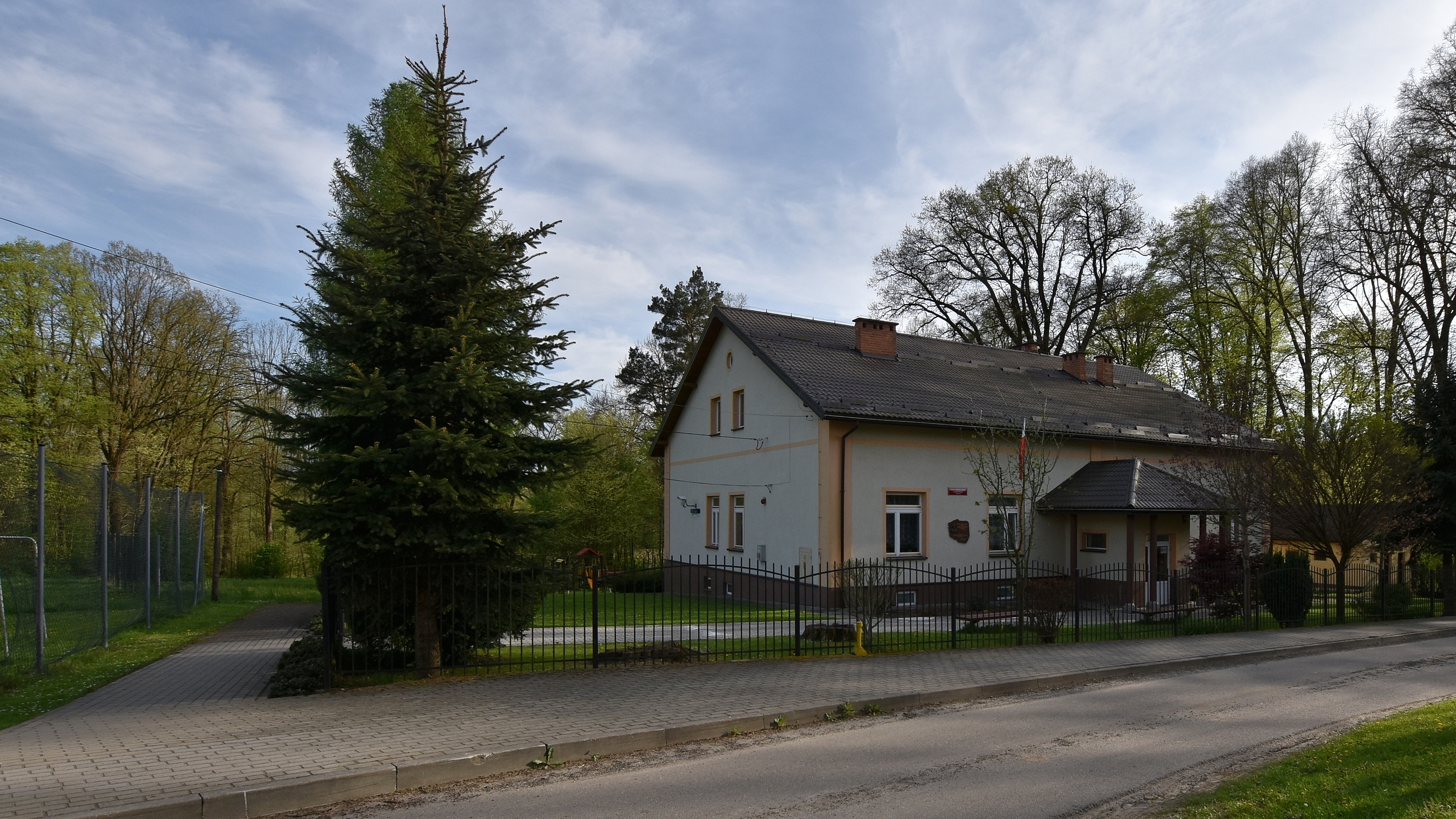

- Location within Poland
- Coordinates: 49°44′N 21°1′E
- Country: Poland
- Voivodeship: Lesser Poland
- County: Gorlice
- Gmina: Łużna

Biesna [ˈbjɛsna] is a village in the administrative district of Gmina Łużna, within Gorlice County, Lesser Poland Voivodeship, in southern Poland.
