= Szalowa =

- Village
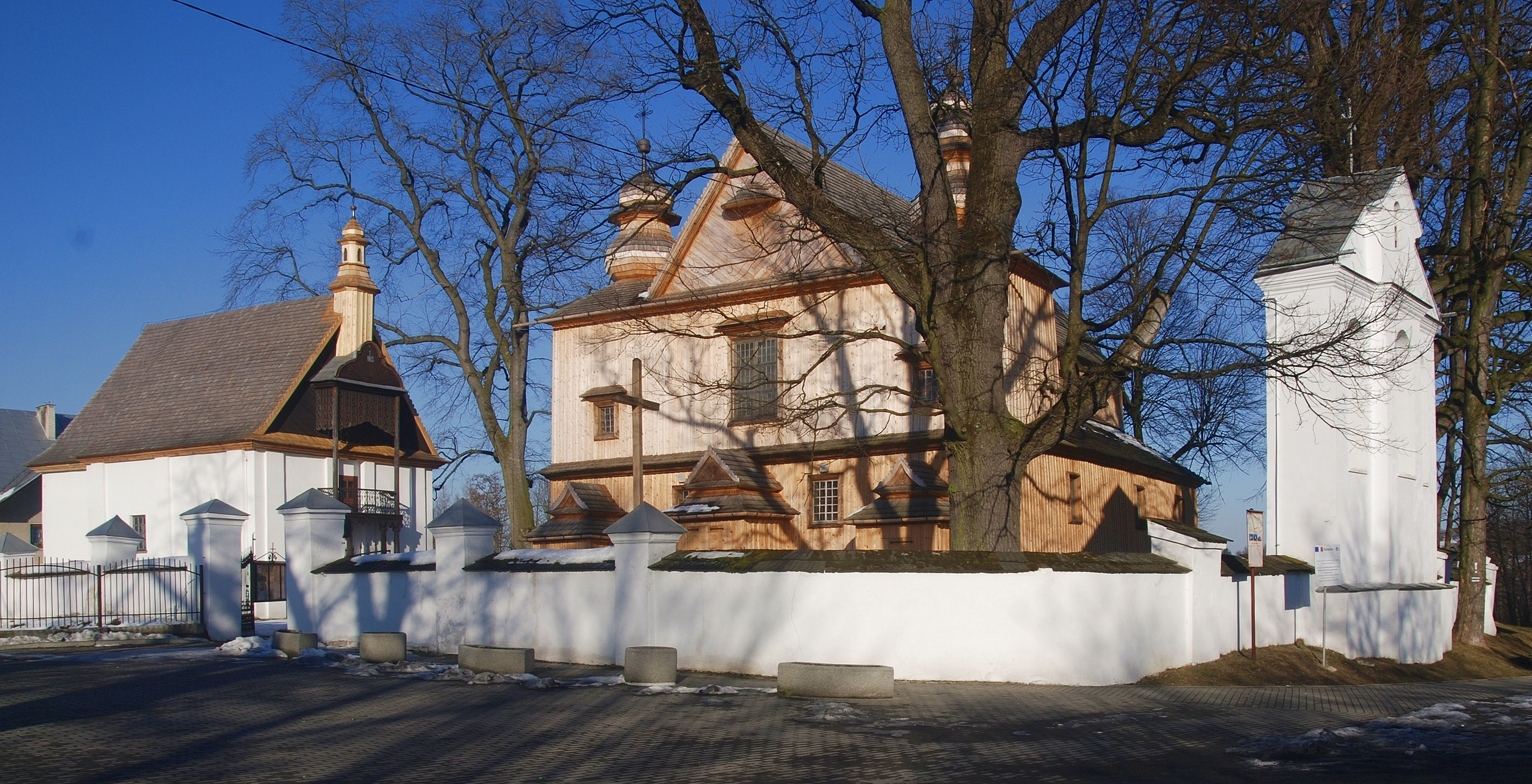
- St. Michael's Church

- Location within Poland
- Coordinates: 49°40′56″N 21°1′23″E
- Country: Poland
- Voivodeship: Lesser Poland
- County: Gorlice
- Gmina: Łużna
- Population: 2,468
- Website: http://www.szalowa.pl

Szalowa [ʂaˈlɔva] is a village in the administrative district of Gmina Łużna, within Gorlice County, Lesser Poland Voivodeship, in southern Poland.

The main church, St. Michael's, a wooden church built in the 18th century, is on the National Historic registry.

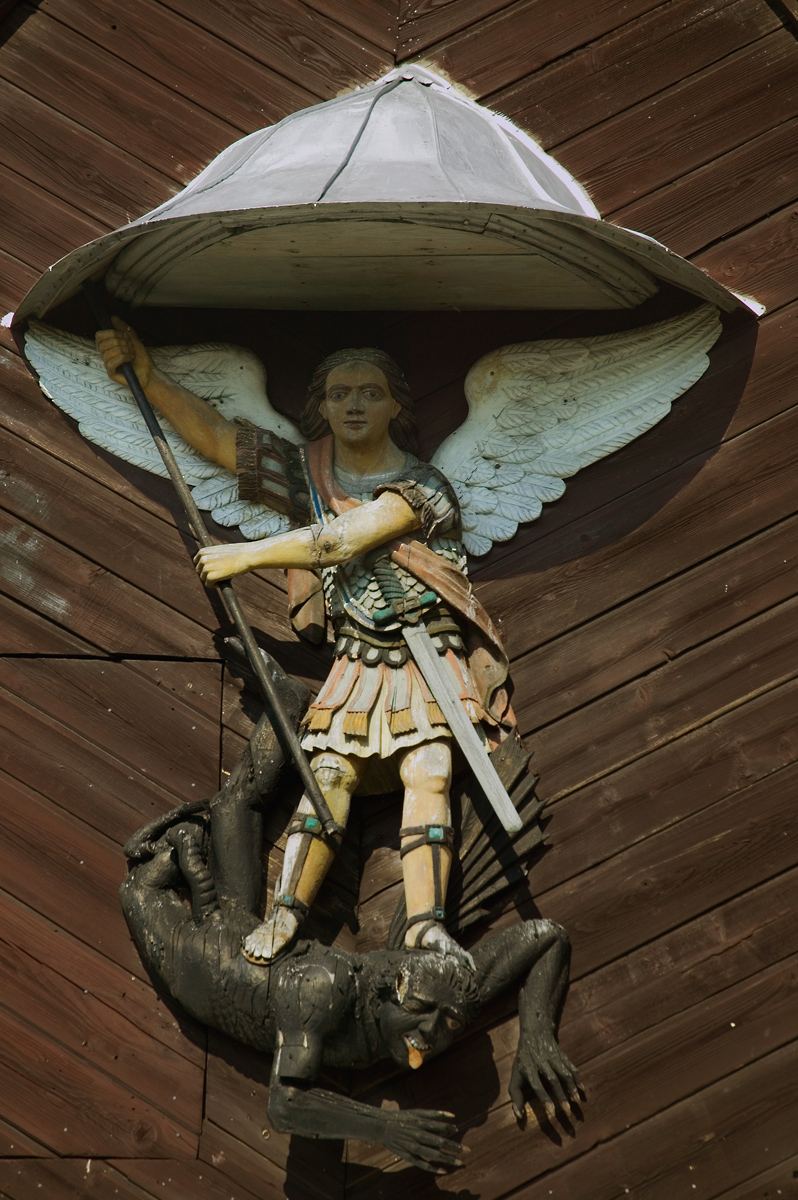
Wood sculpture of Archangel Michael, atop the church in Szalowa (18th century).
