= Oscar Krackow von Wickerode =

German painter

Oscar Krackow Graf von Wickerode (1826–1871) was a German animal painter.

Wickerode was born at Thine in Pomerania. At the age of seventeen he entered the studio of Wilhelm Krause. In 1849 he went to Munich, in order to pursue his studies under Albert Zimmermann; during 1856–59 he lived in Paris; he then travelled in to Tyrol, Switzerland, Italy, and Russia, where he spent nine months in the forest of Bielowicz, studying the habits of the buffalo. At the close of these travels he settled in Berlin, where he died in 1871.

As a passionate sportsman Wickerode loved to depict game, a talent which Zimmerman pointed out to him. Among his works are The Crags of the Lauteschthal, Tyrol, Evening on the Banks of the Narewka, Buffalo Hunt, and A Buffalo Cow Defending her Calf Against Wolves.
