= Bieśnik, Gorlice County =

Bieśnik
- Village
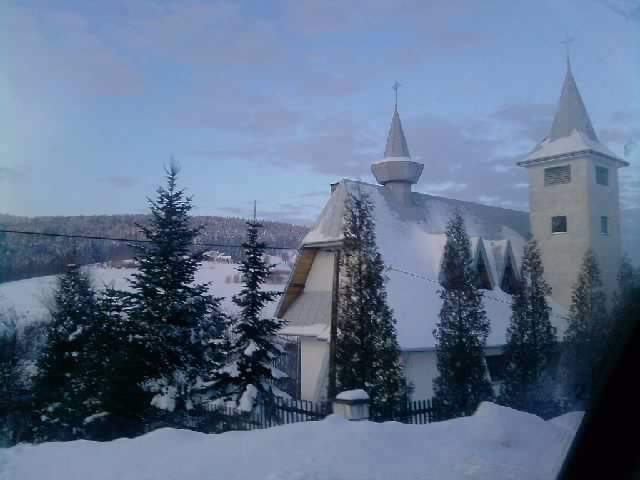
- Catholic church

- Location within Poland
- Coordinates: 49°40′2″N 21°2′25″E
- Country: Poland
- Voivodeship: Lesser Poland
- County: Gorlice
- Gmina: Łużna

Bieśnik [ˈbjɛɕnik] is a village in the administrative district of Gmina Łużna, within Gorlice County, Lesser Poland Voivodeship, in southern Poland.
