= Gmina Łużna =

Gmina Łużna Łużna Commune
- Gmina
- Coat of arms
- Interactive map of Gmina Łużna
- Coordinates (Łużna): 49°42′45″N 21°3′2″E
- Country: Poland
- Voivodeship: (Lesser Poland Voivodeship) Lesser Poland
- County: Gorlice
- Seat: Łużna

Area
  - Total: 56.24 km^{2} (21.71 sq mi)

Population (2006)
  - Total: 8,202
  - Density: 145.8/km^{2} (377.7/sq mi)
- Website: http://www.luzna.powiat.gorlice.pl

Gmina Łużna is a rural gmina (administrative district) in Gorlice County, Lesser Poland Voivodeship, in southern Poland. Łużna is located approximately 11 kilometres (7 mi) north-west of Gorlice and 89 km (55 mi) south-east of the regional capital Kraków.

The gmina covers an area of 56.24 square kilometres (21.7 sq mi), and as of 2006 its total population is 8,202.

== Villages ==
Gmina Łużna consists of the following villages: Biesna, Bieśnik, Łużna, Mszanka, Szalowa and Wola Łużańska.

== Neighbouring gminas ==
Gmina Łużna is surrounded by Bobowa, Gorlice, Grybów and Moszczenica.
