= Tyń =

- Village
- Location within Poland
- Coordinates: 54°27′35″N 16°44′12″E
- Country: Poland
- Voivodeship: West Pomeranian
- County: Sławno
- Gmina: Postomino

Tyń (Polish pronunciation: [tɨɲ]; German: Thyn) is a village in the administrative district of Gmina Postomino, within Sławno County, West Pomeranian Voivodeship, in north-western Poland. It lies approximately 5 km (3 mi) south of Postomino, 11 km (7 mi) north of Sławno, and 183 km (114 mi) north-east of the regional capital Szczecin.

For the history of the region, see History of Pomerania.

== Notable residents ==
- Oscar Krackow von Wickerode (1826-1871), painter
