= Łużna =

- Village
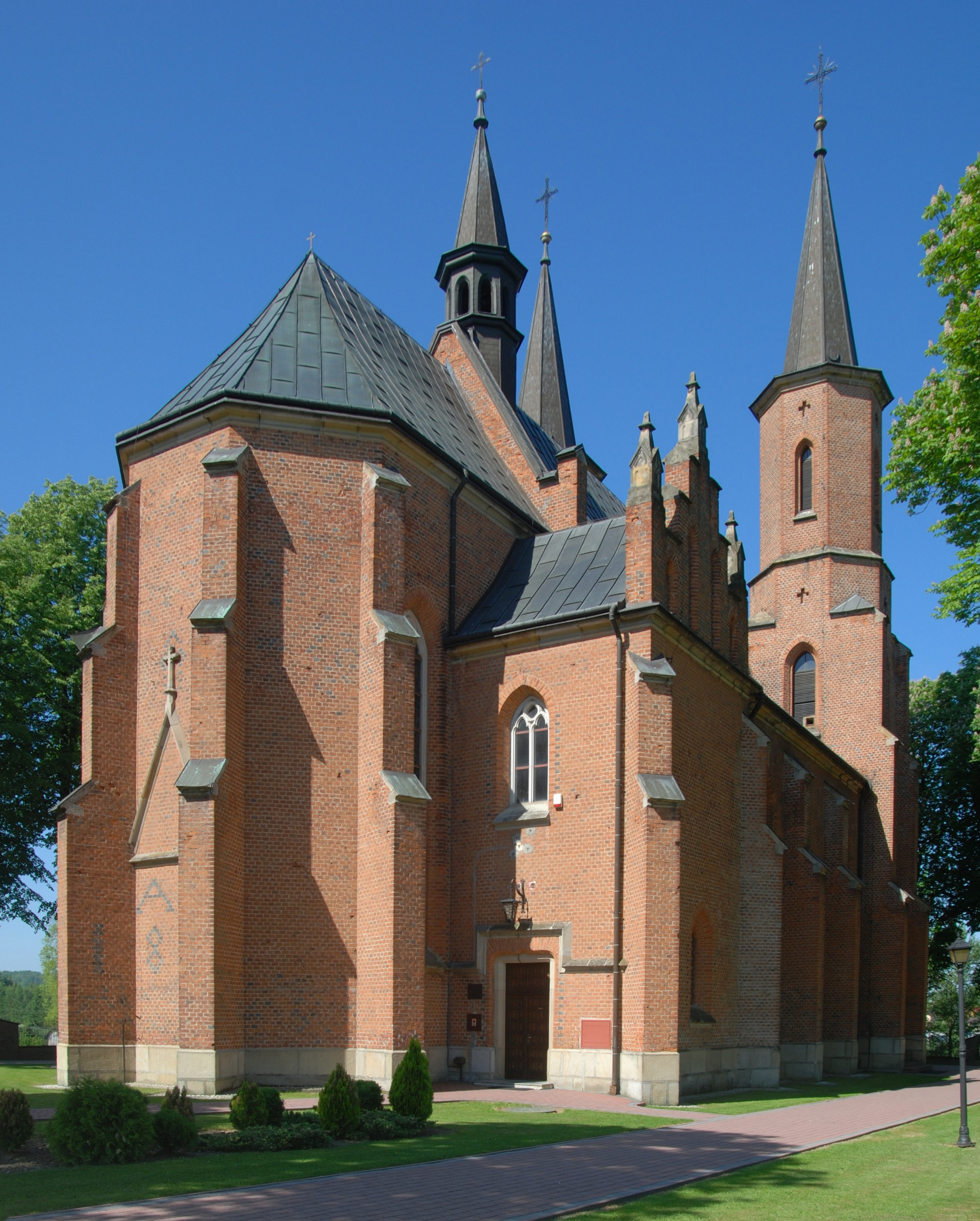
- Church of Saint Martin

- Location within Poland
- Coordinates: 49°42′45″N 21°3′2″E
- Country: Poland
- Voivodeship: Lesser Poland
- County: Gorlice
- Gmina: Łużna

Population
  - Total: 3,120

Łużna [ˈwuʐna] is a village in Gorlice County, Lesser Poland Voivodeship, in southern Poland. It is the seat of the gmina (administrative district) called Gmina Łużna.
