= Mszanka, Lesser Poland Voivodeship =

Mszanka
- Village
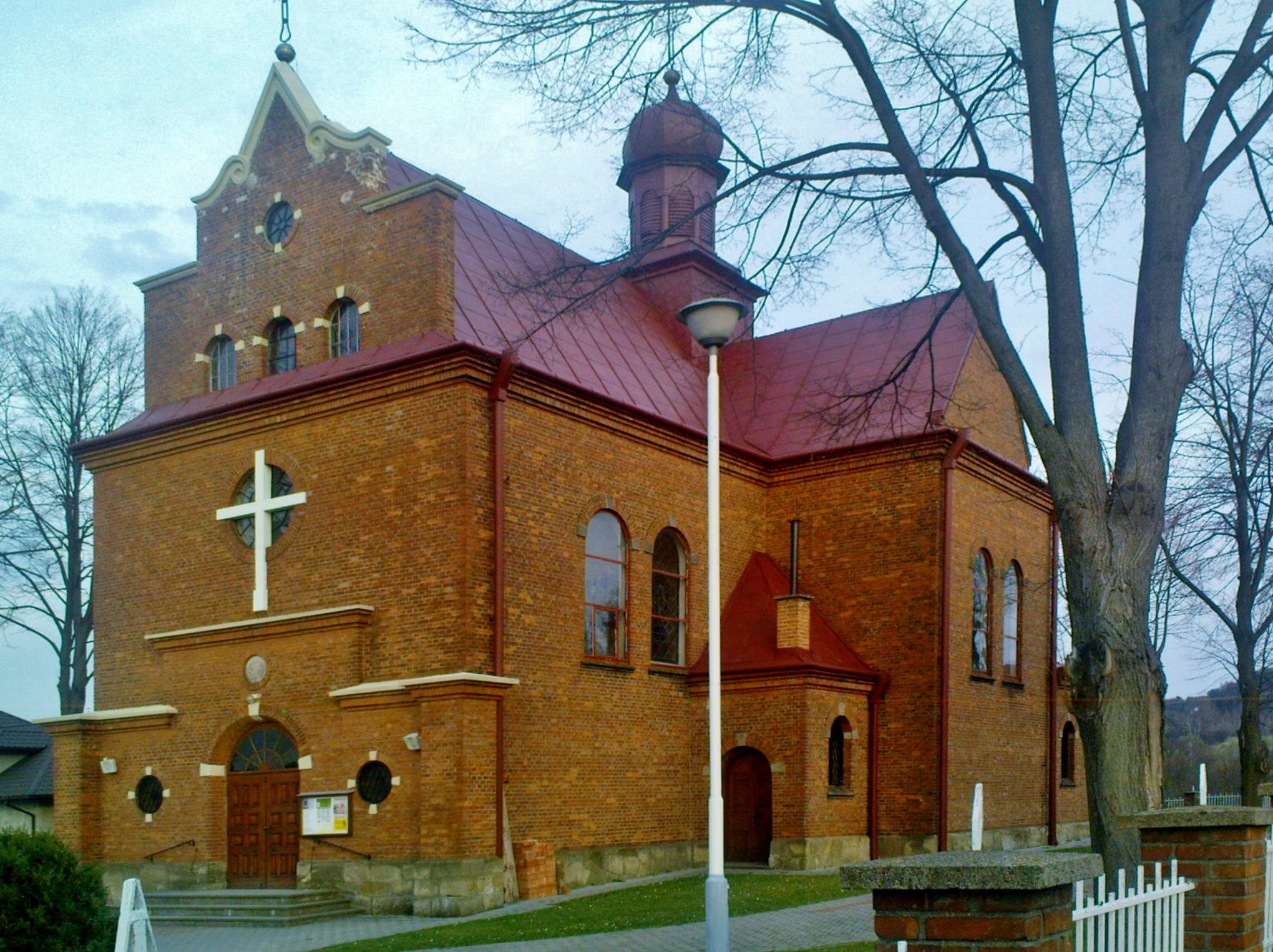
- Catholic church

- Location within Poland
- Coordinates: 49°41′N 21°5′E
- Country: Poland
- Voivodeship: Lesser Poland
- County: Gorlice
- Gmina: Łużna
- Population: 805

Mszanka [ˈmʂaŋka] is a village in the administrative district of Gmina Łużna, within Gorlice County, Lesser Poland Voivodeship, in southern Poland.
