= Gmina Postomino =

Gmina Postomino Postomino Commune
- Gmina
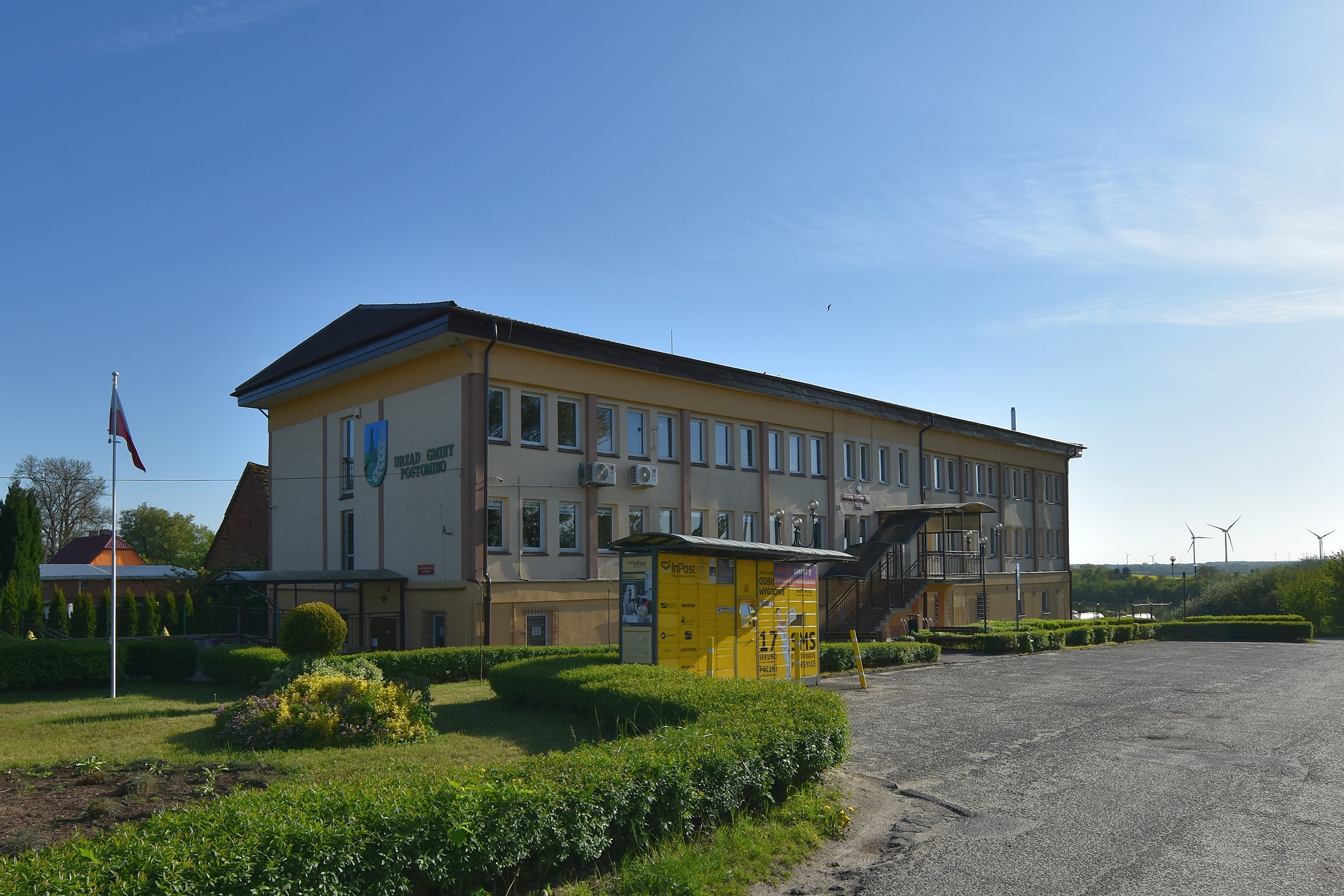

- Coat of arms

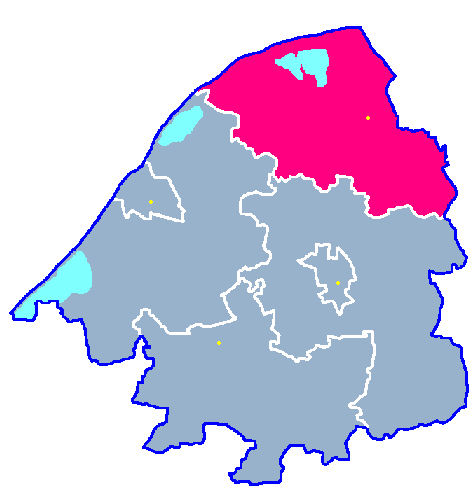
- Coordinates (Postomino): 54°29′44″N 16°42′54″E
- Country: Poland
- Voivodeship: West Pomeranian
- County: Sławno
- Seat: Postomino

Area
  - Total: 227.24 km^{2} (87.74 sq mi)

Population (2006)
  - Total: 6,973
  - Density: 30.69/km^{2} (79.48/sq mi)
- Website: http://www.postomino.pl/

Gmina Postomino is a rural gmina (administrative district) in Sławno County, West Pomeranian Voivodeship, in northwestern Poland. Its seat is the village of Postomino, which lies approximately 15 kilometres (9 mi) north of Sławno and 184 km (114 mi) northeast of the regional capital Szczecin.

The gmina covers an area of 227.24 square kilometres (87.7 sq mi), and as of 2006 its total population is 6,973.

== Villages ==
Gmina Postomino contains the villages and settlements of Bylica, Chełmno Słowieńskie, Chudaczewko, Chudaczewo, Czarna Buda, Dołek, Dzierżęcin, Górka, Górsko, Jarosławiec, Jezierzany, Kanin, Karsino, Kłośnik, Korlino, Królewice, Królewko, Królewo, Łącko, Łężek, Marszewo, Masłowice, Mazów, Mszane, Mszanka, Naćmierz, Nosalin, Nosalinek, Nowe Łącko, Pałówko, Pałowo, Pieńkówko, Pieńkowo, Pieszcz, Postomino, Przybudówka-Królewo, Radziszkowo, Ronino, Rusinowo, Staniewice, Tłuki, Tyń, Wicko Morskie, Wilkowice, Wszedzień, Wykroty and Złakowo.

== Neighbouring gminas ==
Gmina Postomino is bordered by the gminas of Darłowo, Kobylnica, Sławno, Słupsk and Ustka.
