= Postomino =

- Village
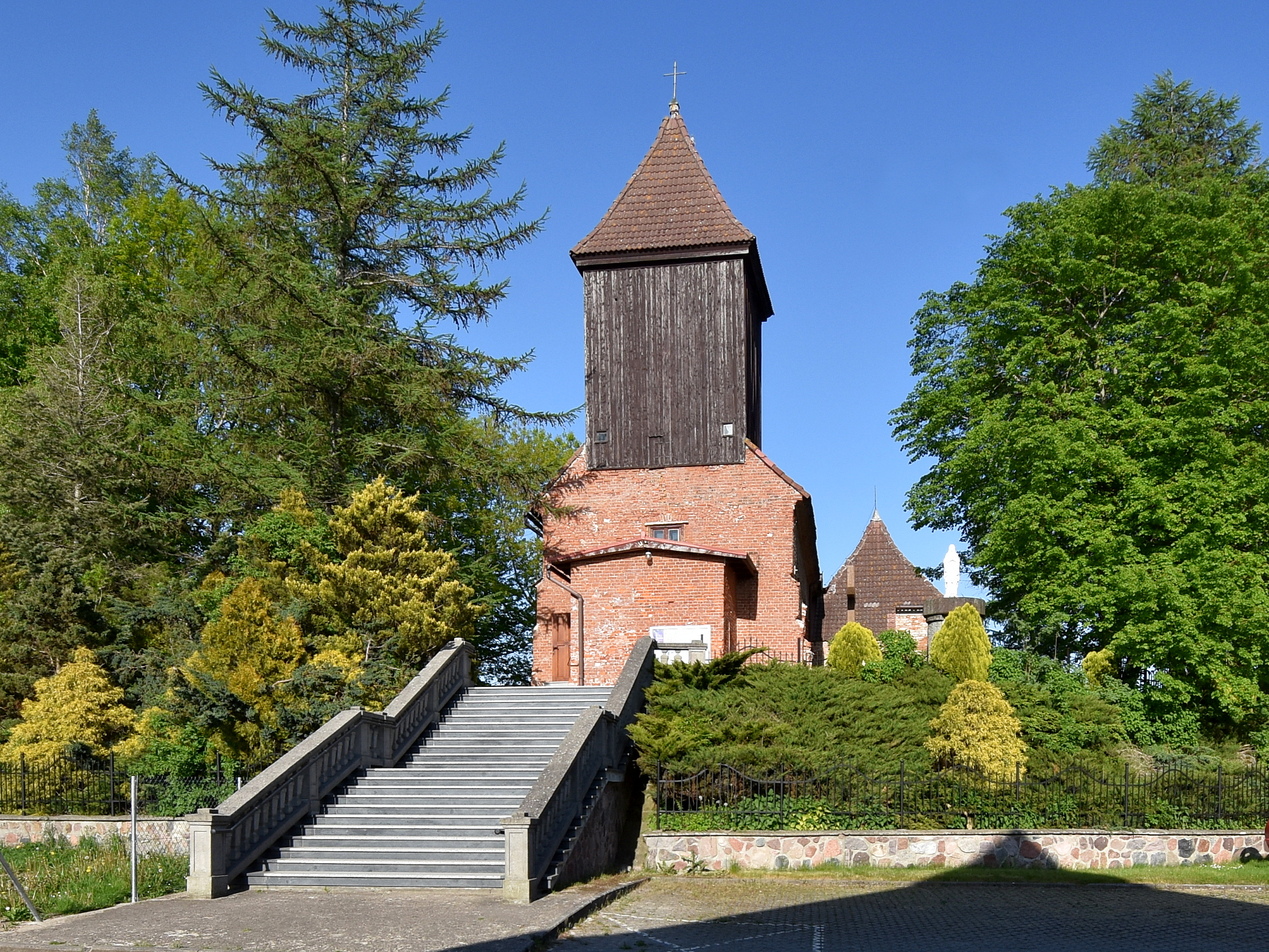
- Church of Saint Florian

- Location within Poland
- Coordinates: 54°29′44″N 16°42′54″E
- Country: Poland
- Voivodeship: West Pomeranian
- County: Sławno
- Gmina: Postomino

Population
  - Total: 625

Postomino (Polish pronunciation: [pɔstɔˈminɔ]; German: Pustamin) is a village in Sławno County, West Pomeranian Voivodeship, in north-western Poland. It is the seat of the gmina (administrative district) called Gmina Postomino. It lies approximately 15 km (9 mi) north of Sławno and 184 km (114 mi) north-east of the regional capital Szczecin.

For the history of the region, see History of Pomerania.

The village has a population of 625.
