= Bodaki =

Bodaki refers to the following places in Poland:

- Bodaki, Lesser Poland Voivodeship
- Bodaki, Podlaskie Voivodeship
