= Reichenberg =

Reichenberg may refer to:

== People ==
- Aleksander Reichenberg (1992-2024), Swedish-Norwegian professional ice hockey player
- Antoni Reichenberg (1825-1903), Polish priest, Jesuit, and artist
- David Reichenberg (1950-1987), American oboist
- Suzanne Reichenberg (1853-1924), French actress

== Places ==
- Reichenberg, the German name for Liberec, a city in the Czech Republic
- Reichenberg, Rhineland-Palatinate, a municipality in Rhineland-Palatinate, Germany
- Reichenberg, Bavaria, a municipality in Bavaria, Germany

== Other ==
- Fieseler Fi 103R (Reichenberg), a World War II German aircraft.
