= Gmina Sękowa =

Gmina Sękowa Sękowa Commune
- Gmina
- Coat of arms
- Interactive map of Gmina Sękowa
- Coordinates (Sękowa): 49°36′N 21°12′E
- Country: Poland
- Voivodeship: Lesser Poland
- County: Gorlice
- Seat: Sękowa

Area
  - Total: 194.75 km^{2} (75.19 sq mi)

Population (2006)
  - Total: 4,777
  - Density: 24.53/km^{2} (63.53/sq mi)
- Website: http://www.sekowa.powiat.gorlice.pl/

Gmina Sękowa is a rural gmina (administrative district) in Gorlice County, Lesser Poland Voivodeship, in southern Poland, on the Slovak border. Its seat is the village of Sękowa, which lies approximately 7 kilometres (4 mi) south-east of Gorlice and 105 km (65 mi) south-east of the regional capital Kraków.

The gmina covers an area of 194.75 square kilometres (75.2 sq mi), and as of 2006 its total population is 4,777.

== Villages ==
Gmina Sękowa contains the villages and settlements of Banica, Bartne, Bodaki, Czarne, Jasionka, Krzywa, Lipna, Małastów, Męcina Mała, Męcina Wielka, Nieznajowa, Owczary, Pętna, Radocyna, Ropica Górna, Sękowa, Siary, Wapienne and Wołowiec.

== Neighbouring gminas ==
Gmina Sękowa is bordered by the town of Gorlice and by the gminas of Dębowiec, Gorlice, Krempna, Lipinki, Osiek Jasielski and Uście Gorlickie. It also borders Slovakia.
