= Jasionka, Lesser Poland Voivodeship =

Jasionka
- Village
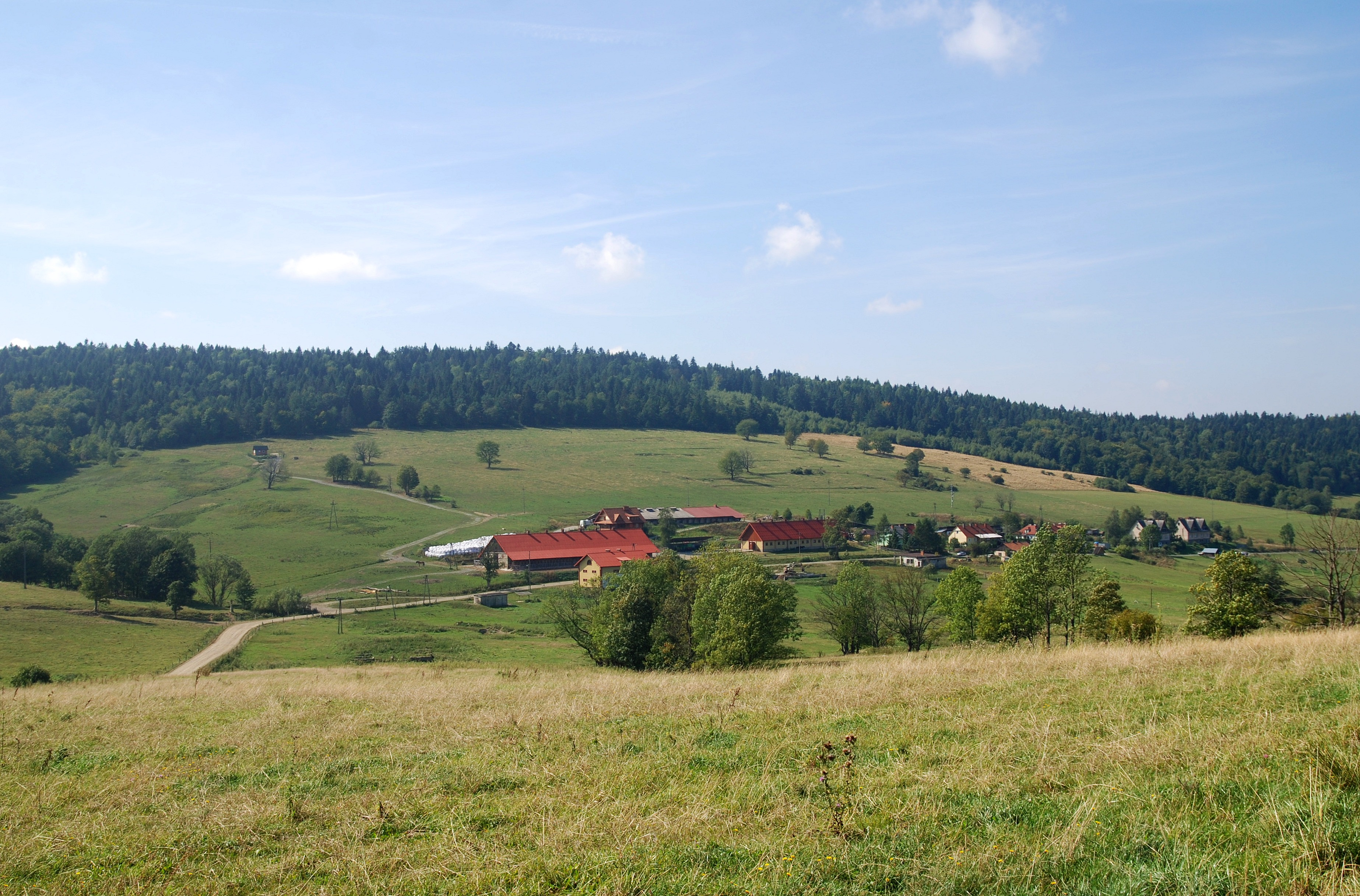

- Location within Poland
- Coordinates: 49°30′4″N 21°19′8″E
- Country: Poland
- Voivodeship: Lesser Poland
- County: Gorlice
- Gmina: Sękowa

Jasionka [jaˈɕɔŋka] (Note: Lemko Rusyn: Ясінка, romanized: Yasinka) is a village in the administrative district of Gmina Sękowa, within Gorlice County, Lesser Poland Voivodeship, in southern Poland, close to the border with Slovakia.
