= Krzywa, Lesser Poland Voivodeship =

Krzywa
- Village
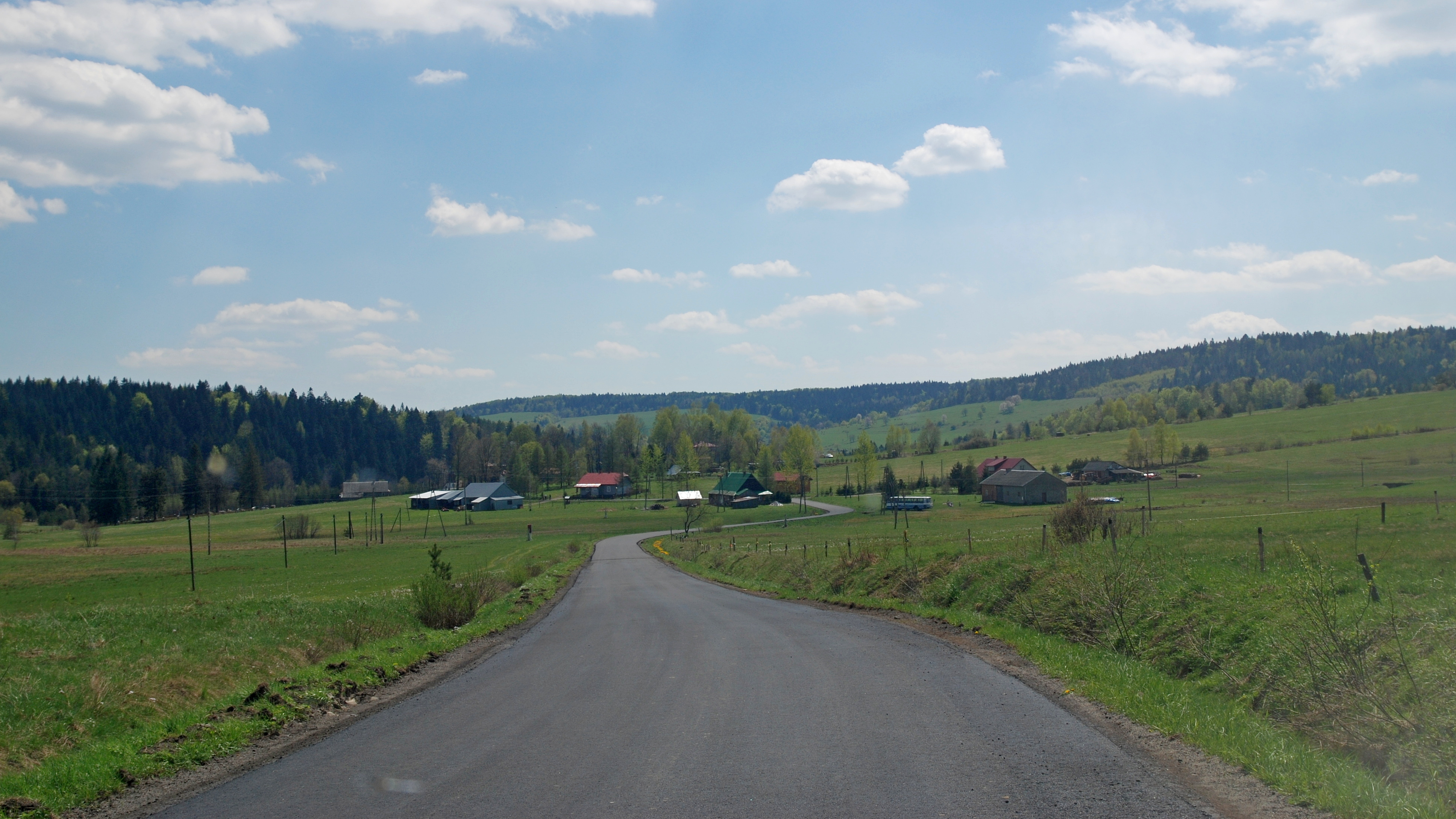

- Location within Poland
- Coordinates: 49°31′N 21°18′E
- Country: Poland
- Voivodeship: Lesser Poland
- County: Gorlice
- Gmina: Sękowa
- Population: 180

Krzywa [ˈkʂɨva] is a village in the administrative district of Gmina Sękowa, within Gorlice County, Lesser Poland Voivodeship, in southern Poland, close to the border with Slovakia.
