= Mirosław Nahacz =

Polish novelist and screenwriter (1984-2007)

- Born: September 9, 1984; Gladyszow, Poland
- Died: July 24, 2007 (aged 22); Warsaw, Poland
- Occupation: Author
- Writing career
- Notable works: Osiem cztery, Bombel, Bocian i Lola, Niezwykle przygody Roberta Robura

Mirosław Nahacz (September 9, 1984 - July 24, 2007) was a Polish novelist of Lemko ethnicity and screenwriter born in Gorlice. He majored in cultural studies at the University of Warsaw.

== Career ==
In 2003, at the age of eighteen, Nahacz published his first novel Osiem Cztery (Eight Four). That same year he wrote monthly a column to the Filipinka magazine and cooperated with the Lampa magazine, and was awarded the Natalia Gall and the Ryszard Pollak Literary Fund Award and moved to Warsaw. His next book, Bombel (2004), received critical acclaim, with critics calling him "a voice of the generation".

In 2005, Nahacz wrote Bocian and Lola (2005). His last book titled Niezwykłe przygody Roberta Robura (2009), was finished just days before his disappearance in July 2007.

Nahacz stated that his writing was influenced by the literature of Céline, Hrabal, Burroughs and Pynchon.

Nahacz was the co-author of the screenplay Egzamin z Życia ('The Exam of a Life') broadcast on channel TVP2 of the public Polish Television.

== Death ==
On July 24, 2007, at the age of 22, Nahacz was found dead in the basement of his Warsaw flat. He had disappeared and committed suicide by hanging a few days earlier.

== Works ==
- Osiem cztery (novel; Czarne 2003, ISBN 83-87391-75-1)
- Bombel (novel; Czarne 2004, ISBN 83-87391-94-8)
- Bocian i Lola (novel; Czarne 2005, ISBN 83-89755-31-9)
- Niezwykłe przygody Roberta Robura (novel; Warszawa: Prószyński, 2009; ISBN 978-83-7648-016-9
