= Męcina Wielka =

- Village
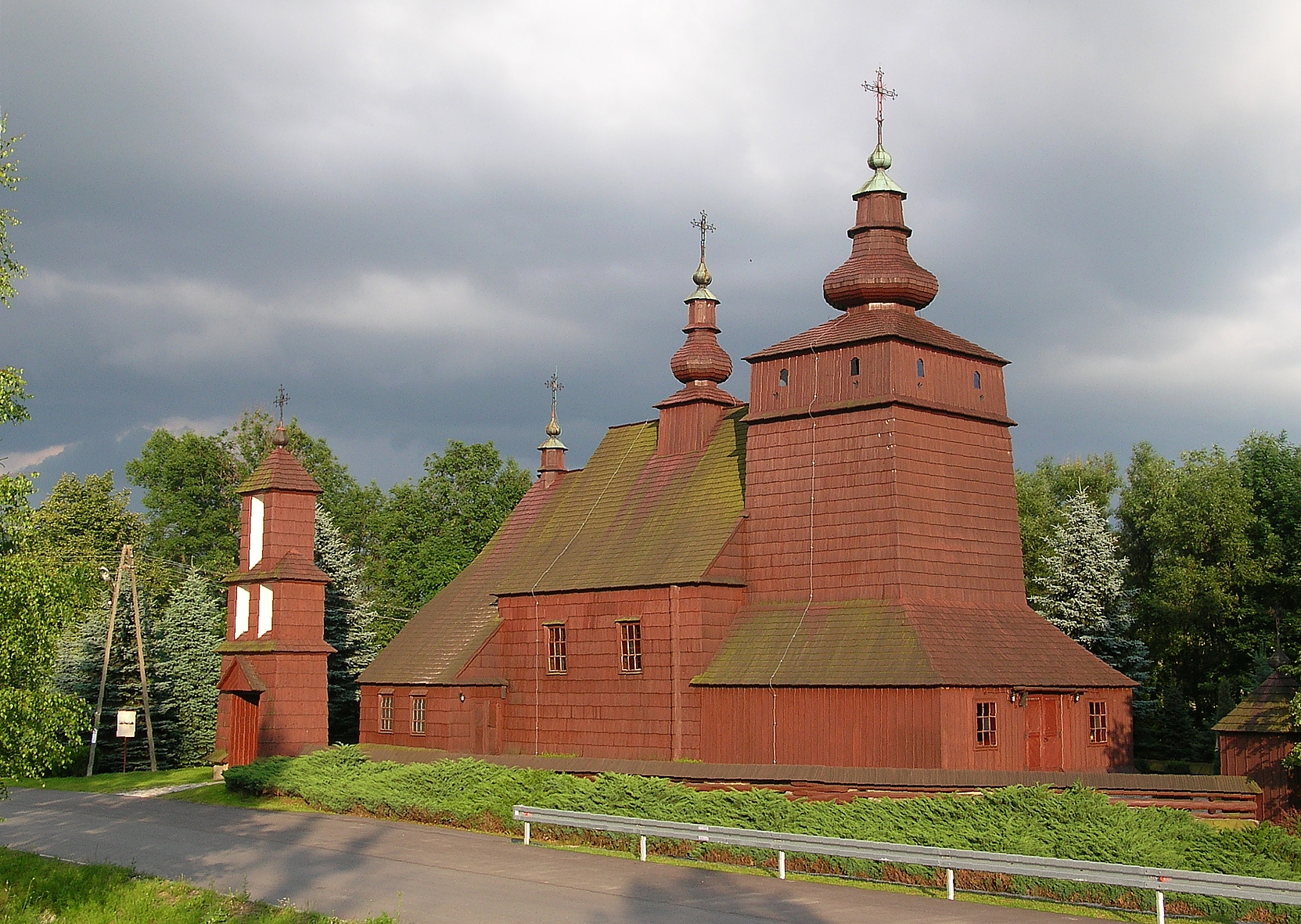
- Wooden church in Męcina Wielka

- Location within Poland
- Coordinates: 49°38′N 21°16′E
- Country: Poland
- Voivodeship: Lesser Poland
- County: Gorlice
- Gmina: Sękowa
- Population: 420

Męcina Wielka [mɛnˈt͡ɕina ˈvʲɛlka] is a village in the administrative district of Gmina Sękowa, within Gorlice County, Lesser Poland Voivodeship, in southern Poland, close to the border with Slovakia.
