= Lipna, Lesser Poland Voivodeship =

Lipna
- Village
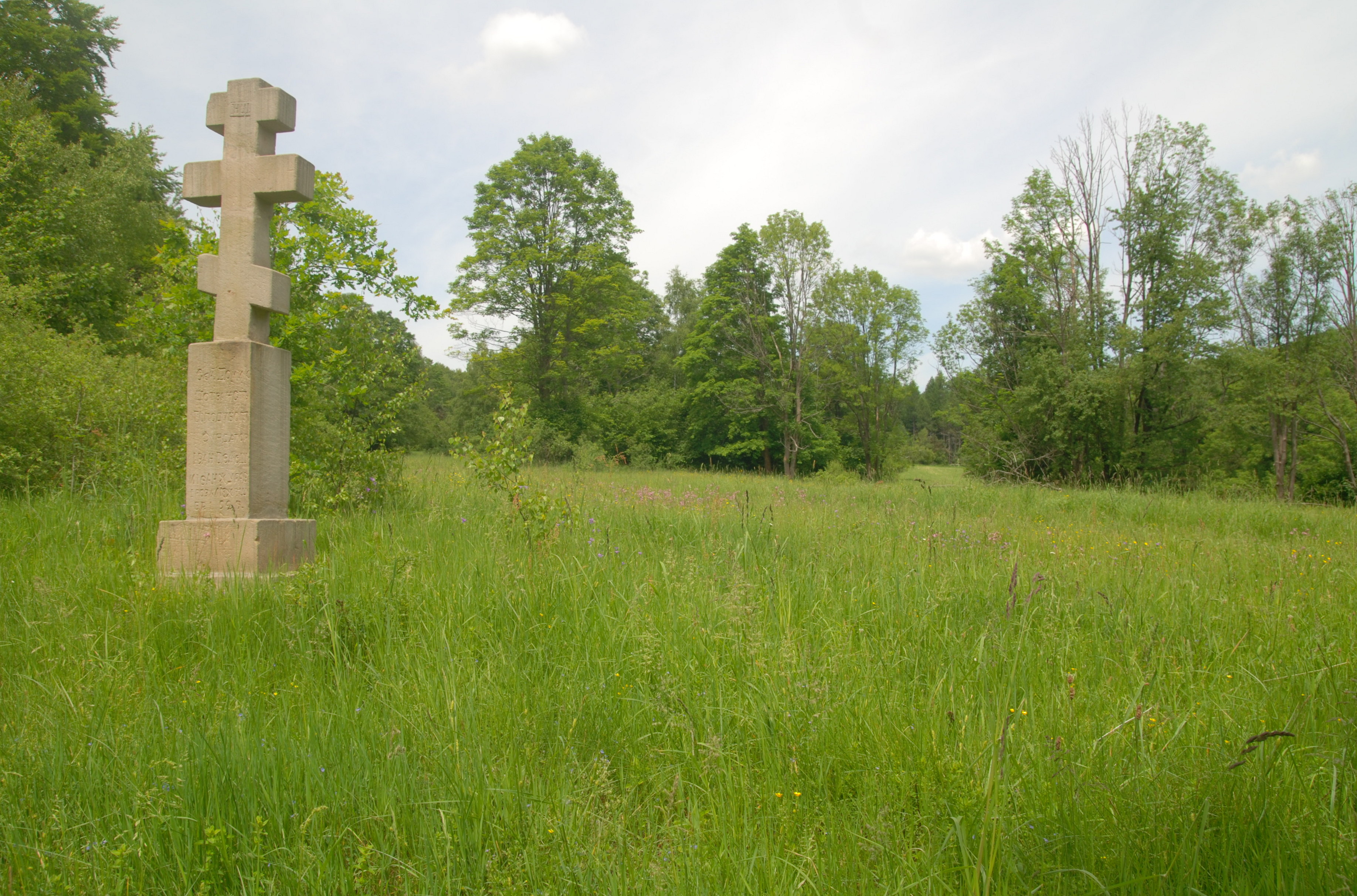

- Location within Poland
- Coordinates: 49°28′N 21°21′E
- Country: Poland
- Voivodeship: Lesser Poland
- County: Gorlice
- Gmina: Sękowa

Lipna (Polish: [ˈlipna]; Ukrainian: Липна, romanized: Lypna) is a village in the administrative district of Gmina Sękowa, within Gorlice County, Lesser Poland Voivodeship, in southern Poland, close to the border with Slovakia.
