= Robert Drąg =

Polish footballer

Personal information
- Full name: Robert Drąg
- Date of birth: 25 October 1983 (age 43)
- Place of birth: Gorlice, Poland
- Height: 1.77 m (5 ft 9 1/2 in)
- Position: Midfielder

Youth career
- LKS Uście Gorlickie

Senior career*
Years	Team	Apps	(Gls)
2001	LKS Kobylanka		
2002	Glinik/Karpatia Gorlice		
2003–2004	LKS Kobylanka		
2005	Górnik Zabrze	7	(0)
2005	Gawin Królewska Wola		
2006–2010	Kolejarz Stróże	78	(9)
2010	→ Karpaty Krosno (loan)	15	(3)
2011	Poprad Muszyna	14	(2)
2012	LKS Kobylanka		
2012–2014	Poroniec Poronin		
2014	Tuchovia Tuchów		
- * Club domestic league appearances and goals

Robert Drąg (born 25 October 1983) is a Polish former professional footballer who played as a midfielder.

== Career ==
=== Club ===
In January 2011, he joined Poprad Muszyna.
