= Nieznajowa =

- Village
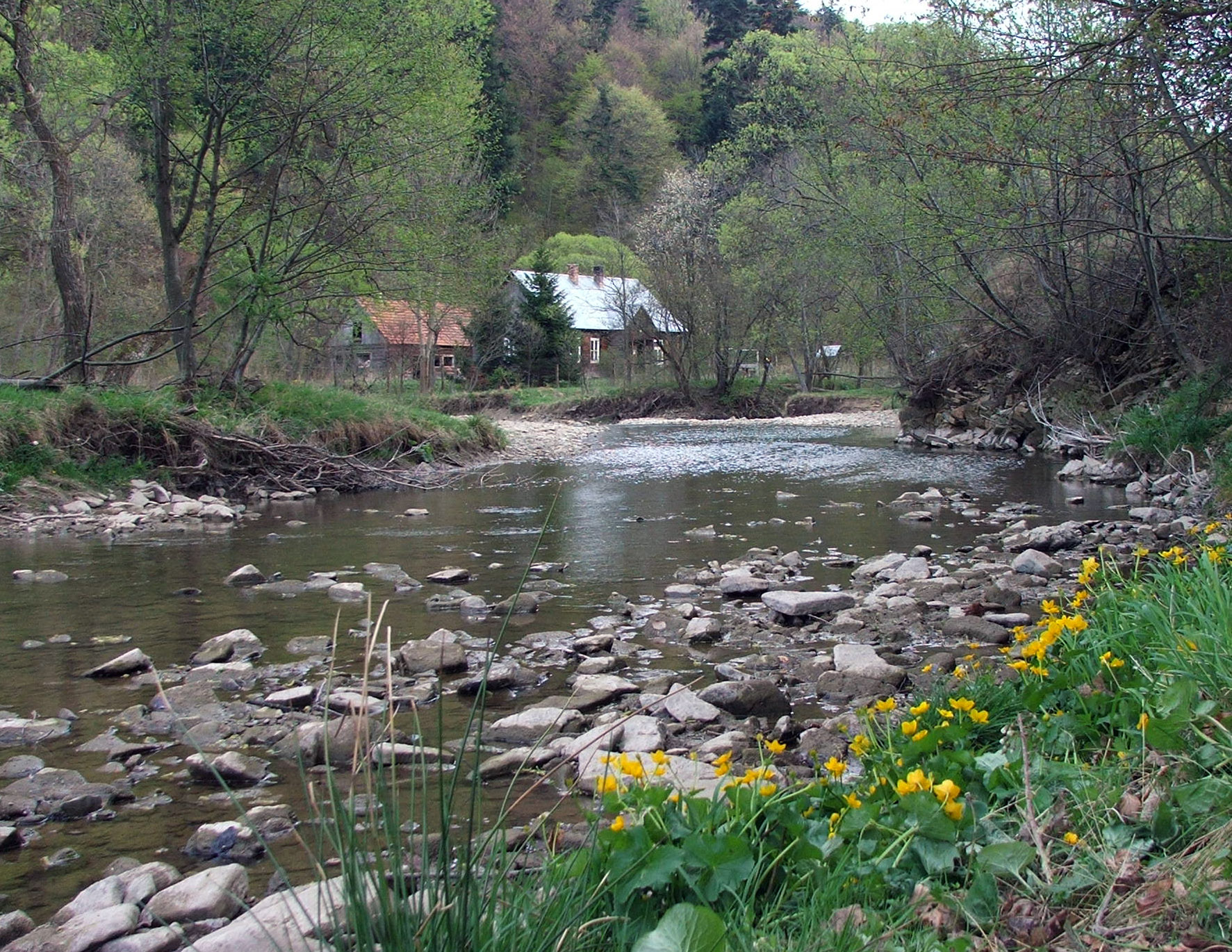

- Location within Poland
- Coordinates: 49°29′27″N 21°23′29″E
- Country: Poland
- Voivodeship: Lesser Poland
- County: Gorlice
- Gmina: Sękowa

Nieznajowa [ɲɛznaˈjɔva] (Note: Lemko Rusyn: Незнайова, Незнаєва, romanized: Neznayova, Neznayeva) is a depopulated village in the administrative district of Gmina Sękowa, within Gorlice County, Lesser Poland Voivodeship, in southern Poland, close to the border with Slovakia.

The village was founded in 1546 under the Vlach law. Nieznajowa was populated predominantly by Lemkos, who were deported to Ukraine in 1945-47 during common Soviet-Polish Operation Vistula. In the village remain Lemko cemetery, some roadside crosses and figures, some ruins of old buildings.

== Gallery ==
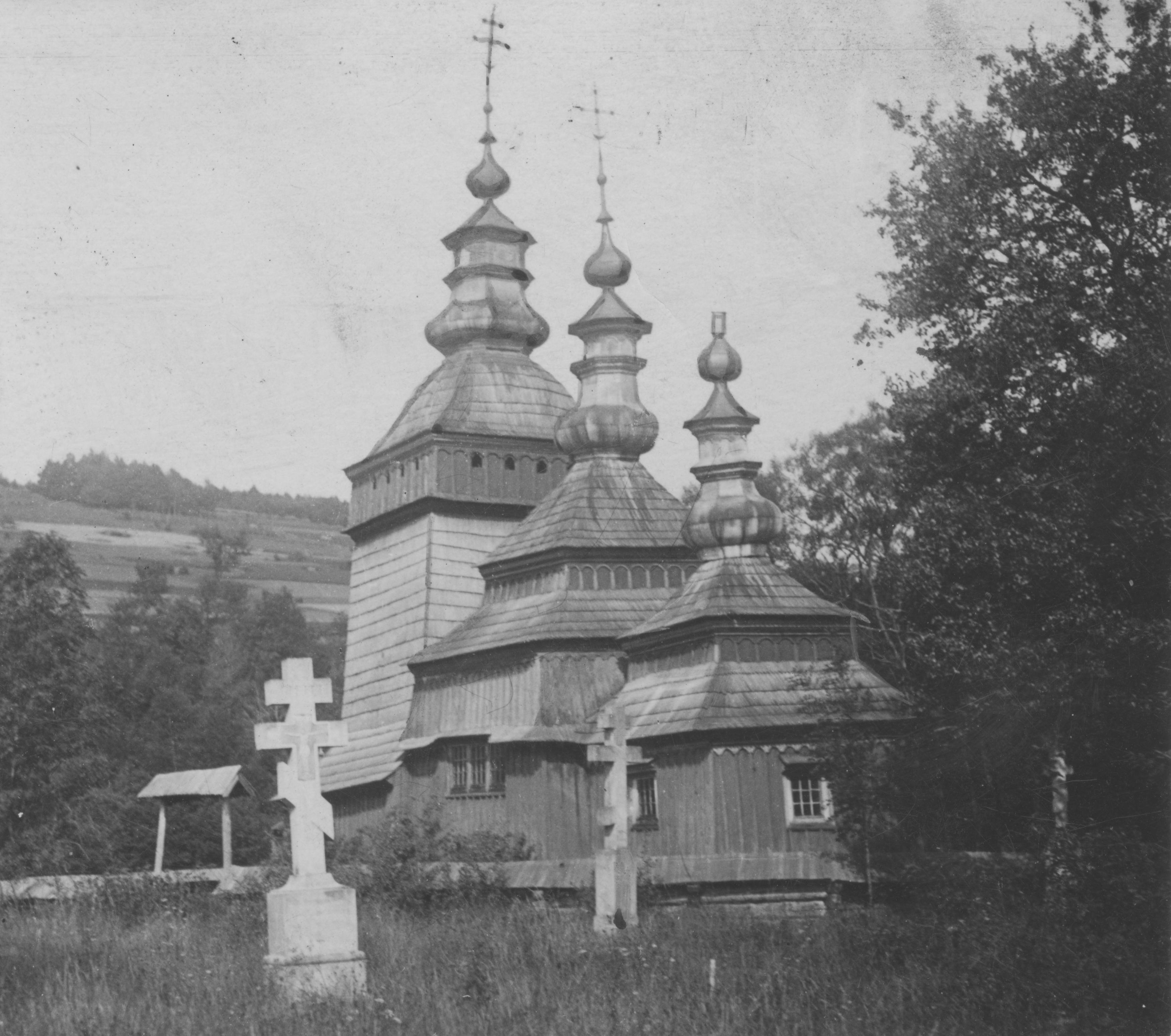
Church in Neznajova / Nieznajowa, around 1925 - 1933. Orthodox graves on the foreground.

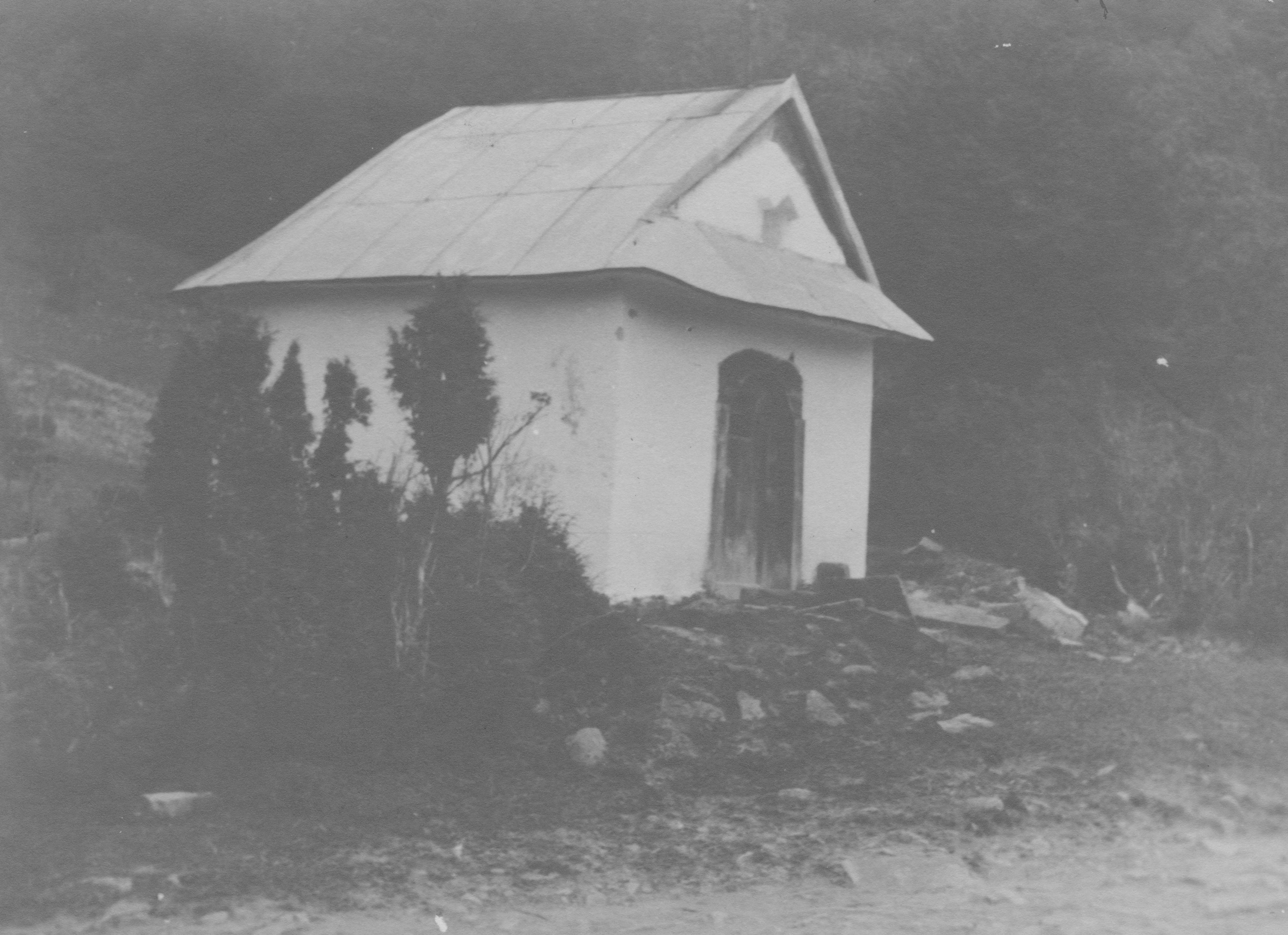
Roadside chapel in Neznajova / Nieznajowa (around 1918 - 1939)

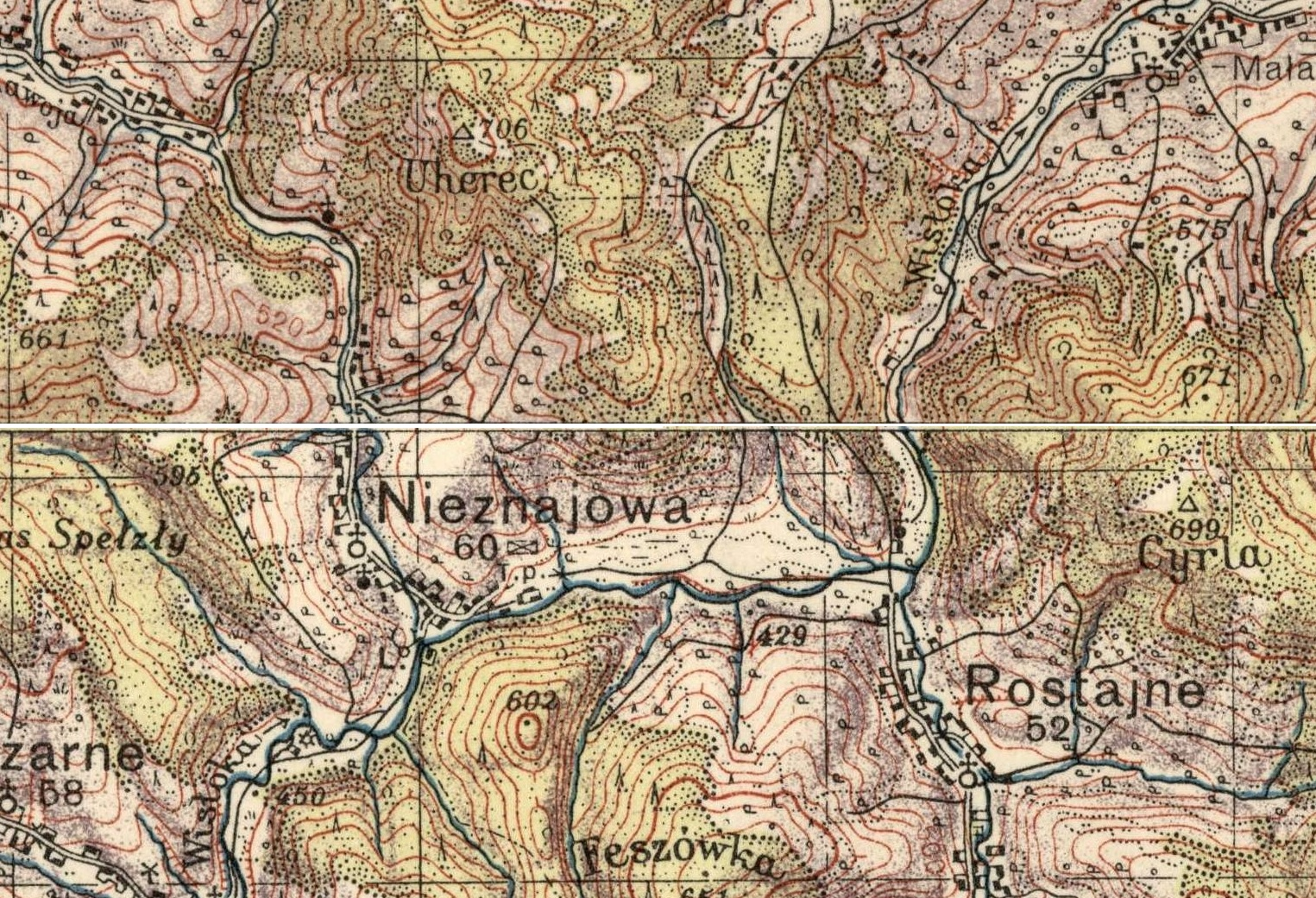
Nieznajowa on a Polish map of 1938

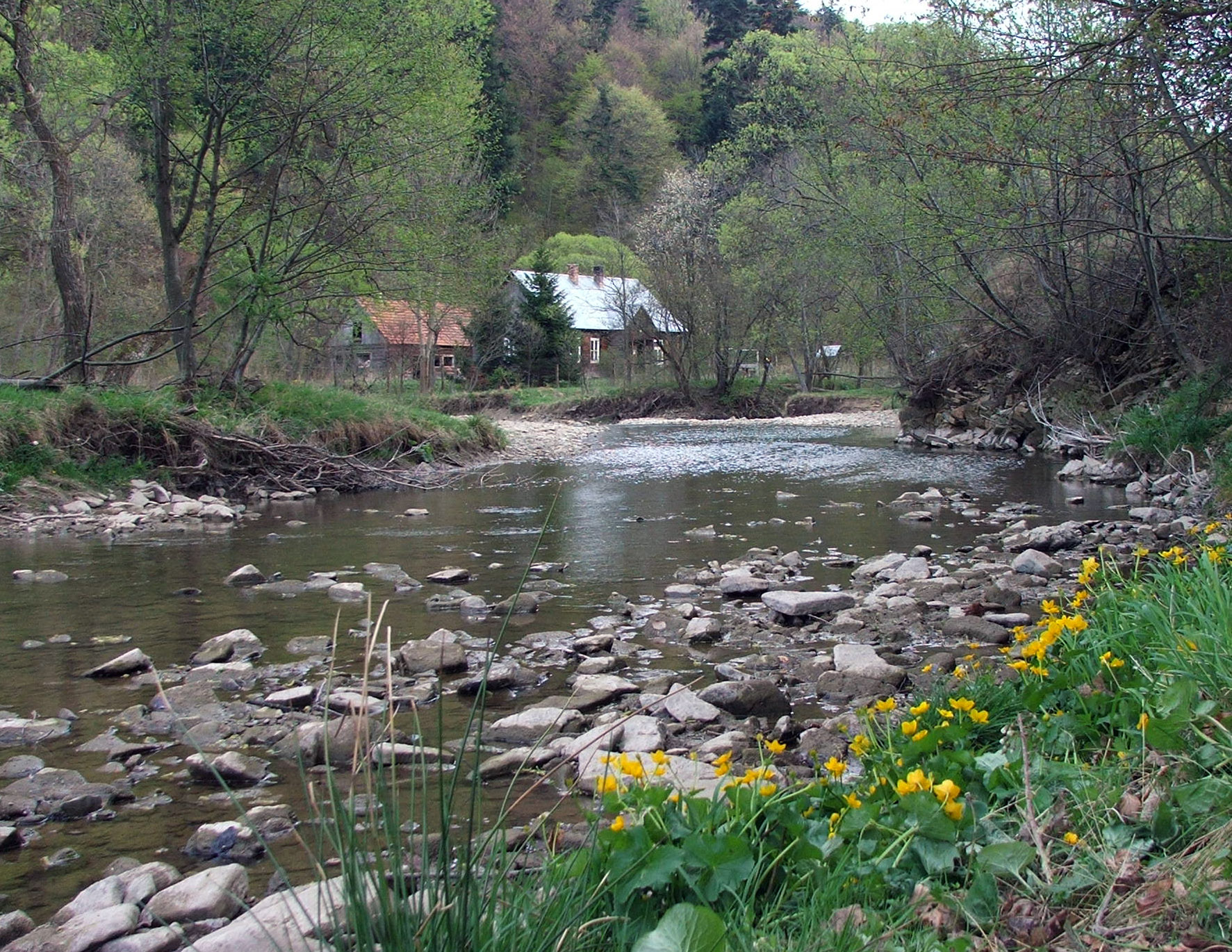
Modern student house in Nieznajowa

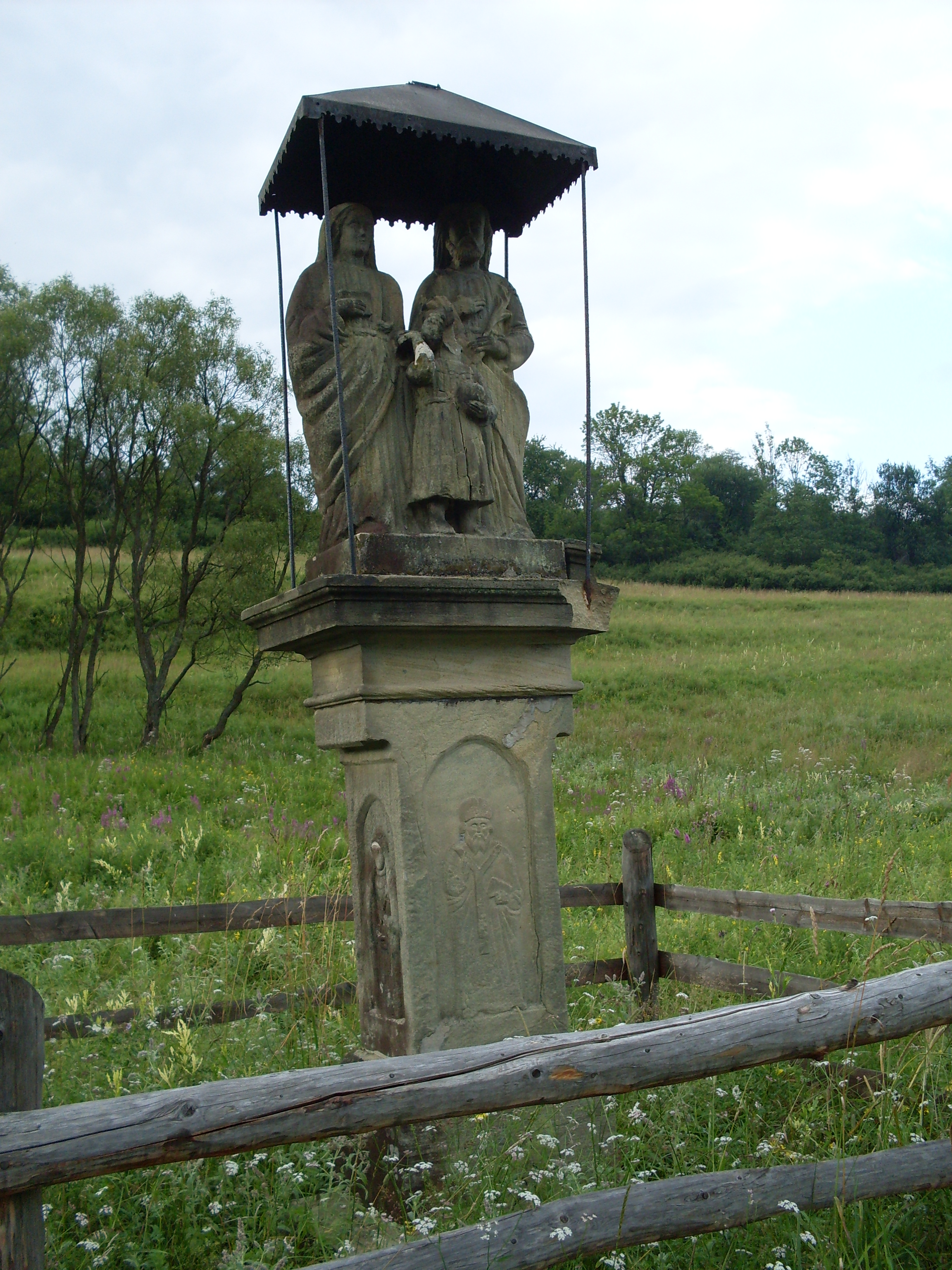
Lemko roadside figure of Holy Family

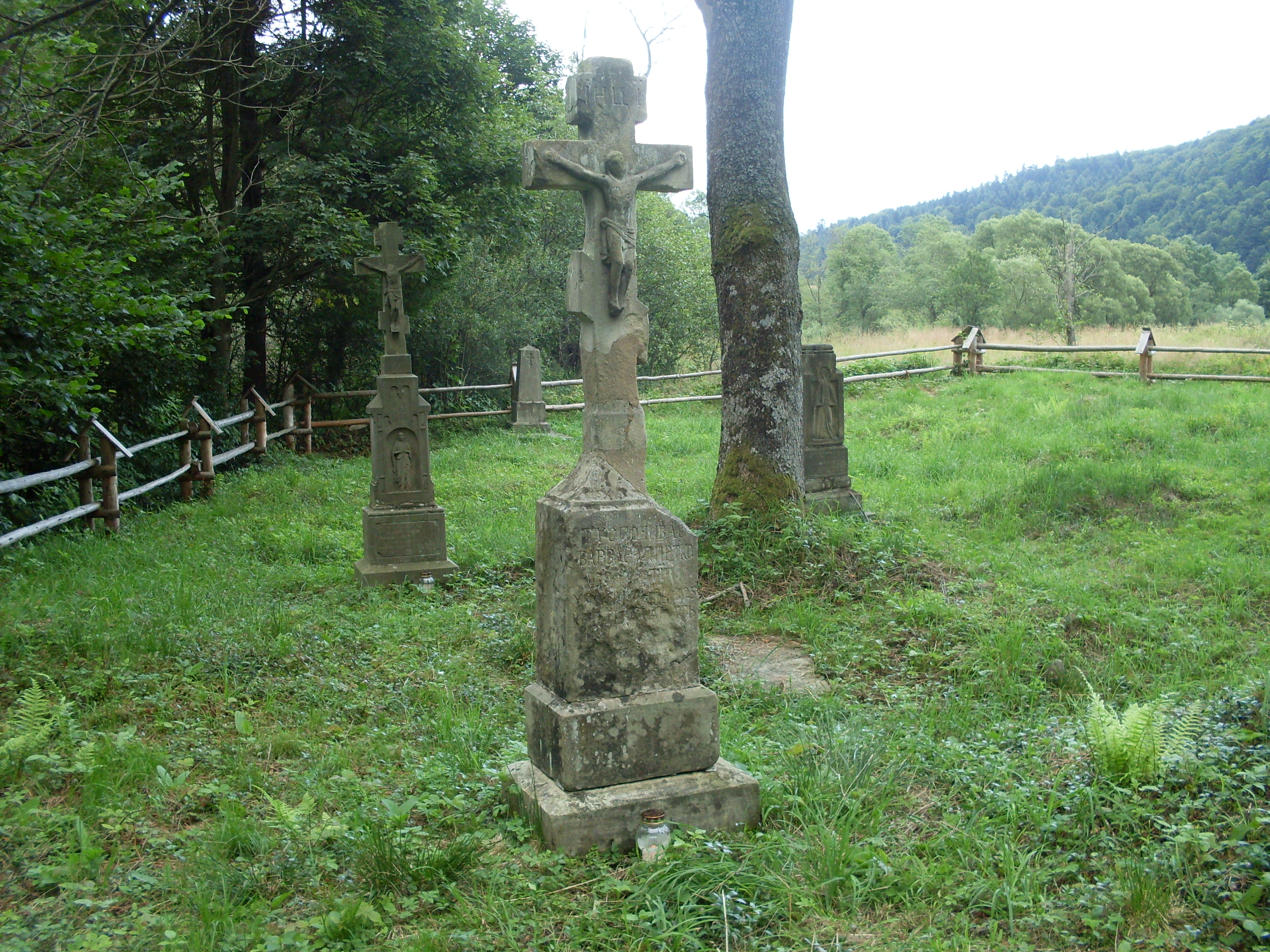
Lemko cemetery

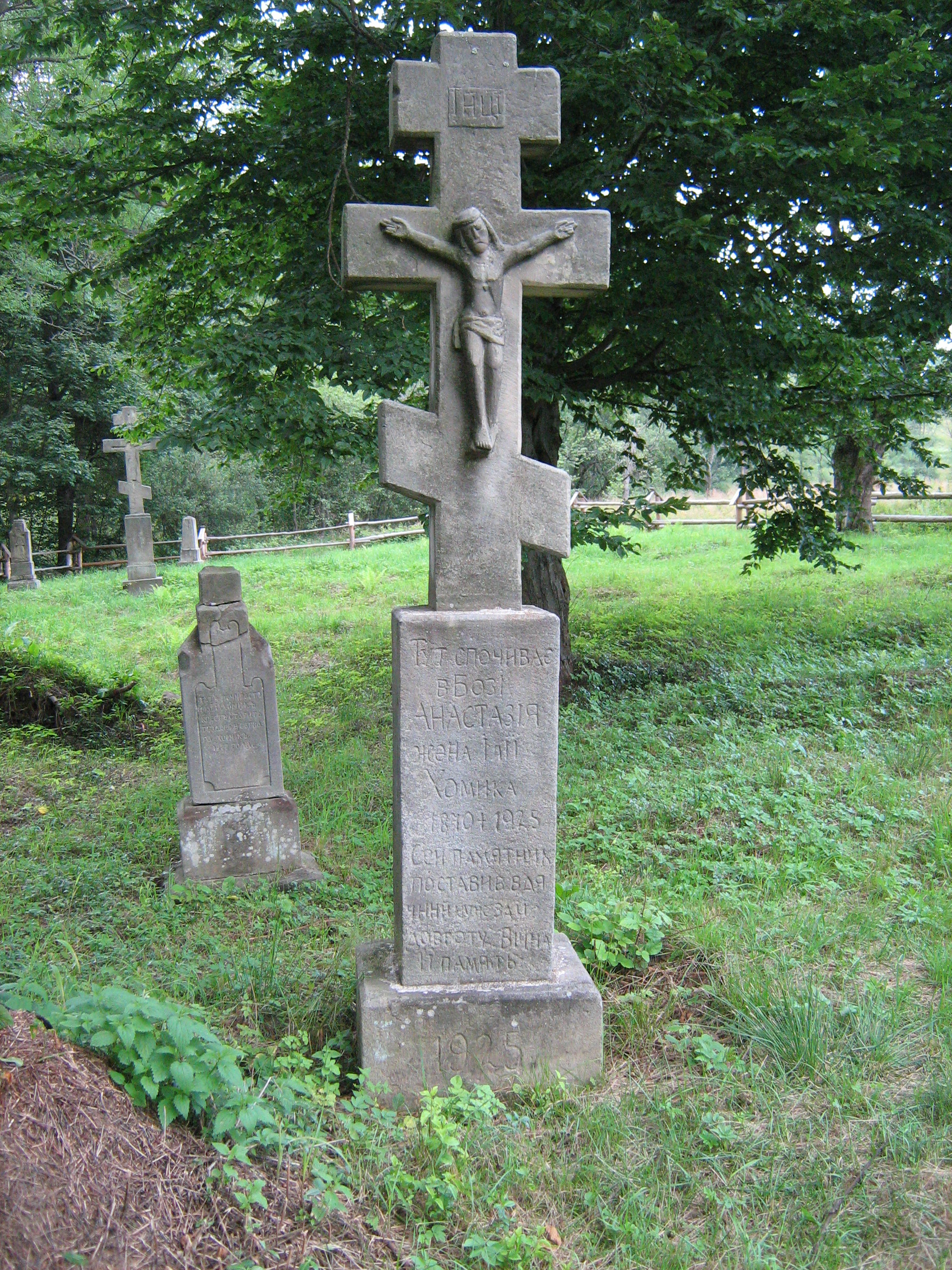
Lemko cemetery

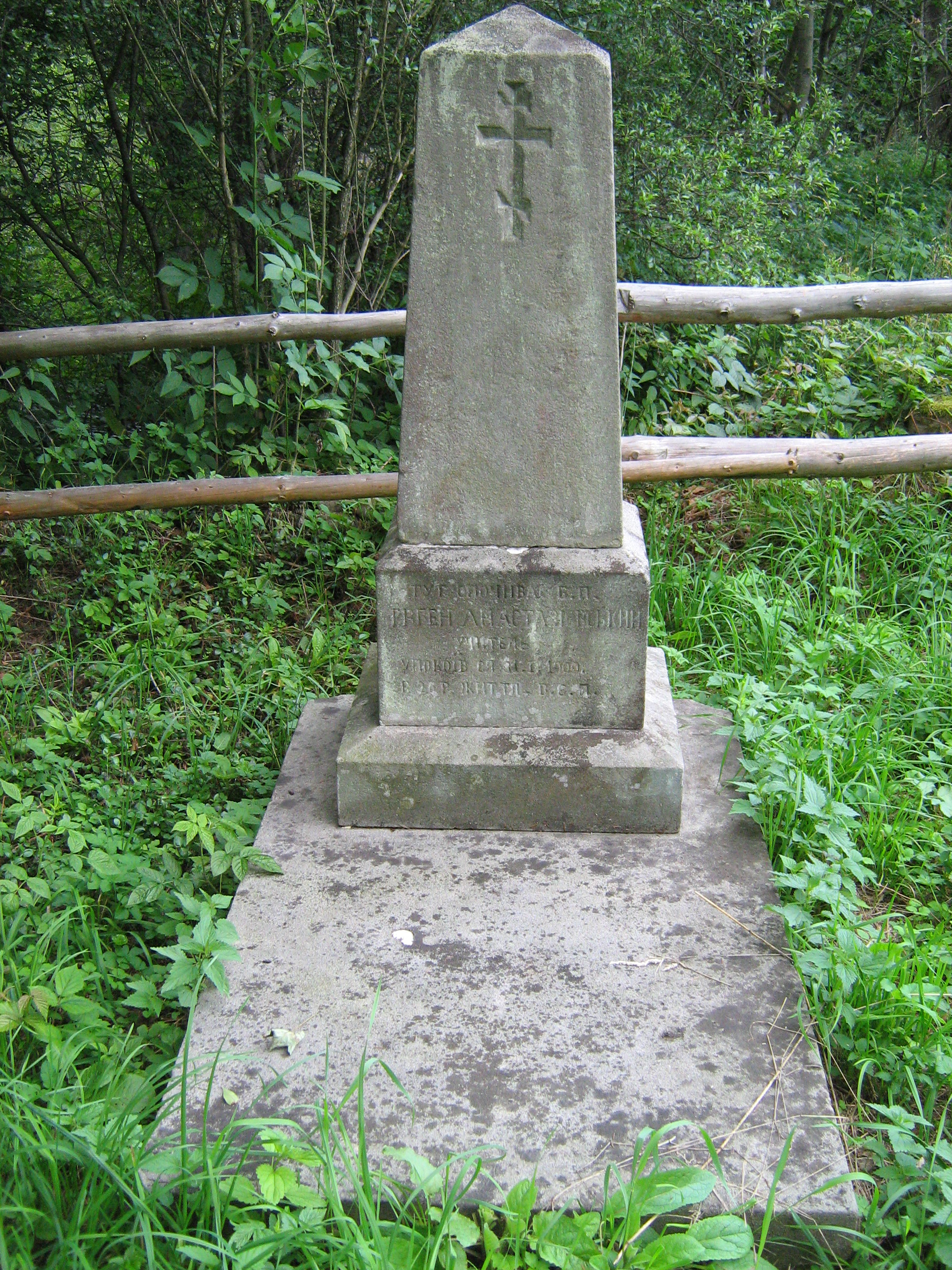
Lemko cemetery

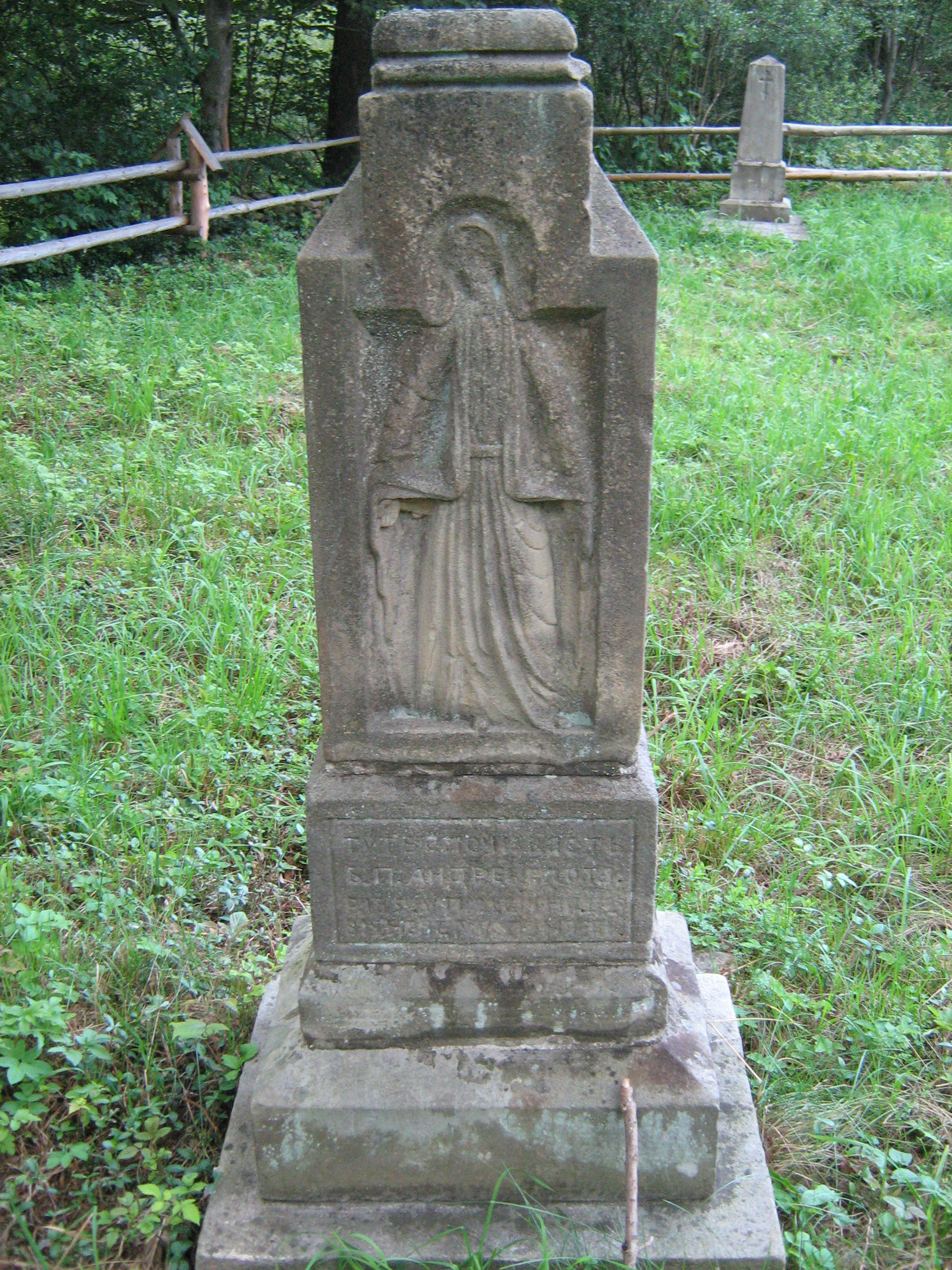
Lemko cemetery

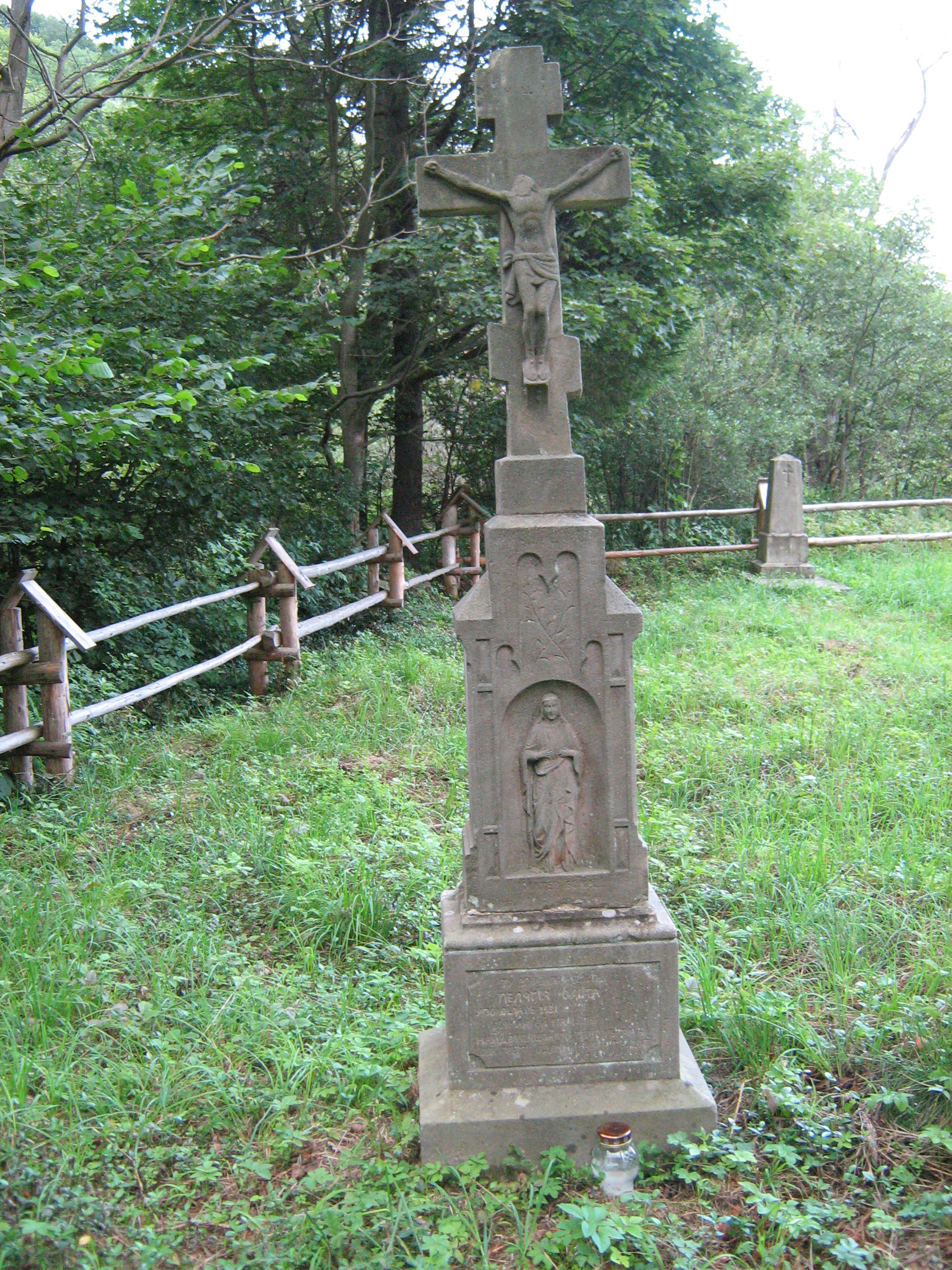
Lemko cemetery

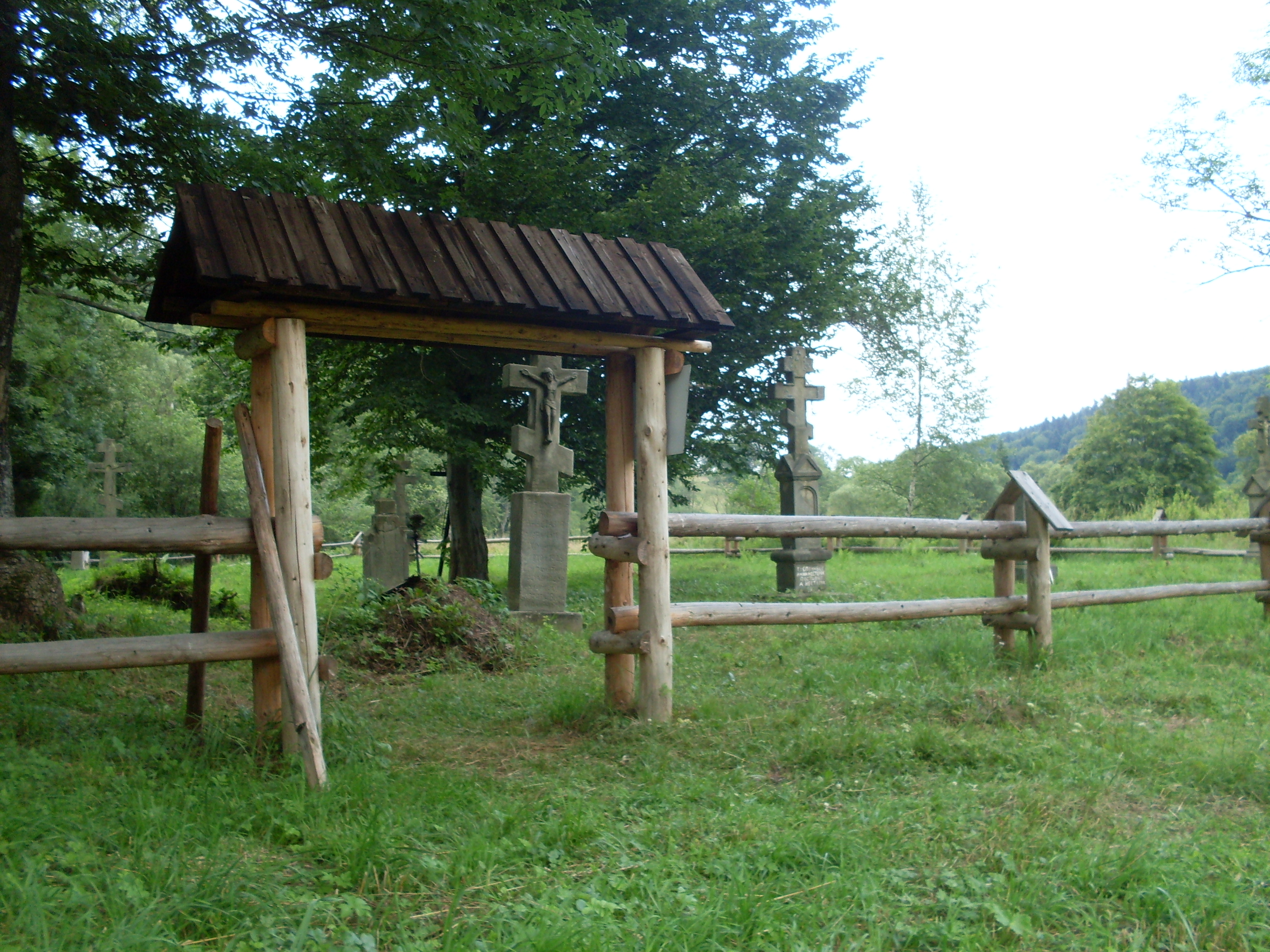
Lemko cemetery
