= Gorlice =

Municipality in Lesser Poland Voivodeship, Poland

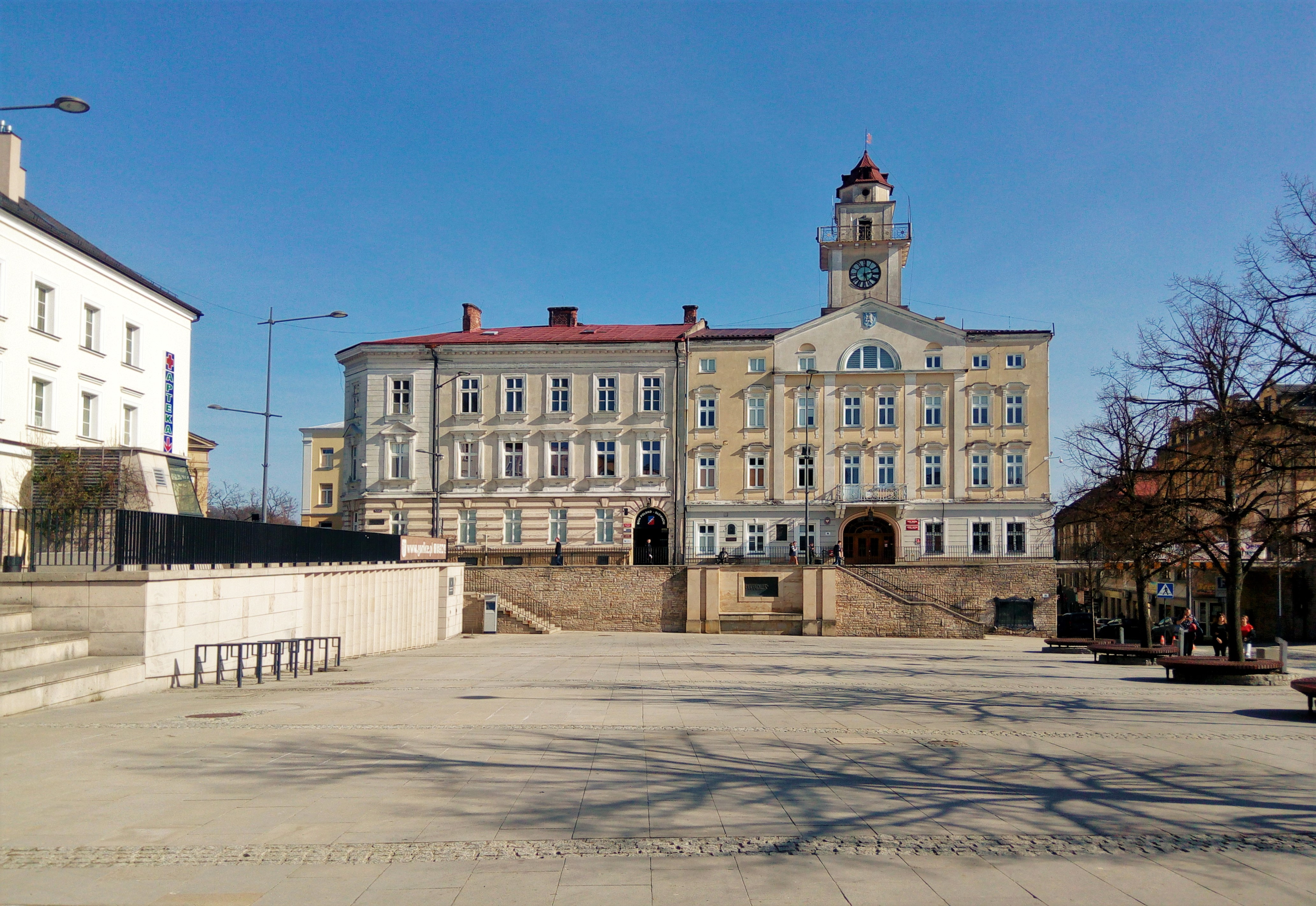
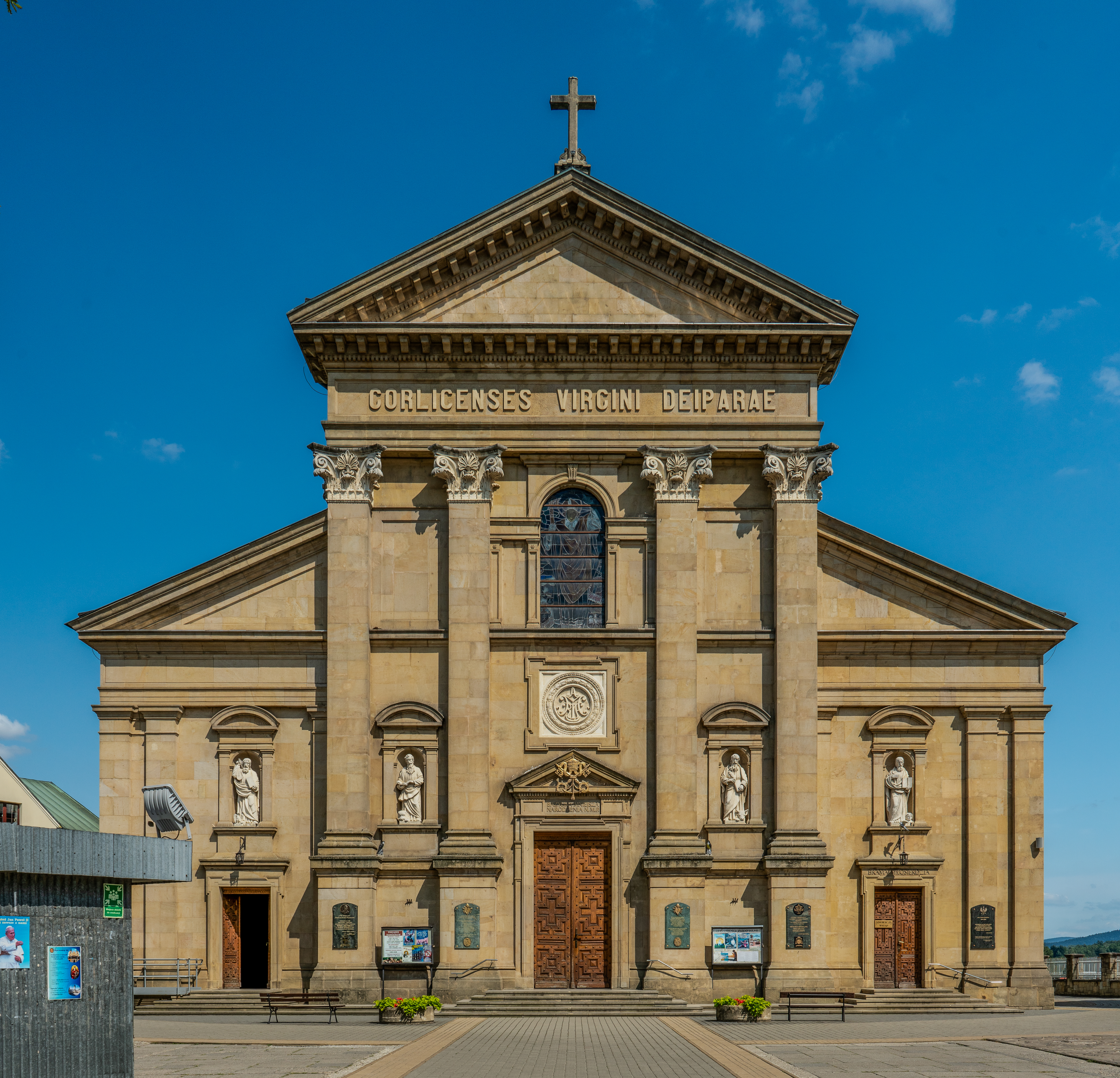
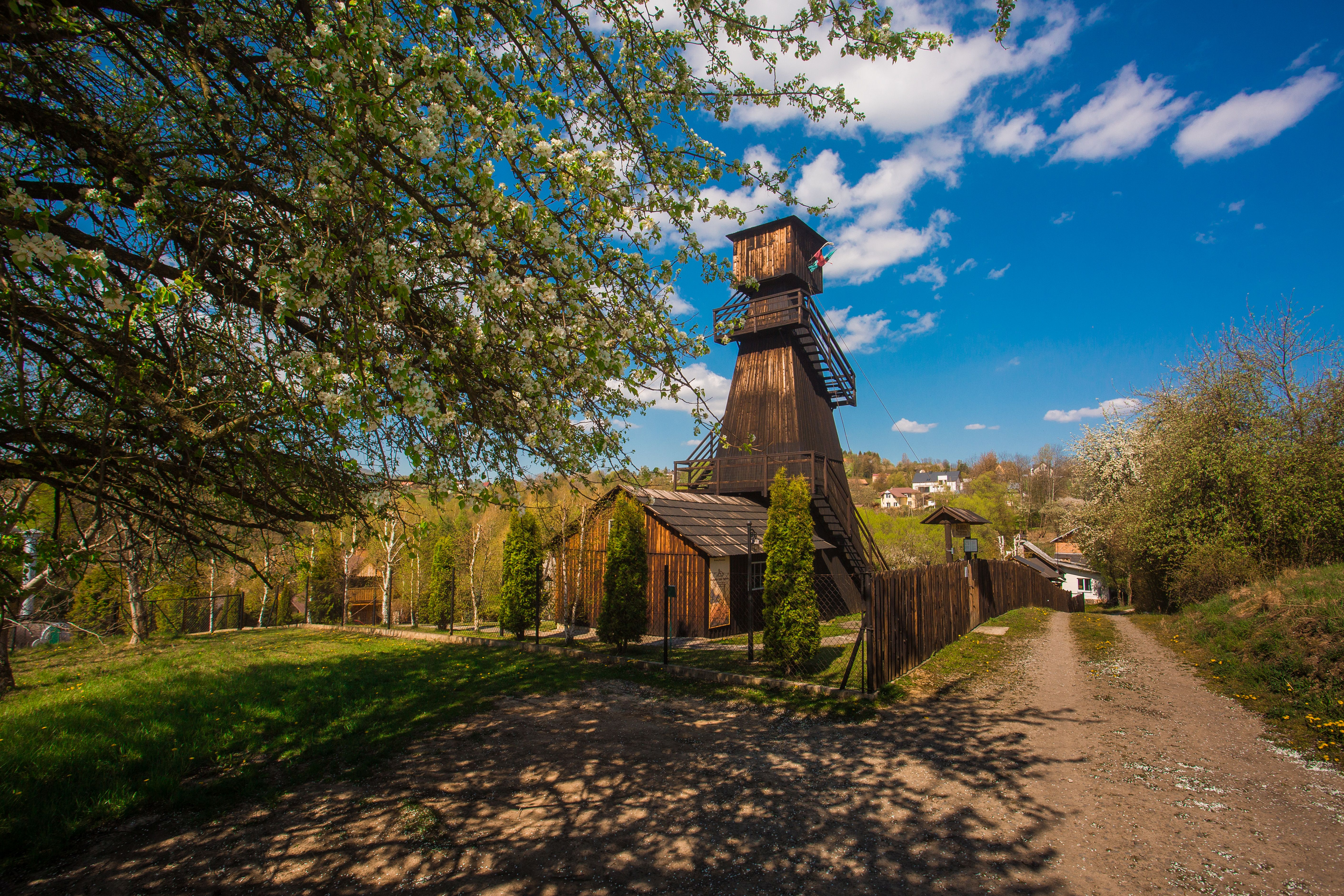
- From top, left to right: Town Hall and Market Square; Church of the Nativity of the Virgin Mary; Open Air Museum of Oil Industry Magdalena

- Flag Coat of arms

- Location within Poland
- Coordinates: 49°39′17″N 21°9′35″E
- Country: Poland
- Voivodeship: Lesser Poland
- County: Gorlice
- Gmina: Gorlice (urban gmina)

Government
  - Mayor: Rafał Kukla (NL)

Area
  - Total: 23.56 km^{2} (9.10 sq mi)

Population (2025)
  - Total: 24 825
  - Density: 1.0/km^{2} (2.6/sq mi)
- Time zone: UTC+1 (CET)
  - Summer (DST): UTC+2 (CEST)
- Postal code: 38–300 and 38–320
- Car plates: KGR
- Website: http://www.gorlice.pl

Gorlice (pronounced [ɡɔrˈlʲit͡sɛ]) is a town and an urban municipality in the Lesser Poland Voivodeship within the south-eastern Poland with around 24,825 inhabitants (2025). It is the capital of Gorlice County.

== History ==
Gorlice was founded during the reign of Casimir the Great in 1354. In that year, the Stolnik of Sandomierz, Derslaw Karwacjan, received royal permission to found a town in a densely forested area of the Carpathian foothills. The existence of the town is mentioned in sources from 1388, 1404 and 1417. In the 15th century, Gorlice remained private property of the Karwacjan family.

The town quickly developed, becoming a regional center of crafts and trade. In 1504, Jan Karwacjan received royal permission for two fairs annually and a weekly market. During the Polish Golden Age, Gorlice prospered. Its artisans and merchants had contacts not only with other Polish towns, but also with merchants from Upper Hungary. In the second half of the 16th century, Gorlice became property of the Odrowąż family, which supported Protestant Reformation. Swedish invasion of Poland (1655–60) brought widespread destruction: the population of Gorlice fell from 1200 (in 1657) to only 284 (in 1662).

=== Age of Partitions and first kerosene lamp ===
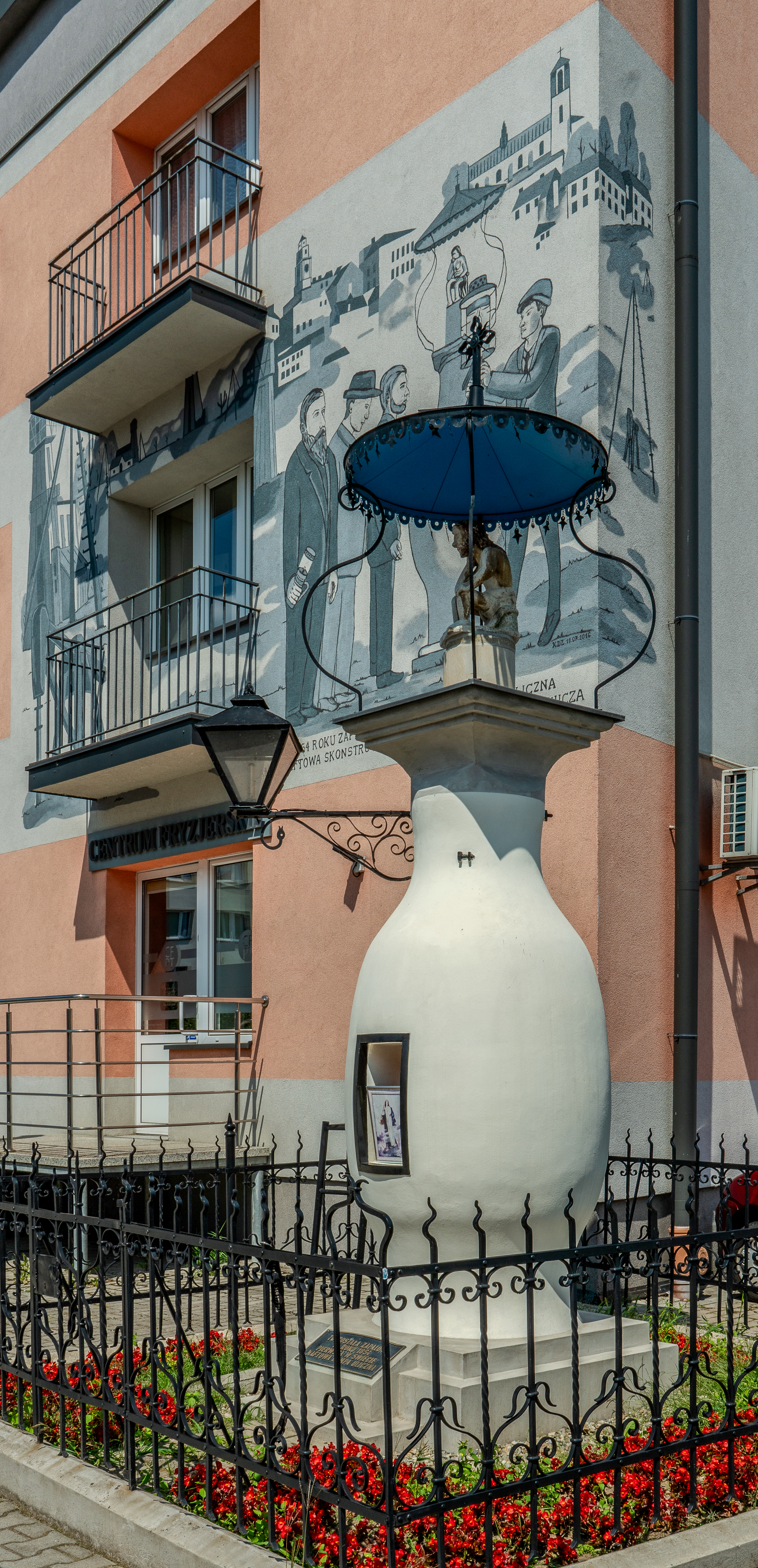
A monument at the site of the world's first kerosene lamp

As a result of the First Partition of Poland (Treaty of St-Petersburg dated 5 July 1772), the town was annexed by the Habsburg Empire (for more details, read the article Kingdom of Galicia and Lodomeria). In 1806, the Austrian government sold the town to a local nobleman, Jan Nepomucen Stadnicki of Roznow.

Until 1918, the town remained part of Austria-Hungary (Cisleithania) after the compromise of 1867, head (since 1865) of the county with the same name, one of the 78 Bezirkshauptmannschaften in Austrian Galicia province (Crown land). By the mid-19th century, the population of Gorlice reached 4000. The town entered the period of its prosperity after its 1854–1858 resident Ignacy Łukasiewicz invented the kerosene lamp in 1853. In a few years, sprawling oil wells emerged in Gorlice, and the town was called the cradle of Polish oil industry; its rapid industrialization was spurred with the construction of a railroad (1883).

By the early 20th century, the population of Gorlice grew to 6,000, but its development was halted by World War I. The city was the focal point of the German Gorlice-Tarnów Offensive during World War I, in May 1915. Extremely heavy and prolonged fighting took place here, Gorlice frequently changed hands, and as a result, the town was completely destroyed. Hence the "Gorlice fair" or "Gorlice days" held every year during the May Bank Holidays and adjoining days, which are enjoyed by many visitors both domestic and from abroad.

=== 20th century ===
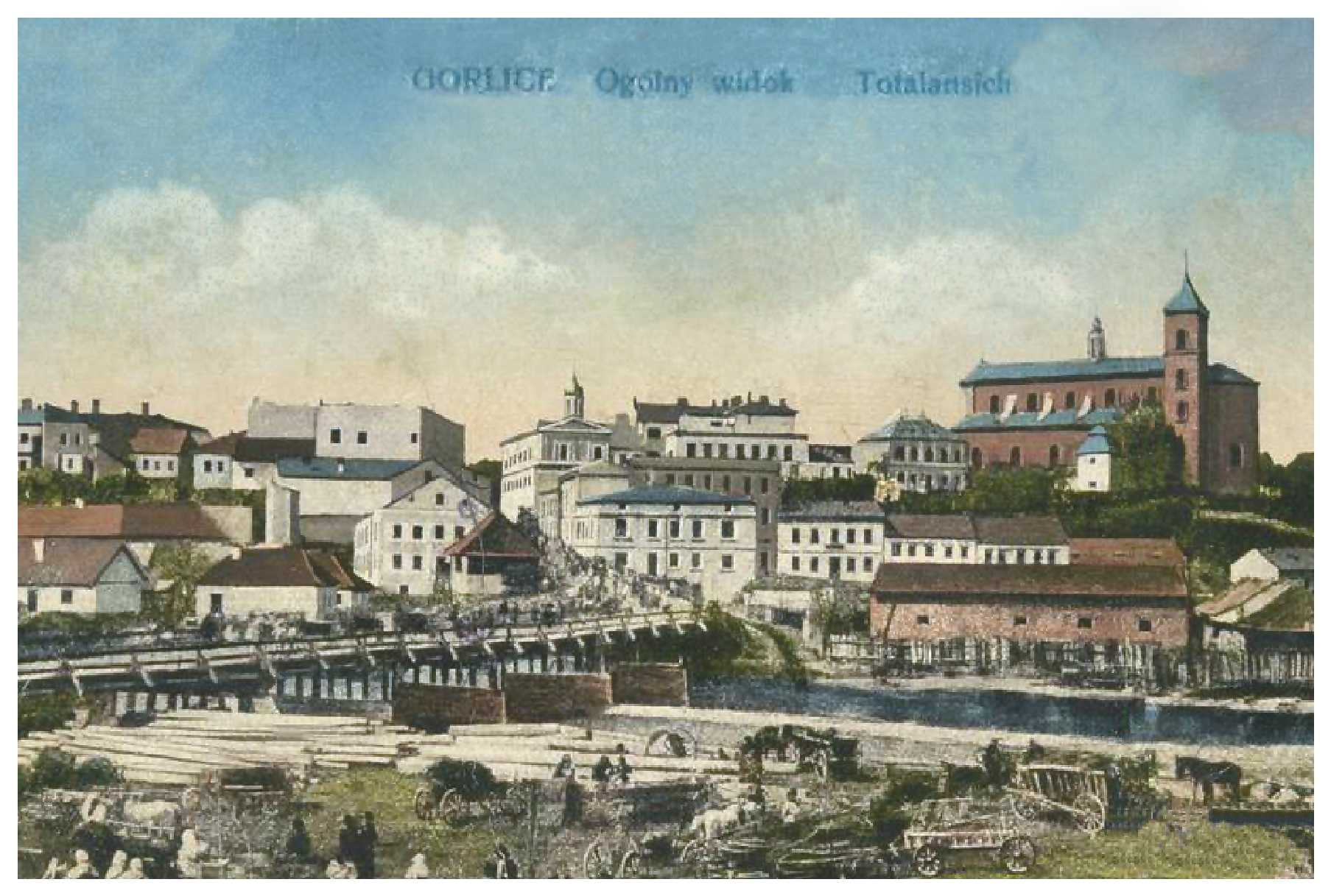
An early 20th century postcard of Gorlice

During the First World War, Gorlice played a strategically significant role in the 1915 Gorlice-Tarnów Offensive. On May 1, 1915, the combined forces of Austria-Hungary and Germany initiated artillery barrages against Russian soldiers stationed on the battle line stretching from Gorlice to Tarnów. The following day, Austro-German infantry units launched an unsuccessful attack near Tarnow. In Gorlice, the weakened Russian forces were unable to defend against the Austrian and German attackers. On May 6, General Radko-Dmitriev, commander of the Russian Third Army, ordered his troops to retreat. An attempt by General Radko-Dmitriev to counterattack on May 7 and 8 resulted in disaster for the Russians, as German reinforcements outnumbered the defenders. The following spring, General Alexei Brusilov, commander of the Russian Eighth Army, launched a counteroffensive that nearly destroyed the Austro-Hungarian Army. The Brusilov Offensive, as it is known, is regarded as one of the most successful operations in the First World War.

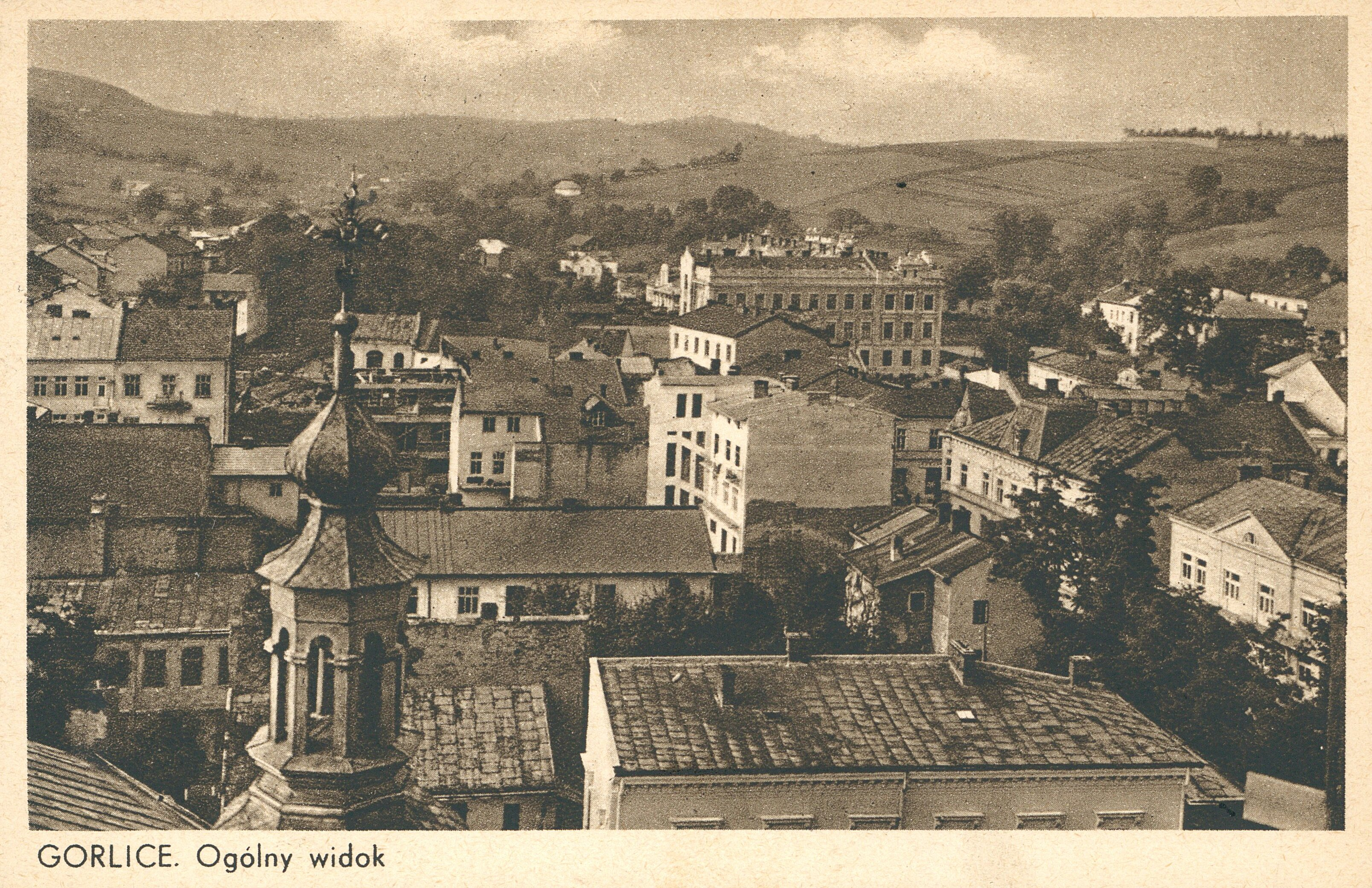
Gorlice in 1937

In the Second Polish Republic, Gorlice belonged to Kraków Voivodeship. Since local oil wells had been almost exhausted, the center of Polish oil industry moved eastwards, to Borysław. This resulted in widespread unemployment, street demonstrations and increased popularity of Communist ideology among local workers. On 1 May 1936, a May Day rally attracted 20,000 people.

The German occupation of Gorlice began on 7 September 1939 (see Invasion of Poland). During the war, the town's Jewish community was first herded by Nazi Germans into the newly formed Gorlice Ghetto and then murdered at Belzec. On 16 January 1945, the Red Army liberated Gorlice.

=== History of Jews in Gorlice ===
When Gorlice was first founded there were not any Jewish communities. Most of the Jews in the area would live in villages or Polish landowners estates. There were a few reasons for Jews at this time to not live within Gorlice. One was the Magdeburg Rights, by living outside of Gorlice in villages or on estates, the Jewish communities did not have to follow the city's laws. Some of the suburbs that Jews did live in were Ropica Polska, Siary, Strezeszyn, Marianpolski and Magdaleni. Another reason that Jews were not residing in Gorlice in earlier times was because of "De non tolerandis Judaeis". This was a ruling that some cities had during the 16th century, forbidding Jews from living in them. (These were anti-Semitic edicts, used to prevent competition in business and other areas of work).

In the 18th century there were a few Jewish families living in Gorlice. When the Jews first settled in Gorlice they were mostly making a living through trading wine and corn. The first Jewish families also had a sawmill to process wood as well as trading items like wine, corn, and tobacco. Even though there were only a few Jewish families during the 18th century, when the 19th century came around there was already a Jewish community forming including their own cemetery and synagogue. It was not until the later half of the 19th century that Jewish people started really settling into the city. The Jews settling in Gorlice at that time were mostly settling in the area by the market square and its nearby streets. This area that most Jews were settling in would in the future, under German occupation, become the Gorlice Ghetto.

In the 19th century, when more Jews started settling inside of Gorlice, the current non-Jewish residents worked mostly in crafts and agriculture. At the time that the Jews were moving into Gorlice, there was also the discovery of oil in the Gorlice region in that later half of the 19th century. While the non-Jewish residents were working with agriculture, the Jews were prevailing in the oil industry with trade and development. In 1874, Jewish investors helped with the development of an oil refinery, along with another one nearby in 1883.

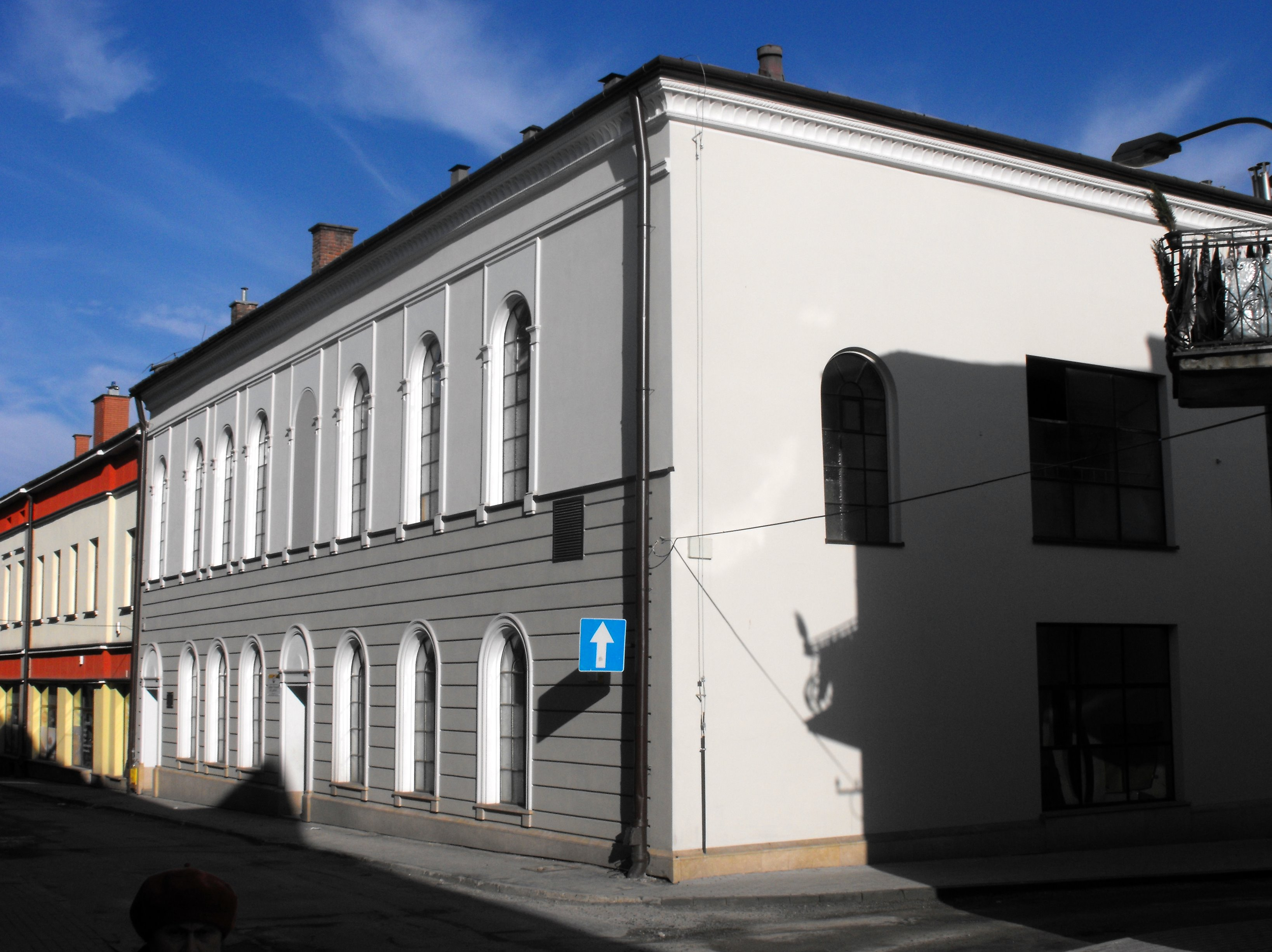
Former synagogue

The population of the Jews in Gorlice is not well documented or reliable before the latter half of the 19th century. There are statistics on the Jewish population from 1880 to 1910 though. Looking first at the Gorlice district in 1880 there was a total of 74,072 residents and out of those 6.4% (4,755) were Jews. Just in the city of Gorlice itself, there were 2,257 Jews out of the around 5,000 residents of the city which is close to 50%. The population of Jews in Gorlice grew to 7.5% of the Gorlice district composed of Jews in 1910 and 51% of residents in the City of Gorlice were Jewish at that time (3,495 out of 6,600).

Because of World War I, the population did drop during the period of 1910 to 1921. In 1921, after the war, there were about 2,300 Jews left, which was about 41% of the population. During World War I, the Russian army was one of the main reasons for this drop in the number of Jews. There were rapes, robberies, and murders, and many Jews fled Gorlice to other countries and never came back after the war.

Even though the war affected the Jewish population, they were able to get back on their feet and restore their economic status to what it was pre-war. 90% of shops in Gorlice were Jewish and 30% of craft workshops. Jews contributed much to the Gorlice economy and their activity was an important part of the industrial and commercial life. They led in trade and other services. Jews were also represented in the Municipal Authorities at this time. There were 22 members of the Town Council who were Jewish in 1924 and during municipal elections that year there were 23 Jews elected. Not only were they thriving in the economy, the Jewish life was also ideal culturally and religiously at this time. Cultural and religious life was centered around two synagogues in the city, one on Mickiewicza Street and another newer one on Piekarska Street.

When World War II started in 1939, the population of the Jews in Gorlice was back up to around 5000 which was once again above half of the residents of the city. Approximately 3,400 persons were sent to the Gorlice Ghetto. When that was liquidated in September 1942 the remaining Jews were sent to Belzec, the first mass extermination camp, where the Nazis perfected their use of the gas chamber. It achieved an average kill rate of 50,000 a month.

== Geography ==
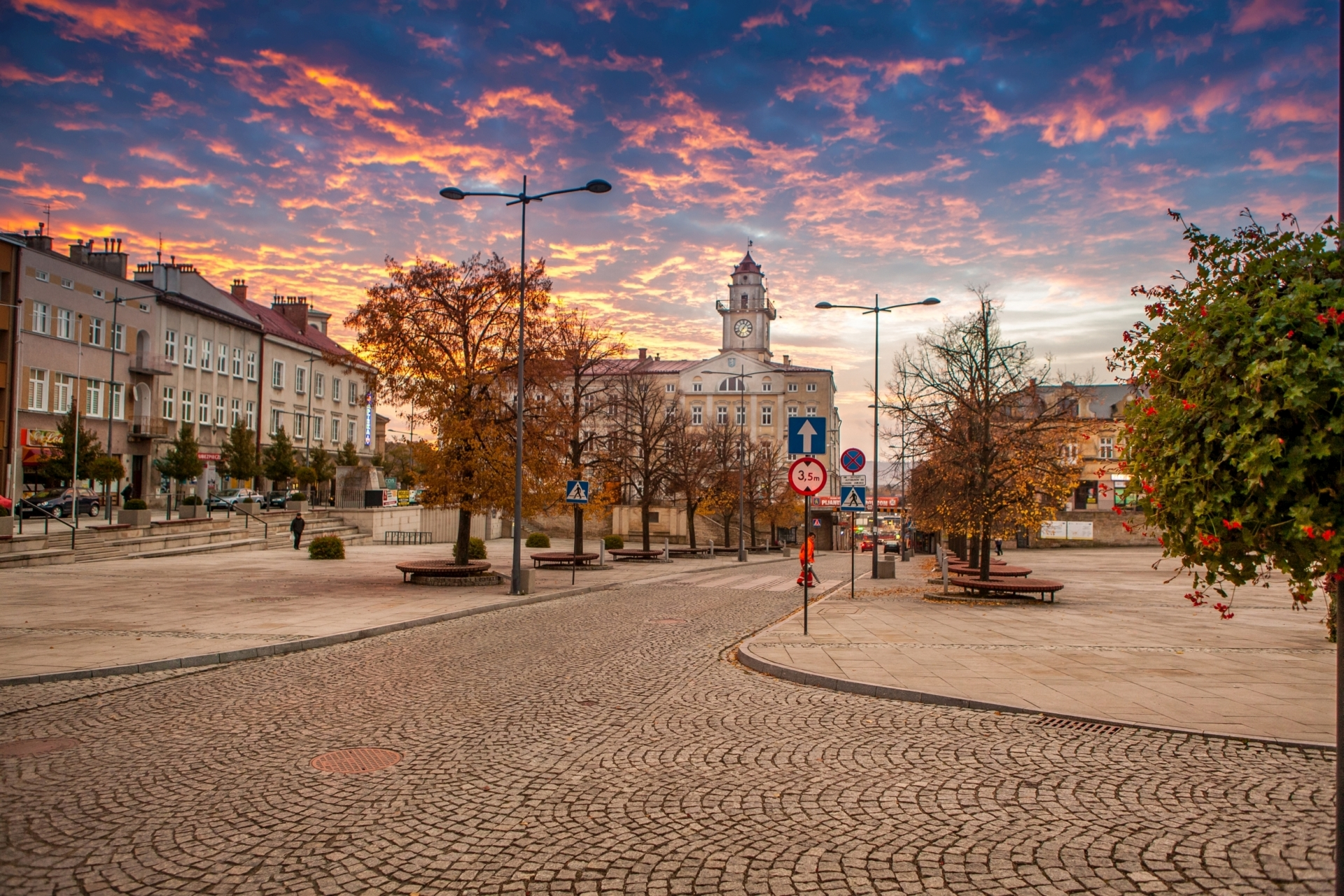
Gorlice market square

The city lies between the Ropa and Sękówka river valleys, surrounded by several mountain ranges of the Carpathian Mountains, namely their part called Beskid Niski (Low Beskids) massive. It is located in the heartland of the Doły (Pits), and its average elevation above sea level is 380 metres (1,247 feet), although there are some more considerable hills located within the confines of the city. The city is nowadays situated in a heavily populated region 14.6 miles (23.5 kilometres) from Jasło, 21.2 mi (34.1 km) from Nowy Sącz, 25.5 mi (41.0 km) from Tarnów, and 62.6 mi (100.7 km) from Kraków. Gorlice is known in Ukrainian: as Horlytsi, Горлиці; in Yiddish: גאָרליץ as Gorlitz; and in German: as Görlitz.

== Notable figures ==
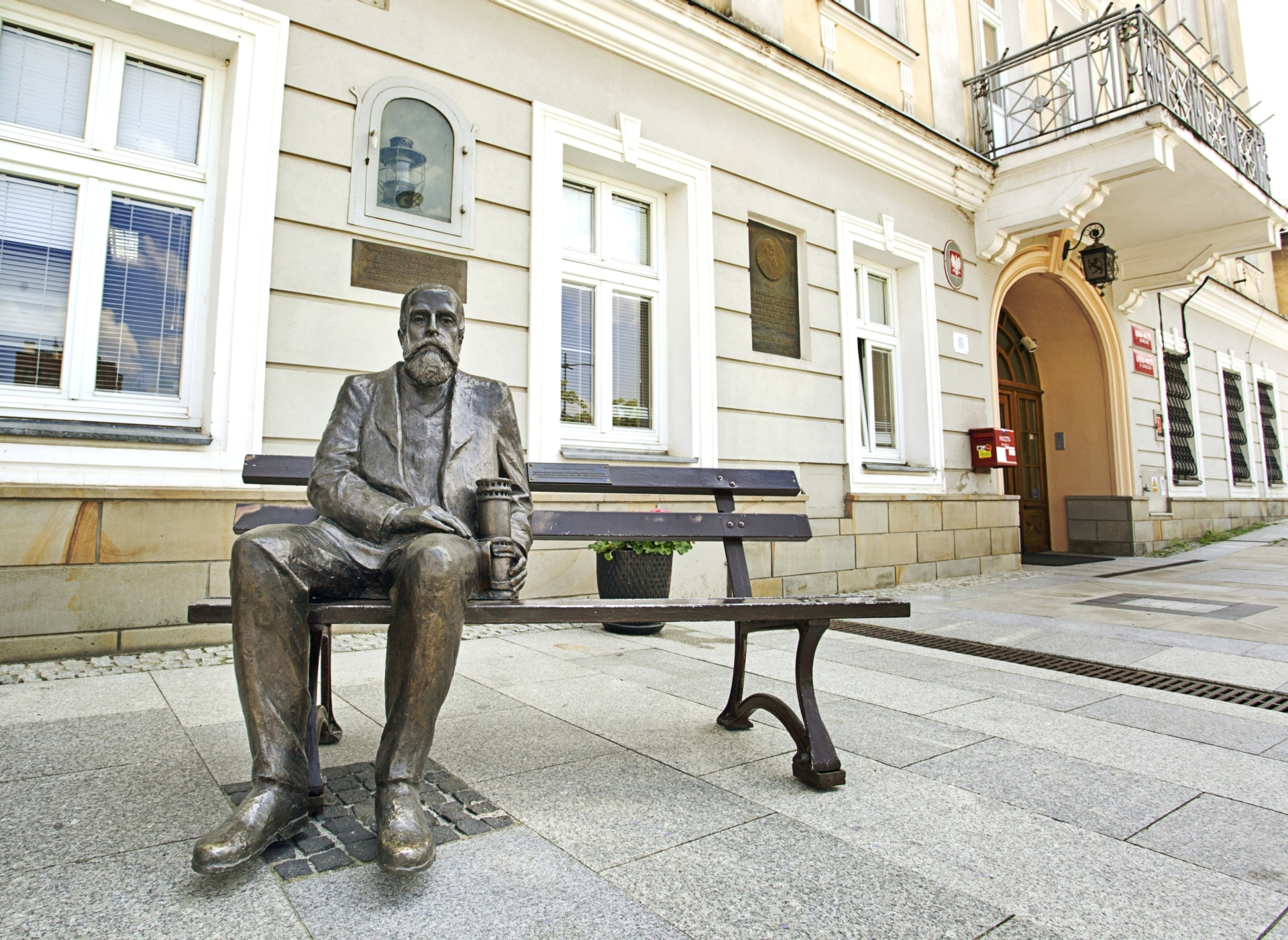
Ignacy Łukasiewicz memorial bench

- Barbara Bartuś (born 1967), politician
- Robert Drąg (born 1983), footballer
- Joseph Durst (1882–1974), American real estate developer and philanthropist
- Douglas Emhoff (born 1964), American lawyer and second gentleman of the United States. Emhoff's ancestry traces to the Jewish community of Gorlice.
- Shmuel Fuhrer (1863-1942), rabbi (born in Sękowa, he was ordained at age 20 and led the Jewish community of Milowka. In 1904, he was chosen to organize the growing Jewish population of Krosno. During his thirty-five-year tenure serving the Krosno Jewish community, rabbi Fuhrer oversaw the establishment of a Jewish cemetery. In 1942, the Germans shot and killed rabbi Fuhrer.)
- Paweł Kisielow (born 1945), immunologist
- Eugeniusz Kozierowski, 19th century physician (Using a method of transillumination pioneered by Walery Jaworski, he diagnosed neoplastic pylorostenosis)
- Ignacy Łukasiewicz (1822-1882), pharmacist, engineer, inventor, petroleum industry pioneer (lived in the town)
- Mirosław Nahacz (1984–2007), novelist
- Antoni Reichenberg (1825–1903), priest, Jesuit, and artist
- Jarosław Królewski (born 1986), Polish entrepreneur, programmer, sociologist, investor, cofounder and chief executive of the software development company Synerise, majority stakeholder of the Polish soccer club Wisła Kraków.
- Daniel Lewinski (28.03.1977), Singer, Painter.

== International relations ==
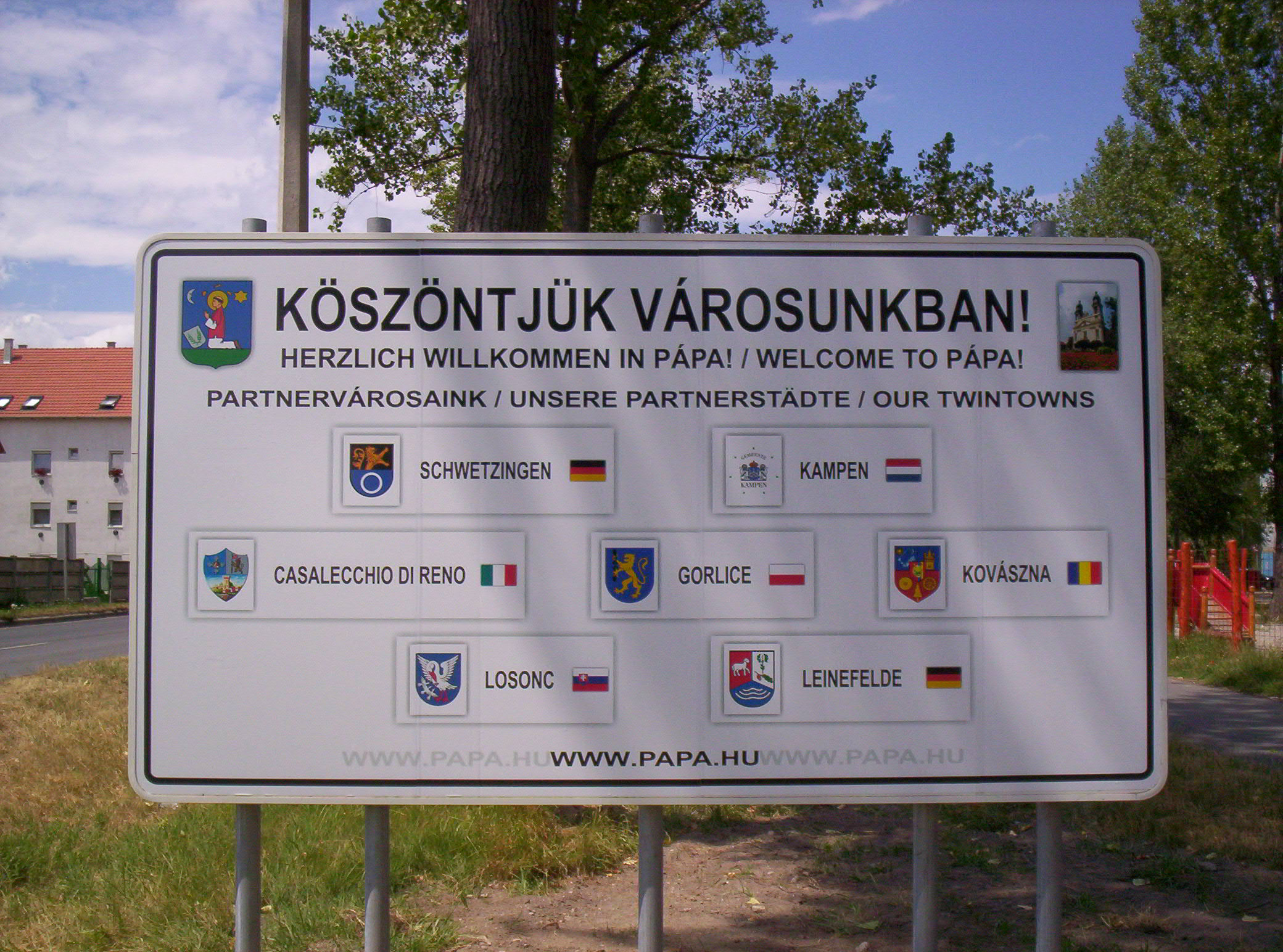
Sign in Pápa showing twin towns.

=== Twin towns—Sister cities ===
Gorlice is twinned with:

- Bardejov, Slovakia
- Pápa, Hungary
