= Radocyna =

- Village
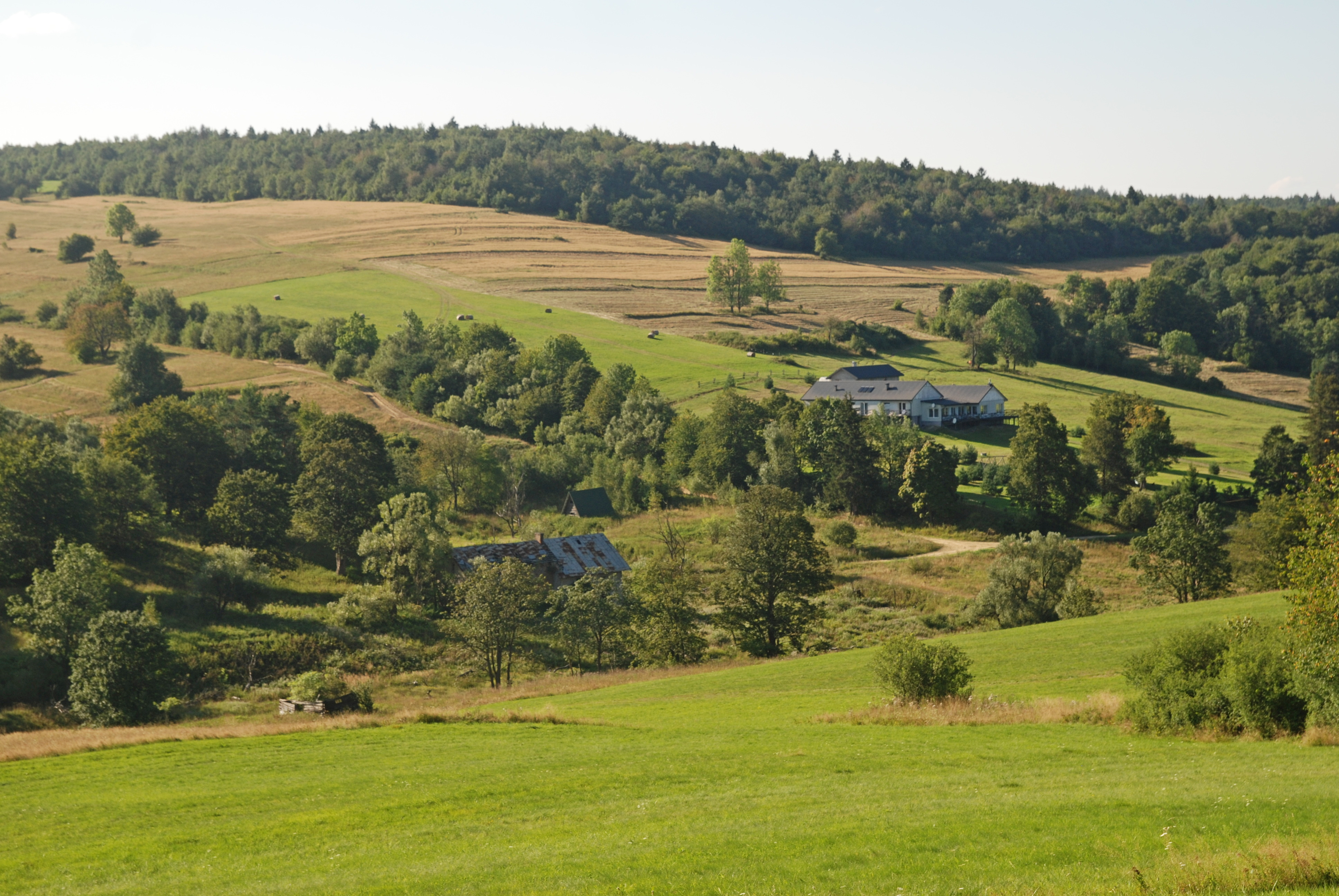
- Interactive map of Radocyna
- Location within Poland
- Coordinates: 49°28′N 21°23′E
- Country: Poland
- Voivodeship: Lesser Poland
- County: Gorlice
- Gmina: Sękowa
- Population: 2

Radocyna (Polish pronunciation: [radɔˈt͡sɨna]; Ukrainian: Радоцина, Radotsyna) is an uninhabited village in the administrative district of Gmina Sękowa, within Gorlice County, Lesser Poland Voivodeship, in southern Poland, close to the border with Slovakia.
