= Czarne, Lesser Poland Voivodeship =

Czarne
- Village
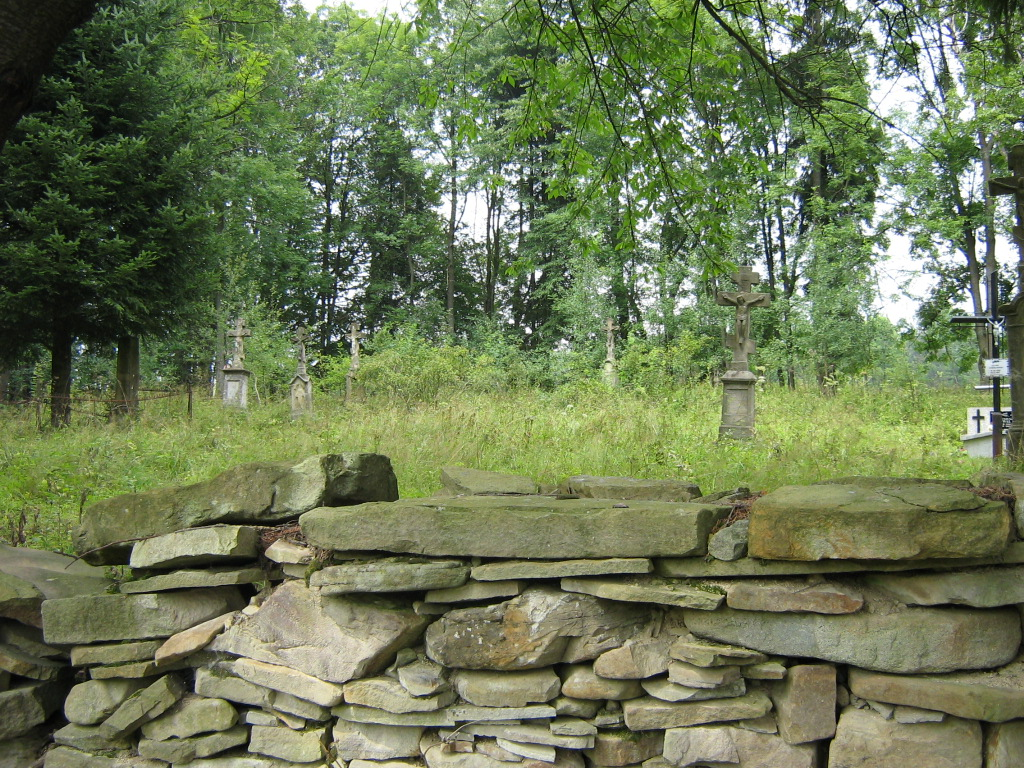
- Lemko graveyard, Czarne

- Location within Poland
- Coordinates: 49°29′N 21°21′E
- Country: Poland
- Voivodeship: Lesser Poland
- County: Gorlice
- Gmina: Sękowa
- Population: 10

Czarne (Note: Lemko Rusyn: Чорнe) is a village in the administrative district of Gmina Sękowa, within Gorlice County, Lesser Poland Voivodeship, in southern Poland, close to the border with Slovakia.
