= Gorlice Ghetto =

Nazi ghetto in occupied Poland

A map of Poland during its German Occupation.

The Gorlice Ghetto was established in 1940 after German occupation of the Polish city began on September 7, 1939. As one of many ghettos created by Nazi Germany in the General Government, its establishment meant further persecution and violence against the nearly 3,400 Jewish citizens that were settled in the area. As German forces quickly seized hundreds of the young, able men of Gorlice in order to use them for forced labor, many Jews began hiding for their lives as their businesses were taken and the rapid spread of disease plagued the city. The ghetto was officially dissolved on September 14, 1942, and carried with its downfall the transportation of hundreds of Jews to the concentration camp located in Bełżec.

== History ==
In Gorlice, the German occupation of September 7, 1939 marked the beginnings of establishing a ghetto in the city, as the Wehrmacht began taking Jews from their homes, robbing them of their possessions, and forcing them into labor-intensive work. Jewish businesses were taken over and implemented into fabricated "trustee" groups by the Germans. Though some owners were granted access to keep their businesses running, many women ended up taking over the establishments, as the Jewish men went into hiding, attempting to escape from a life of forced labor by the Reich.

== Population and consumption ==
During the first year of occupation, the Jewish population of Gorlice actually increased, despite the increase of violence in the area and the initial move many residents took beginning at the outbreak of the war in Europe. Hundreds of refugees from Germany poured into the city following increases of violence instances within the country, most famously that of Kristallnacht. With this increase in community size, food shortages became a problem for families in the area. Soup kitchens, like those opened by Judenrat in 1940, were rare sources of nourishment for the thousands of refugees.

Smuggling food became a necessary part of survival for many Jews occupying Gorlice, many obtaining sustenance from the neighboring country of Slovakia, nearly nineteen miles away from the location of the ghetto. The ghetto itself was guarded by Ukrainian police officials and, though they were firm in serving the local Gestapo, some officers aided the Jews inside by helping them to smuggling food supplies like coffee, tea, and cocoa into Gorlice. This kind of desperation was indicative of the overarching Nazi motive behind ghettoization of so many parts of Europe, that being to drain all physical elements of worth from the Jewish people in hopes to drive them out of what was to become a greater German population. The hard conditions and starvation within the occupied areas was meant to force the Jews to sell all their possessions in order to afford food and drink to survive. Soon, many families found themselves drained of all resources and food became a "luxury" of the "wealthy."

== Conditions ==
The ghettos in German occupied Poland in the early 1940s became overrun with sickness and fatal diseases. Due to lack of proper nutrition or resources, it became a common occurrence to have entire families ill to the point of no return with little means to cure their ailments. Until 1941, no Jewish doctors were given access to help patients leaving many dead from lack of proper healthcare. Late 1940 saw a small hospital open for affected Jews through funding from the Judenrat and Jewish doctors and physicians from the Kraków district from the JSS (Jewish Self Help) organization. Though this was all set up with good intention, little funding translated into gaining access to vital medicines, leaving many with a lack of aid. Notably, the Dr. Otstanki "put aside his antisemitic convictions" and attempted to attend to the sick of Gorlice, at great risk of being persecuted by Nazi SS forces. Other doctors, like Dr. Feldmaus arrived in 1941, and by fall there were two dental service posts opened within the ghetto.

== Persecution in the ghetto ==
German SS forces controlled nearly every aspect of life for the Jews within the Gorlice Ghetto, and instances of intense violence or discrimination were common within the area. Beatings of Jewish men, women, and children on public streets became part of living in the ghetto, and vicious kidnapping of Jewish men in hiding happened more often than not, leading to more Jews being forced into going to labor camps. As the Judenrat became a bigger source of aid to the Jews in Gorlice, they began to feed into Nazi opposition. Rumors in 1942 flew about that the ghetto would soon be liquidated, and in an effort to enforce their control over the Jewish citizens of the occupied territory, Nazi forces ordered all the men of the ghetto to the town square. They demanded for 250,000 złoty, an amount unpayable by the starving and poor living in Gorlice. Many hid from the SS forces in an effort to escape this persecution, and all who were found hiding were shot on site. Some Jews from the square were selected to go to the Płaszow concentration camp, were forced to undress, and were shot against open mass graves. Members of the Jewish Police and the Judenrat were lined against buildings with their families and, one by one, were murdered. Some laborers whose work proved "essential" to the German forces were kept alive, transported to paper factories, and were continuously forced to work. All other Jews who were no longer needed were taken to a shoe factory miles away, being starved during the three day journey.
