= Wapienne =

- Village
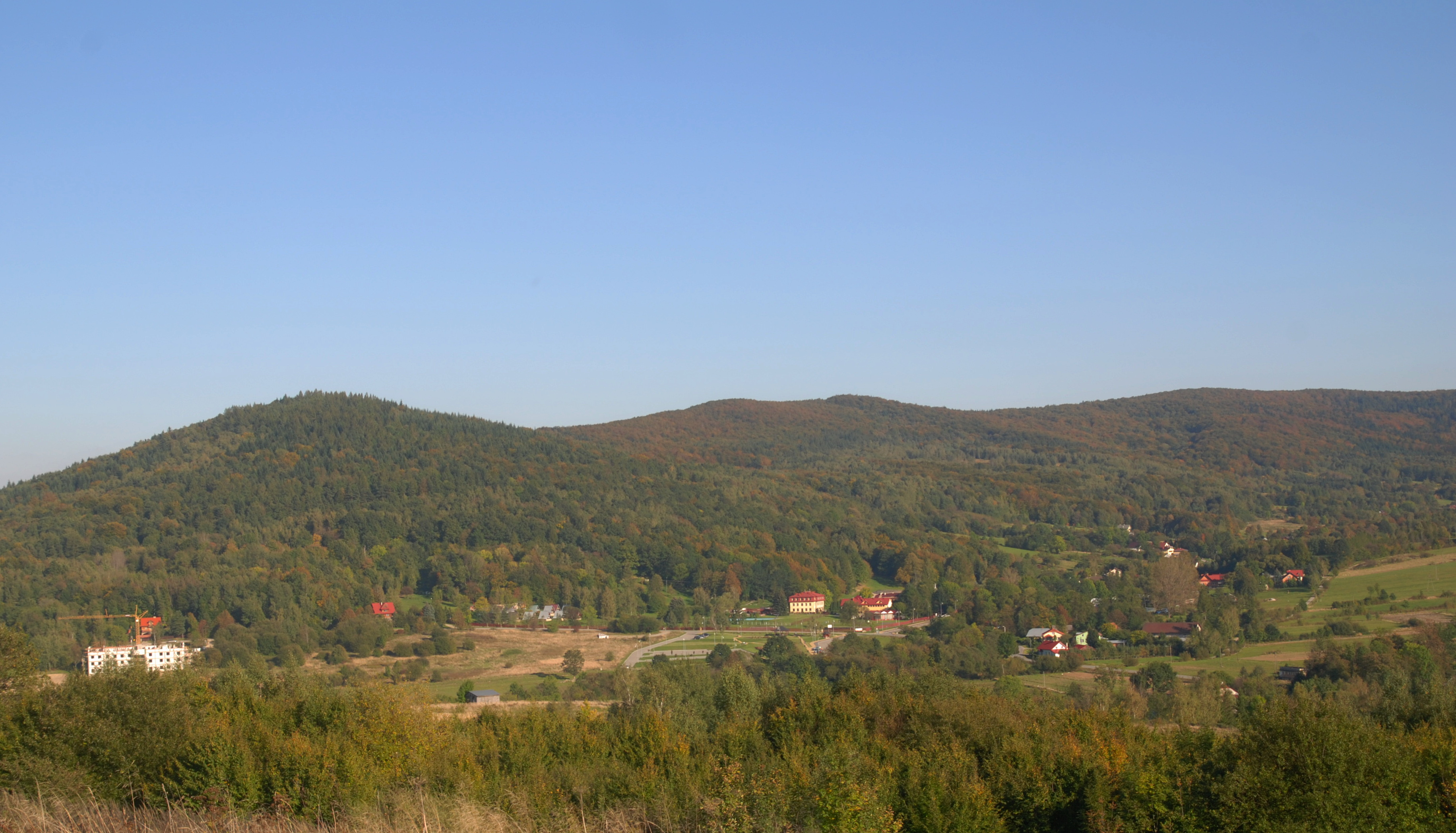

- Location within Poland
- Coordinates: 49°38′N 21°17′E
- Country: Poland
- Voivodeship: Lesser Poland
- County: Gorlice
- Gmina: Sękowa
- Population: 150

Wapienne [vaˈpʲɛnːɛ] is a village in the administrative district of Gmina Sękowa, within Gorlice County, Lesser Poland Voivodeship, in southern Poland, close to the border with Slovakia.
