= Pętna =

- Village
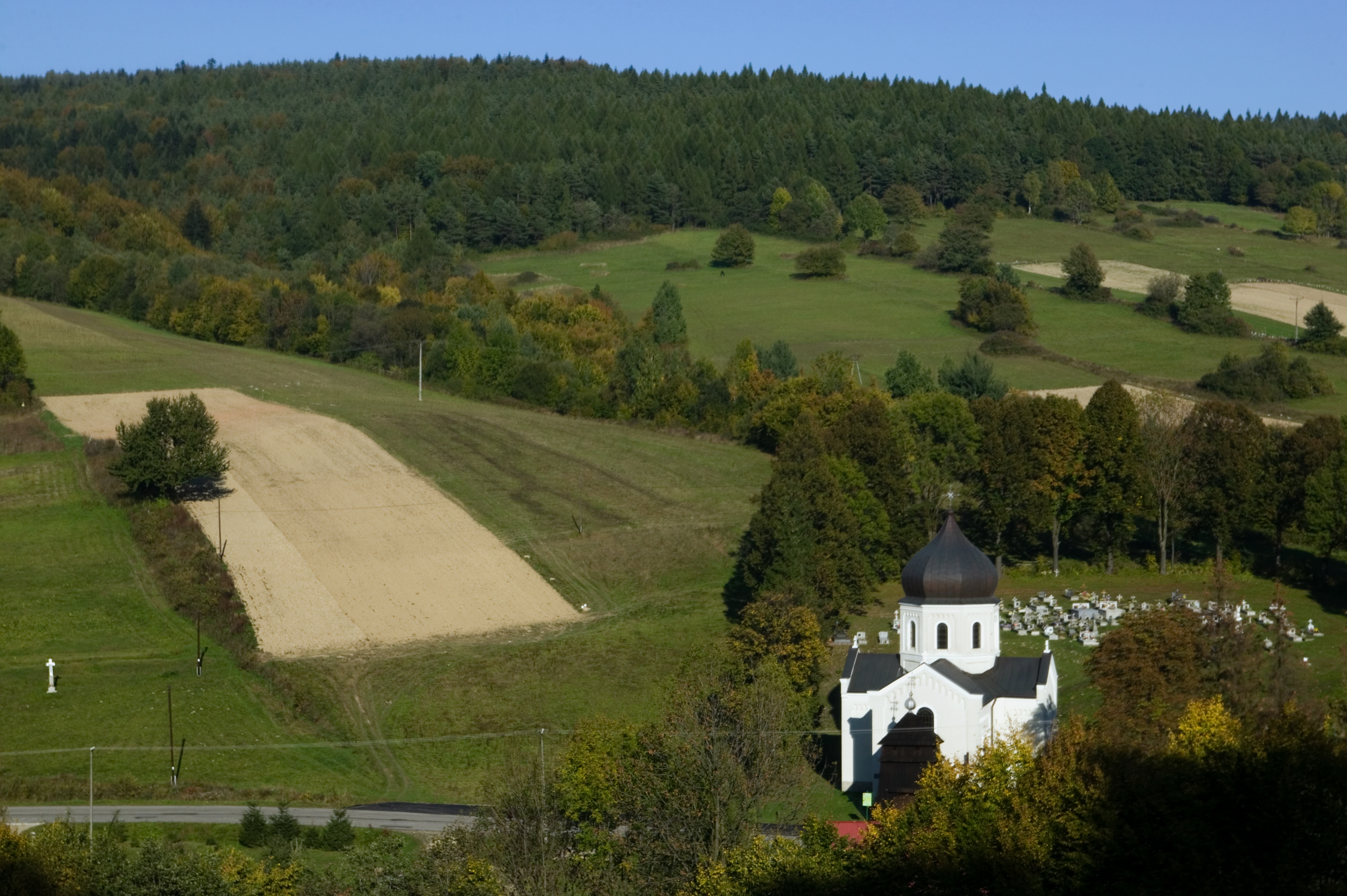

- Location within Poland
- Coordinates: 49°34′N 21°16′E
- Country: Poland
- Voivodeship: Lesser Poland
- County: Gorlice
- Gmina: Sękowa

Pętna [ˈpɛntna] (Ukrainian: Пантна, Pantna) is a village in the administrative district of Gmina Sękowa, within Gorlice County, Lesser Poland Voivodeship, in southern Poland, close to the border with Slovakia.
