= Antoni Reichenberg =

Polish priest, Jesuit, and artist (1825–1903)

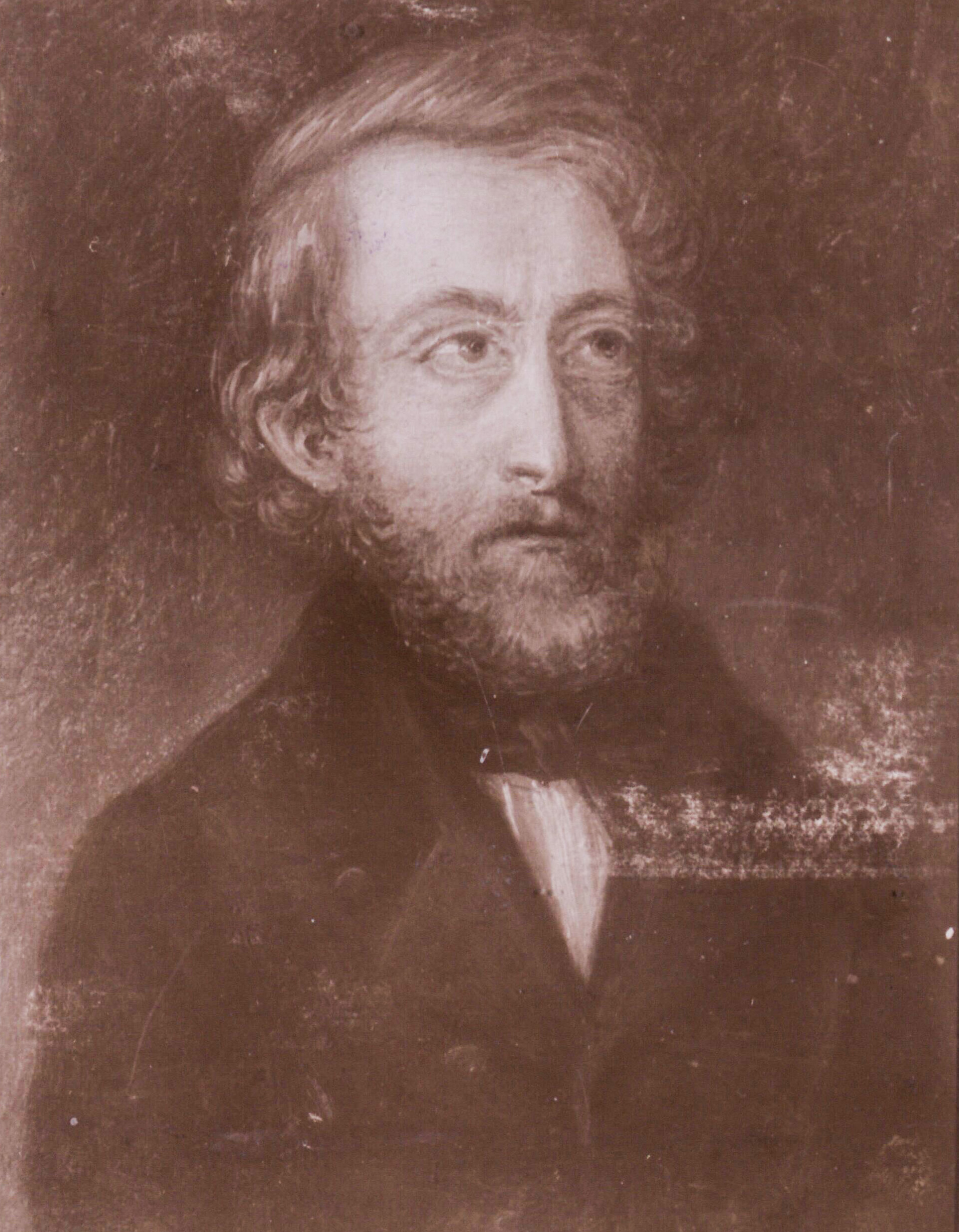
- Born: 7 June 1825; Gorlice, Austrian Empire
- Died: 23 January 1903 (aged 77); Ternopil, Austria-Hungary
- Occupation: Jesuit priest
- Known for: Paintings

Antoni Reichenberg (7 June 1825 – 23 January 1903) was a Polish priest, Jesuit, and artist. He took care of orphans and the poor in Ternopil.

== Biography ==
In 1848, he participated in the Hungarian Revolution.

Reichenberg studied painting in Budapest and the Munich Academy of Arts, graduating in 1862. During his studies, he was friends with Jan Matejko.

He studied theology in Munich and Przemyśl, where he was ordained a priest on 13 September 1868. On 7 December 1869, he entered the Jesuit novitiate in Stara Wieś. In 1871, he joined the Society of Jesus.

From 1875 he lived in Ternopil. From 1875 to 1887, he was a professor of drawings at the Jesuit convivium; in 1884–1885 he was prefect of the student hospital, and in 1886 he taught German. He founded two shelters for the poor in the city, where he worked after the liturgy. Every day at 7 p.m. Reichenberg prayed at the figure of St. Tekla on Panska Street in Ternopil.

He died on 23 January 1903 in Ternopil. He was buried on 27 January 1903 at the Mykulyntsi cemetery in Ternopil, where the tombstone bears an inscription: "To the guardian of the poor, Antoni Reichenberg T. I., grateful citizens of Ternopil". The grave of Fr. Antoni Reichenberg was declared a newly discovered monument of cultural heritage.

== Works ==
He was a talented artist. Among his works are the image "Our Lady of Sorrows" (kept in Stara Wieś) and a portrait of Alfred Potocki (until 1918 it hung in the hall of the Galician Sejm).

== Sources ==
- Brząkalski, J.O.; Reichenberg, T.I. (1904). Nakładem Apostolstwa Modlitwy (in Polish). Kraków.
- Paszenda, J.; Reichenberg, Antoni. Słownik artystów polskich i obcych w Polsce działających (zmarłych przed 1966 r.). Malarze, rzeźbiarze, graficy (in Polish). Vol. VIII: Pó-Ri. Warsaw: Urszuli Markowskiej i Katarzyny Mikockiej-Rachubowej. Instytut Sztuki. ISBN 978-83-89101-69-3.
