= Bodaki, Lesser Poland Voivodeship =

Bodaki
- Village

- Location within Poland
- Coordinates: 49°35′24″N 21°17′36″E
- Country: Poland
- Voivodeship: Lesser Poland
- County: Gorlice
- Gmina: Sękowa

Bodaki [bɔˈdakʲi] (Note: Rusyn: Бодаки, Bodaky) is a village in the administrative district of Gmina Sękowa, within Gorlice County, Lesser Poland Voivodeship, in southern Poland, close to the border with Slovakia.
