= Siary =

- Village
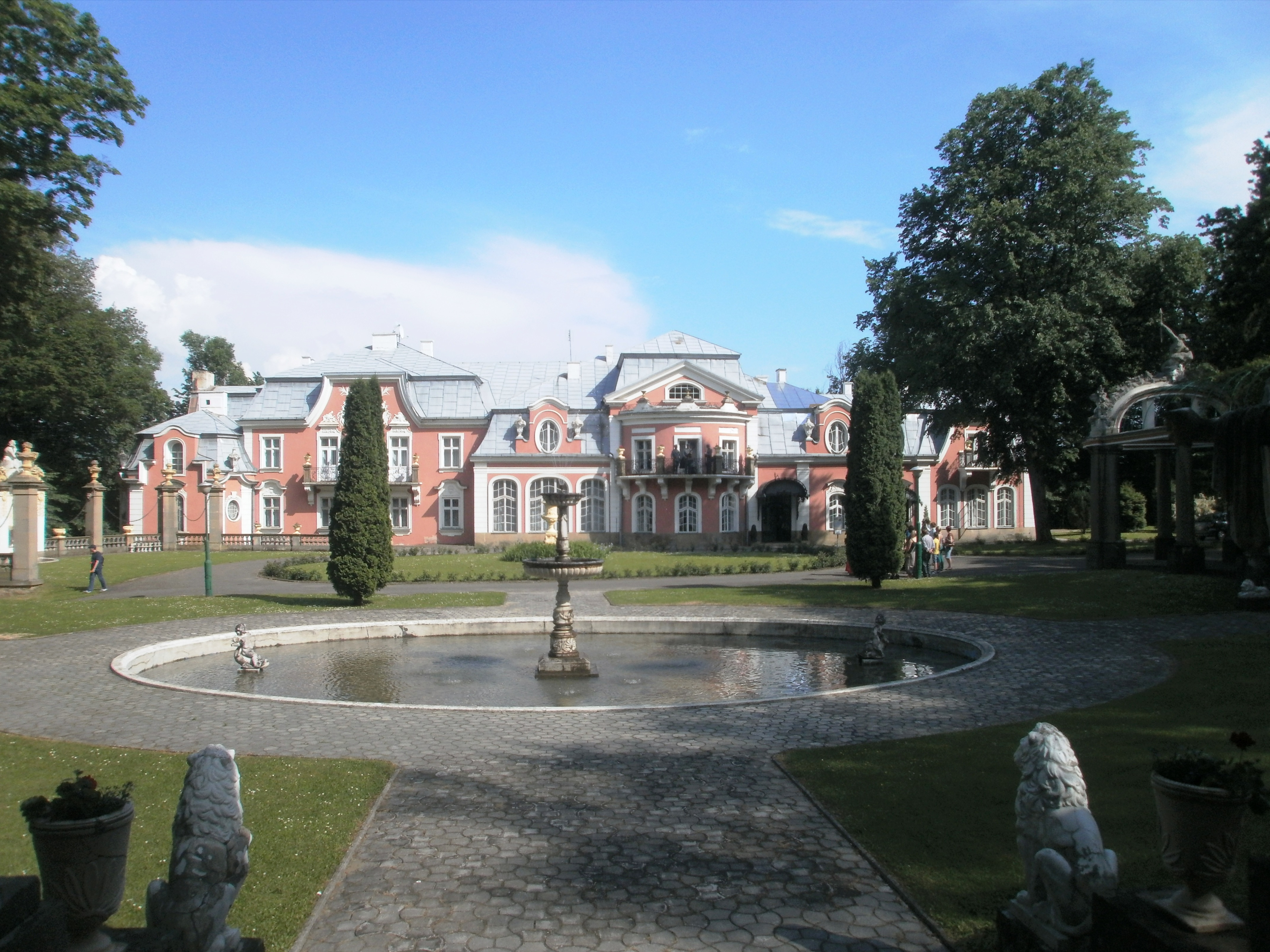
- Palace

- Location within Poland
- Coordinates: 49°37′N 21°10′E
- Country: Poland
- Voivodeship: Lesser Poland
- County: Gorlice
- Gmina: Sękowa

Siary [ˈɕarɨ] (Ukrainian: Сяри, Siary) is a village in the administrative district of Gmina Sękowa, within Gorlice County, Lesser Poland Voivodeship, in southern Poland, close to the border with Slovakia.
