= Muzeum Ziemi Bieckiej =

Polish museum of local history

Coordinates: 49.7305°N 21.2480°E

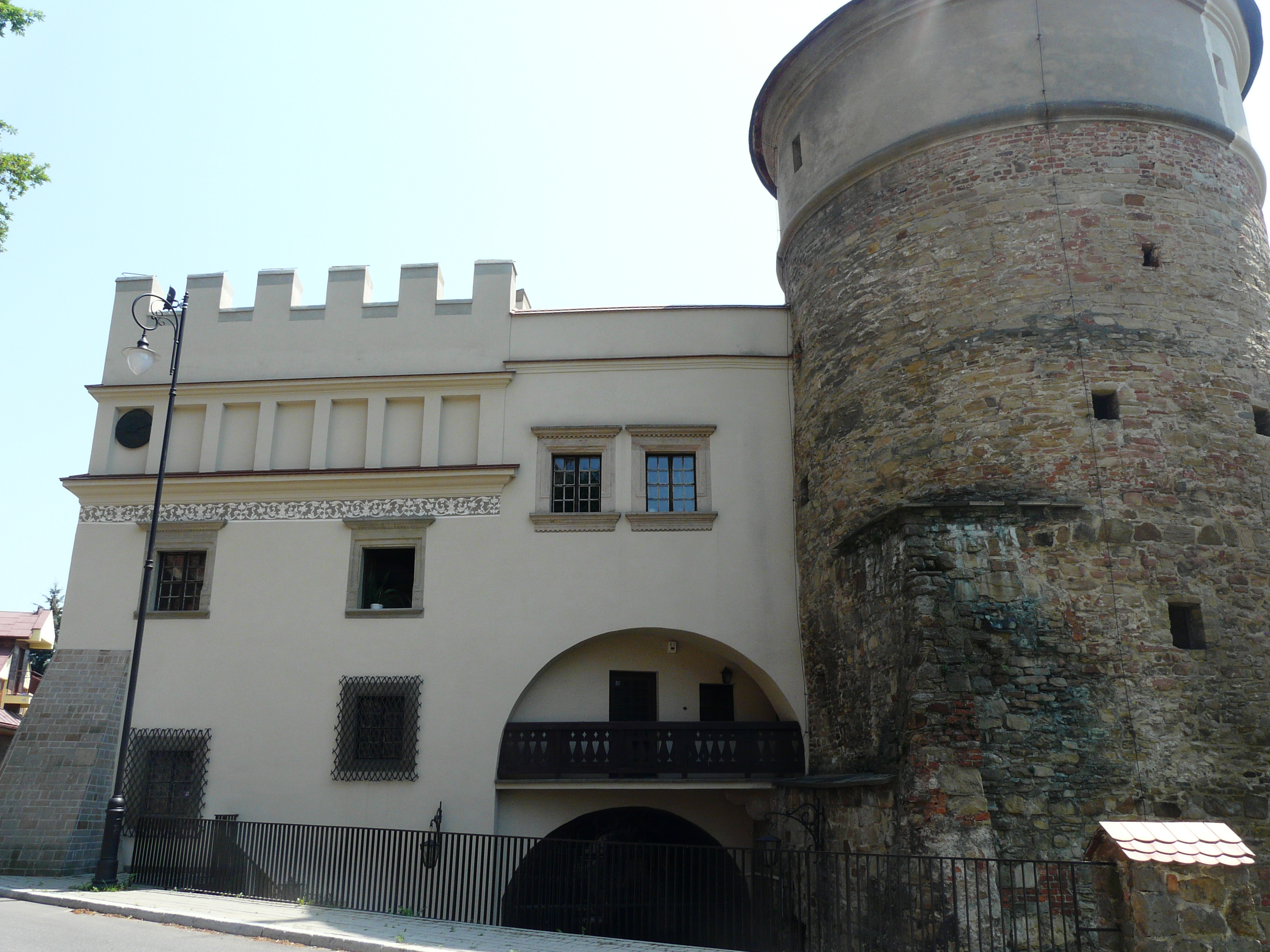
Front entrance

Muzeum Ziemi Bieckiej (Museum of Bieczan Lands) is a museum of local history located in the town of Biecz, Lesser Poland Voivodeship, Poland.

It has been founded in 1953 as the Muzeum Regionalne w Bieczu (Biecz Regional Museum). In 2003 the museum was renamed to its current name. The museum has four main venues. Kromerówka is a museum dedicated to Marcin Kromer, in a Renaissance 16th century kamienica. Dom z Basztą (The House with a Tower) is another 16th-century kamienica, with an exhibit about old apothecary shop, and various crafts, trades and guilds. Baszta Kowalska (Smith's Tower) and Turma pod Wieżą Ratuszową (old prison) form the remaining two exhibit venues.
