= Apolinary Kotowicz =

Polish painter, set decorator and photographer

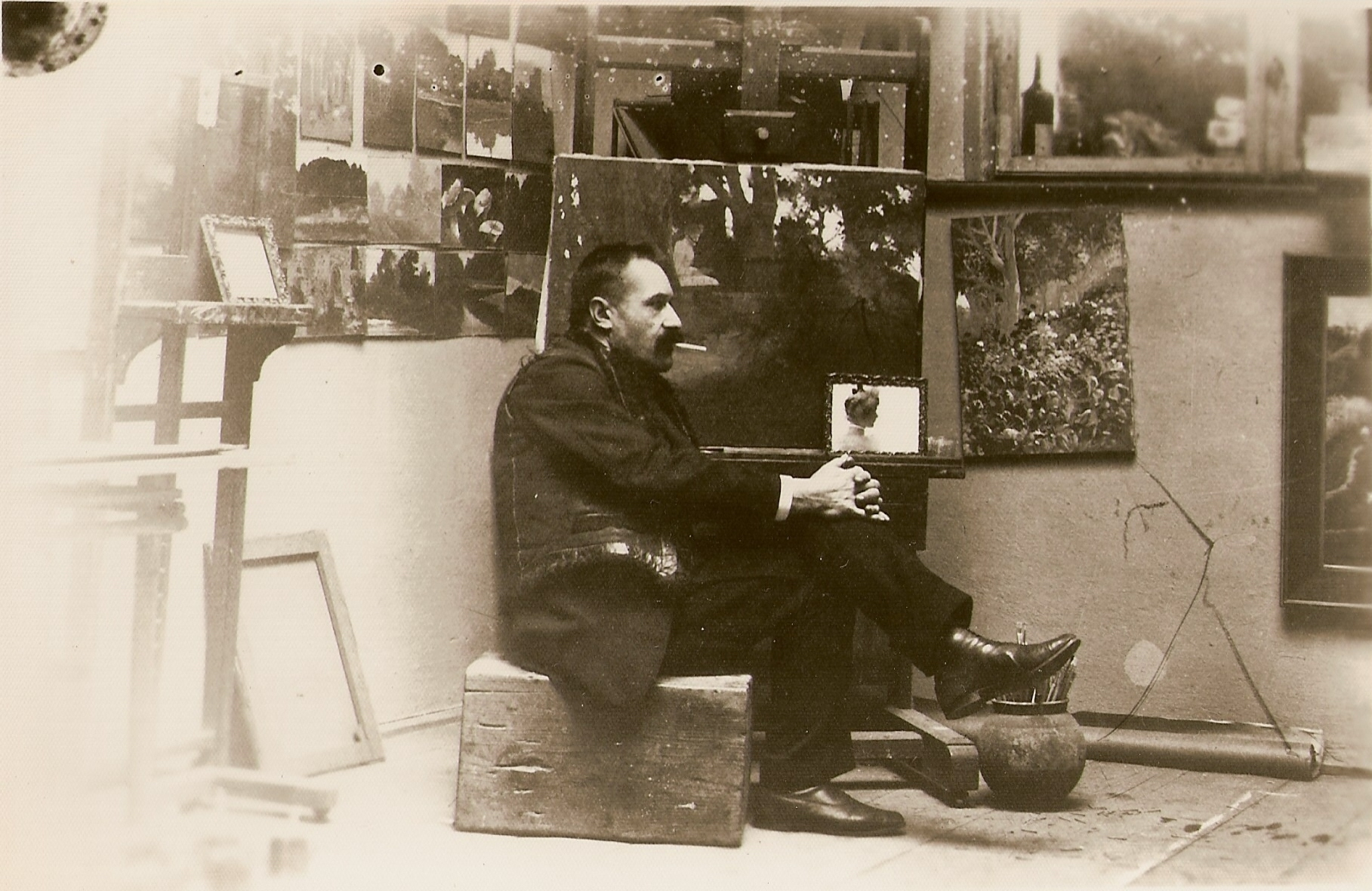
Apolinary Kotowicz in his studio; photograph by the artist.

Apolinary Stanisław Kotowicz (24 March 1859 – 21 April 1917) was a Polish painter of landscapes, portraits and genre scenes. He was also a set decorator and amateur photographer.

== Biography ==
Kotowicz was born on 24 March 1859 in Biecz. His father, Antoni Kotowicz (1816–1885) was a medical doctor and naturalist from Lwów. He began his education in Tarnów. In 1878, he moved to Kraków, where he spent most of his adult life. Through 1887, he studied at the Academy of Fine arts with Jan Matejko (history painting) and Władysław Łuszczkiewicz (drawing and anatomy). After graduating, he spent two years in Munich on a scholarship, where he studied at a private school operated by Simon Hollósy, who took him on field trips to the Hungarian countryside.

Upon returning home, he began to exhibit regularly at the showings of the Kraków Society of Friends of Fine Arts. From 1894 to 1895, he was one of the artists who participated in creating the Panorama Tatr, a view of the Tatra Mountains that measured 115 meters (337 ft.) by 16 meters (52 ft.), making it the largest Polish panorama and the only one to feature a landscape rather than historical scenes. It was on display in Warsaw for three years (1896–1899), when the promoters went bankrupt and it was sold to Jan Styka, a panorama painter. It disappeared during World War I.

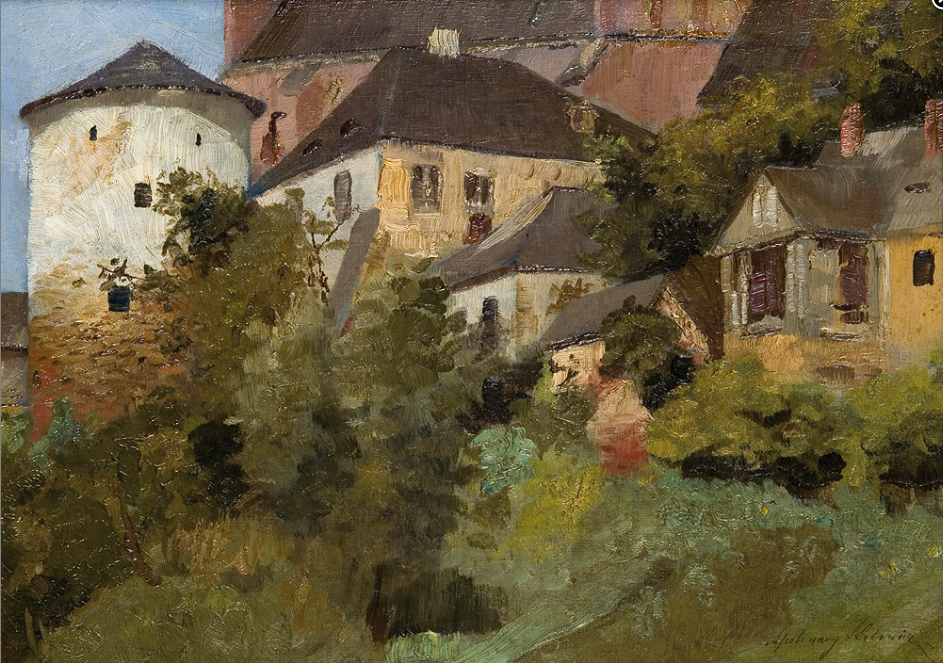
Old Town in Biecz

From 1898 to 1903, he was the decorator at the Kraków Municipal Theatre. He also designed playbills and posters and illustrated the first edition of Tamten, a play by Gabriela Zapolska.

In 1904, he returned to his native countryside, settled in Jasło, and taught drawing at the local gymnasium, where he painted a "Vision of Saint Francis" for the school chapel. Together with Włodzimierz Tetmajer (an associate from the Panorama Tatr) he created decorations for the parish church in Biecz. He was also involved in the cataloguing and preservation of local monuments. Following the Gorlice–Tarnów Offensive, he painted scenes of the destruction in the vicinity of Jasło.

He died in Jasło during the German occupation in 21 April 1917.
