= Biecz Synagogue =

Ancient synagogue in Biecz, Poland

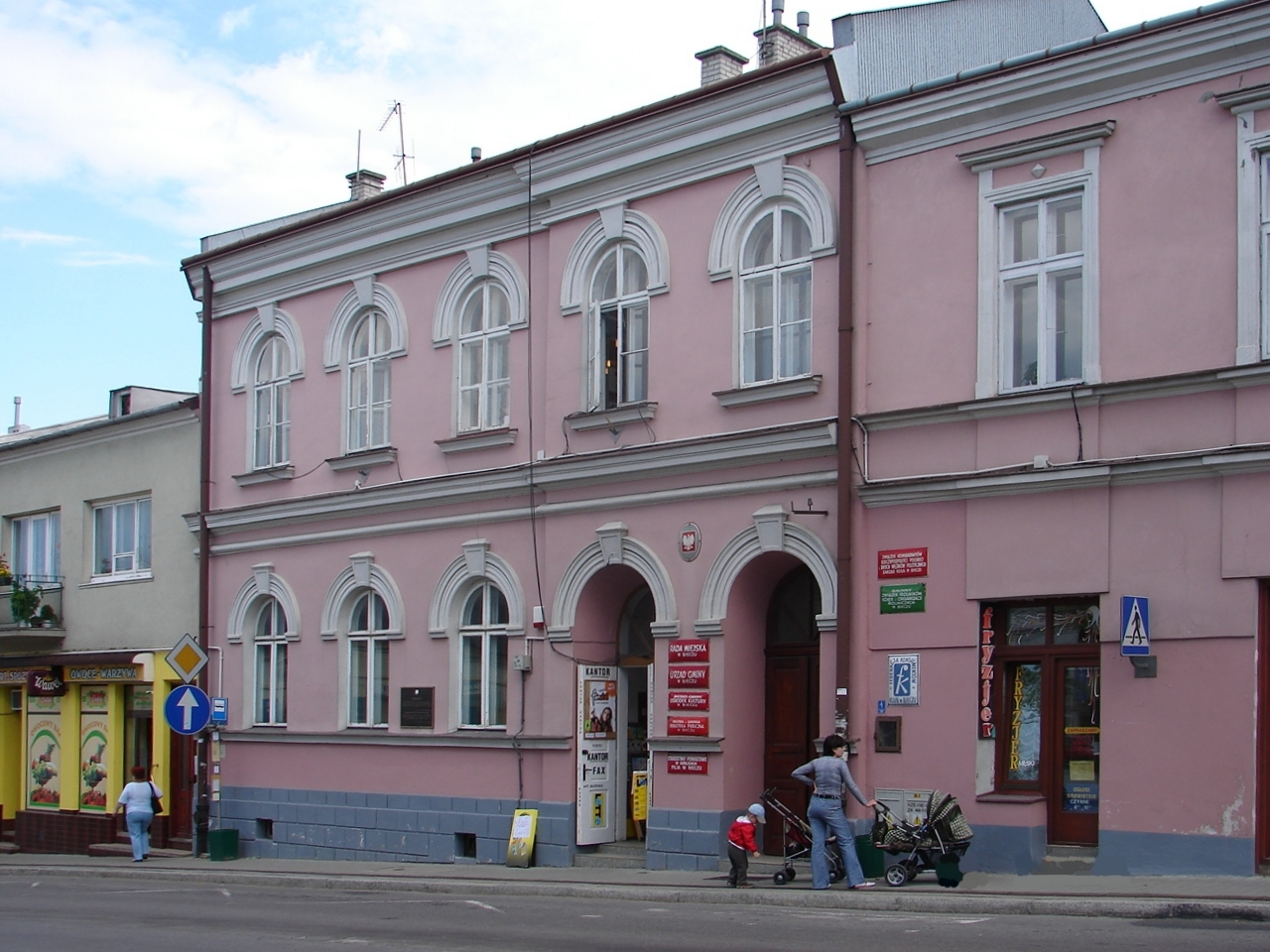
- The former synagogue in Biecz, now a public library.

- Location within Poland Location within Lesser Poland Voivodeship

Religion
- Affiliation: Judaism
- Status: Inactive

Location
- Location: Biecz, Poland
- Interactive map of Biecz Synagogue
- Coordinates: 49.73°N 21.25°E

Architecture
- Type: Synagogue
- Established: 1903; 123 years ago

The Biecz Synagogue is a former synagogue in Biecz, Poland. It is located on the main square of the town. Built in 1903, it is now used as a public library.

== History ==
The synagogue was built in 1903, with two separate entrances: one for men, which leads to the ground floor, and another one for women, which leads to the first floor. By the early 1930s, the town of Biecz was home to 500 Jews, making up 15% of the entire population.

During World War II, the Nazis established a Jewish ghetto around the synagogue. Eventually, they killed 150 Jews and deported the remaining Jews to the Bełżec extermination camp.

In the 1990s, the US-based Society of Jews from Biecz in New York added a commemorative plaque to the building.
