= Polonia sive de situ, populis, moribus, magistratibus et Republica regni Polonici libri duo =

1577 book by Marcin Kromer

Polonia sive de situ, populis, moribus, magistratibus et Republica regni Polonici libri duo is a book by Marcin Kromer, first published in Cologne in 1577 in Latin. The title in English is Poland or About the Geography, Population, Customs, Offices, and Public Matters of the Polish Kingdom in Two Volumes. The first Polish translation was made in 1853 (Polska, czyli o położeniu, obyczajach, urzędach Rzeczypospolitej Królestwa Polskiego).

== Contents ==
The book describes the topography, peoples, their habits and mores, as well as the political structure and administration of Poland in the late 16th century. There have been several editions of this book with varying contents. The main chapters include:

- I. Borders of Poland
- II. The shape of surface
- III. Mineral resources
- IV. Hydrography
- V. Climate, flora, fauna
- VI. Towns and villages

Some editions were accompanied by with maps (drawn by Marcin Kromer himself) of:

- Rivers of Poland
- Cities of Poland
- Province of Warmia
