= Tadeusz Ślawski =

Tadeusz Ślawski (1920-2008) was the author of several volumes about village history, life and traditions in his native Polish village Święcany and nearby regions. Many of these traditions had completely disappeared by the 21st century.

== Biography ==
Ślawski was born on 25 January 1920 in Święcany, Poland, and he died 4 November 2008. He came from a family of six and graduated from the elementary school in Święcany. After completing school, he went into employment of his uncle in Siary working at a petroleum well. When Germans took over the concern, he returned home refusing to work for the enemy. He joined the Armia Krajowa (Home Army) in 1942 and took active part against the Germans. The most remarkable incident occurred on 17 August 1944 in Swoszowa against the Tarnów Gestapo. T. Ślawski "Limba" was the first to open fire from a machine gun against a nine vehicle Gestapo convoy. This was the most successful action in the Podkarpacie area.

After the war, Ślawski graduated from the lyceum in Biecz, and in 1948 began studying history and philosophy at the Jagiellonian University in Kraków where he received a master's degree in history in 1953. He became permanently tied with Biecz through marriage in 1945 and dedicated his entire future life to this city with a long history. In 1966, he was awarded a doctorate from the Jagiellonian University. His thesis was "Production and Trade in Biecz in the 16th and 17th Centuries". He was one of the founders of the regional museum in Biecz and its director until his retirement in 1991.
