= Biecz =

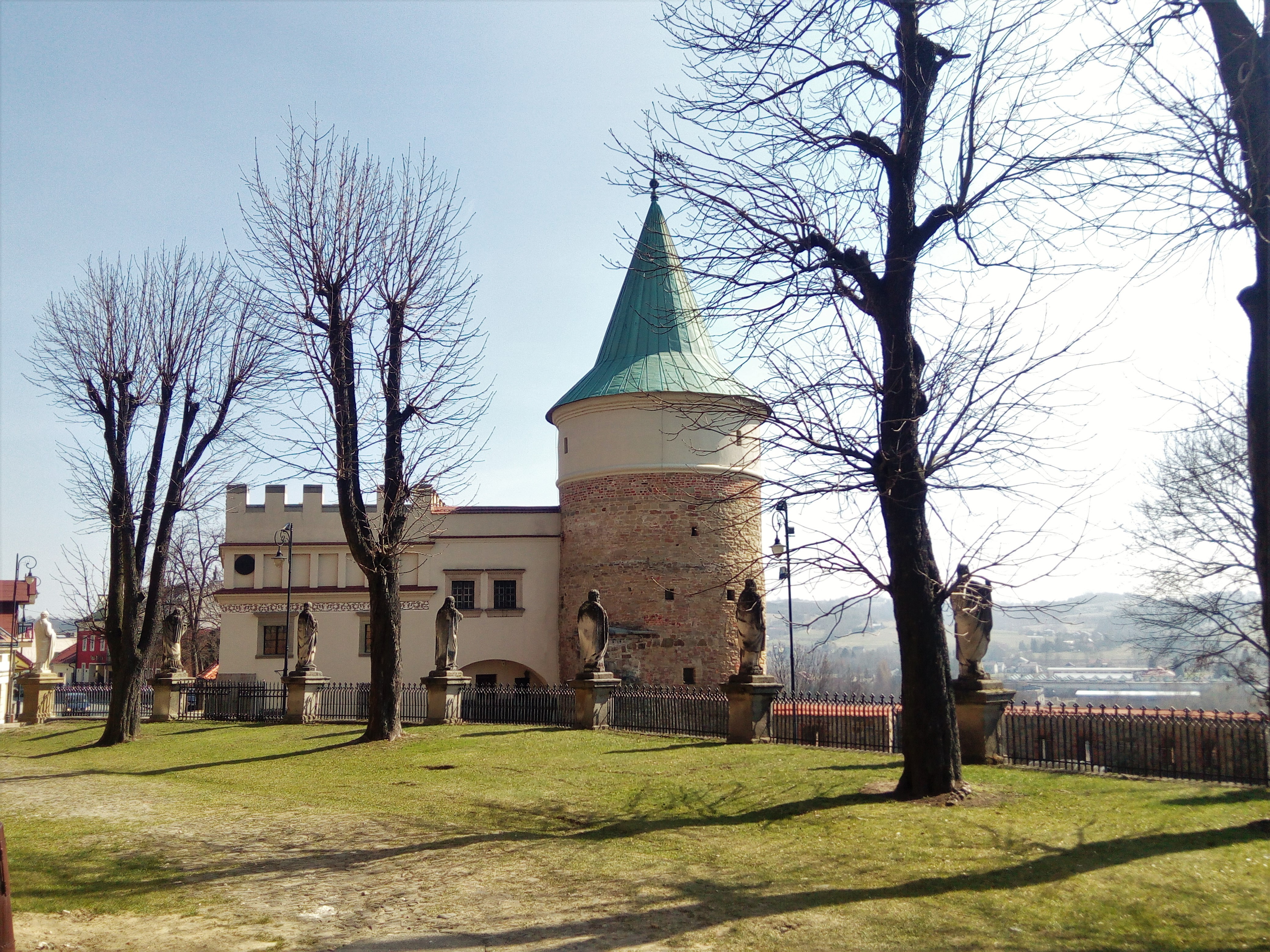
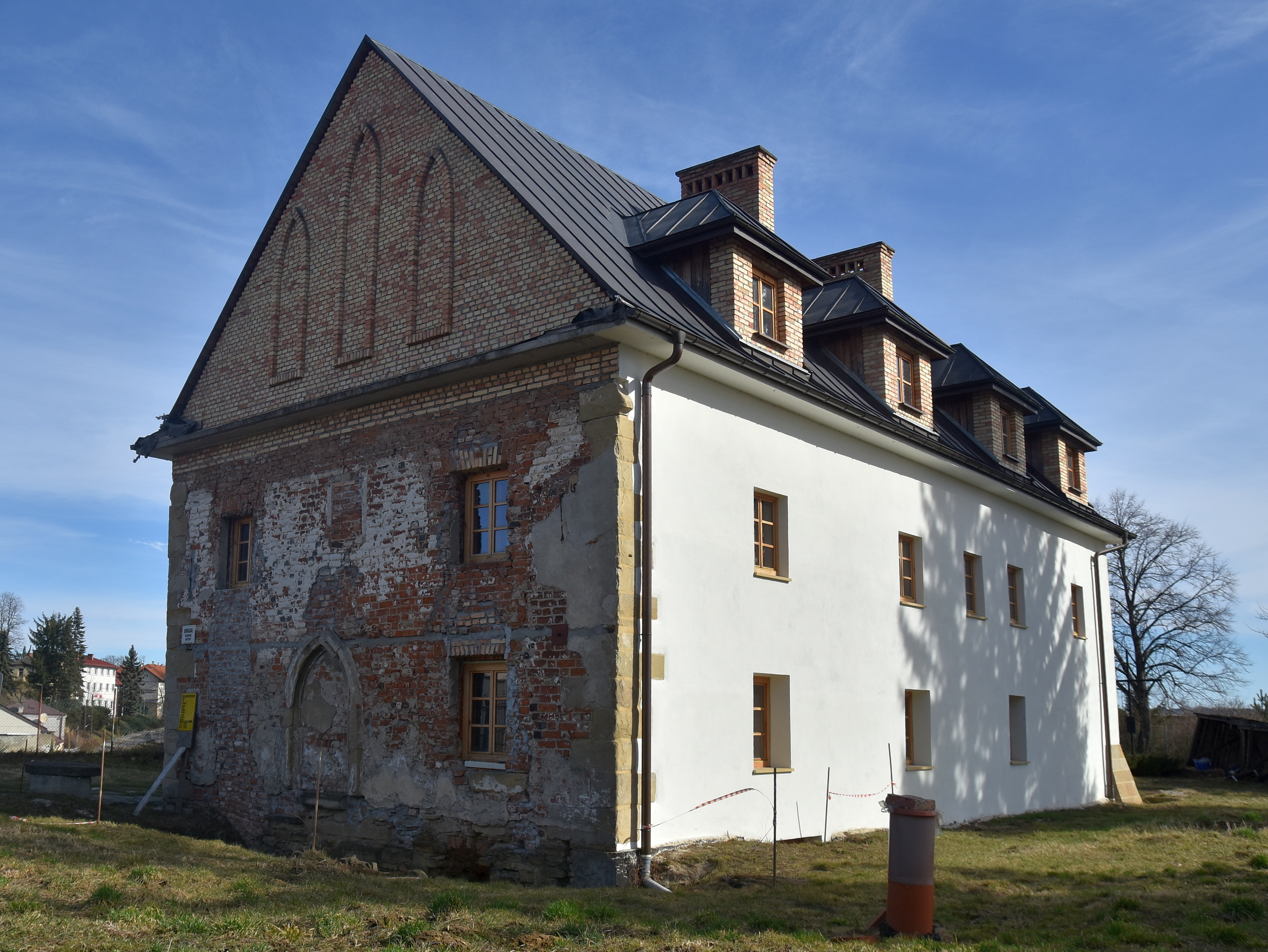
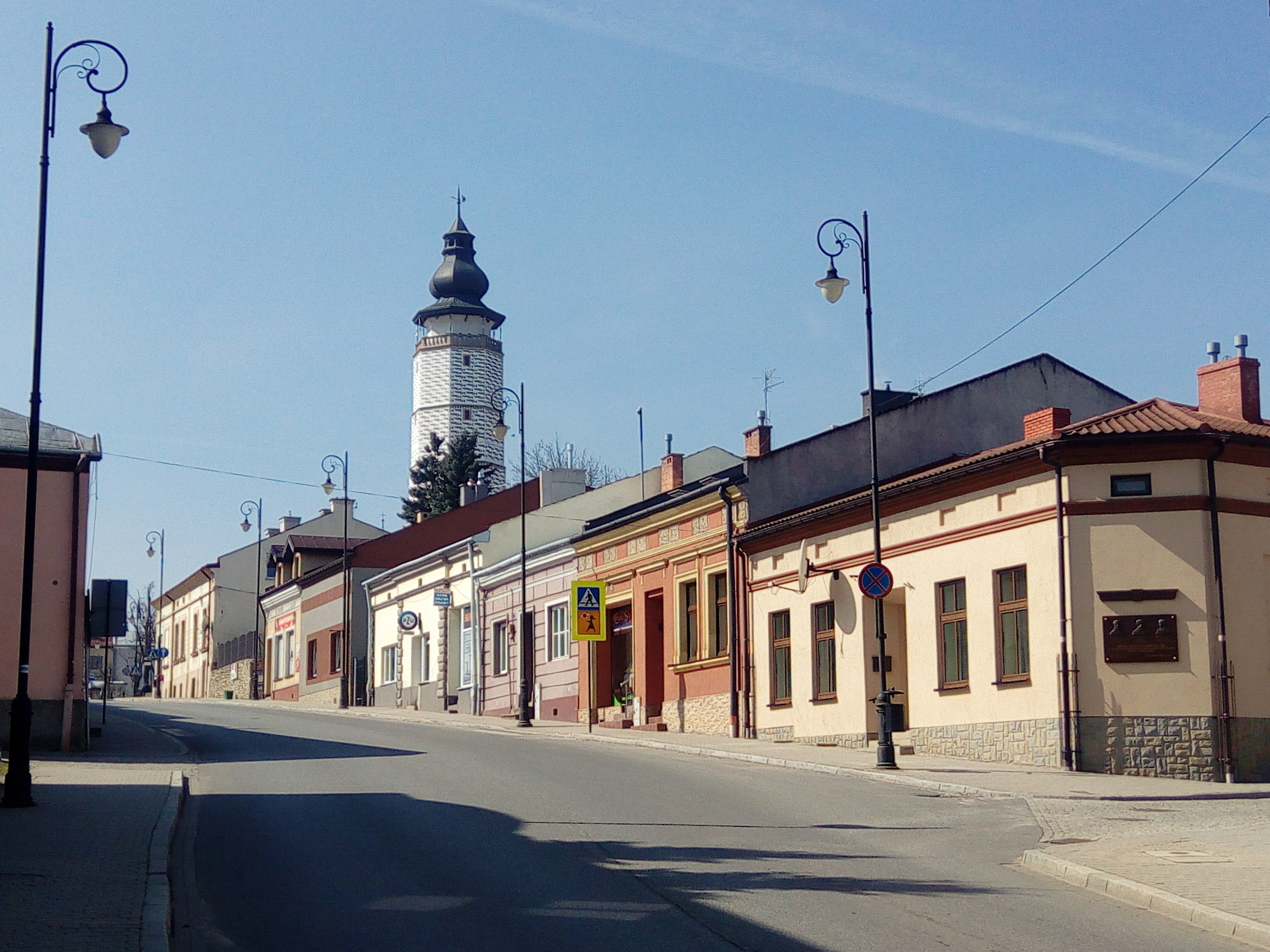
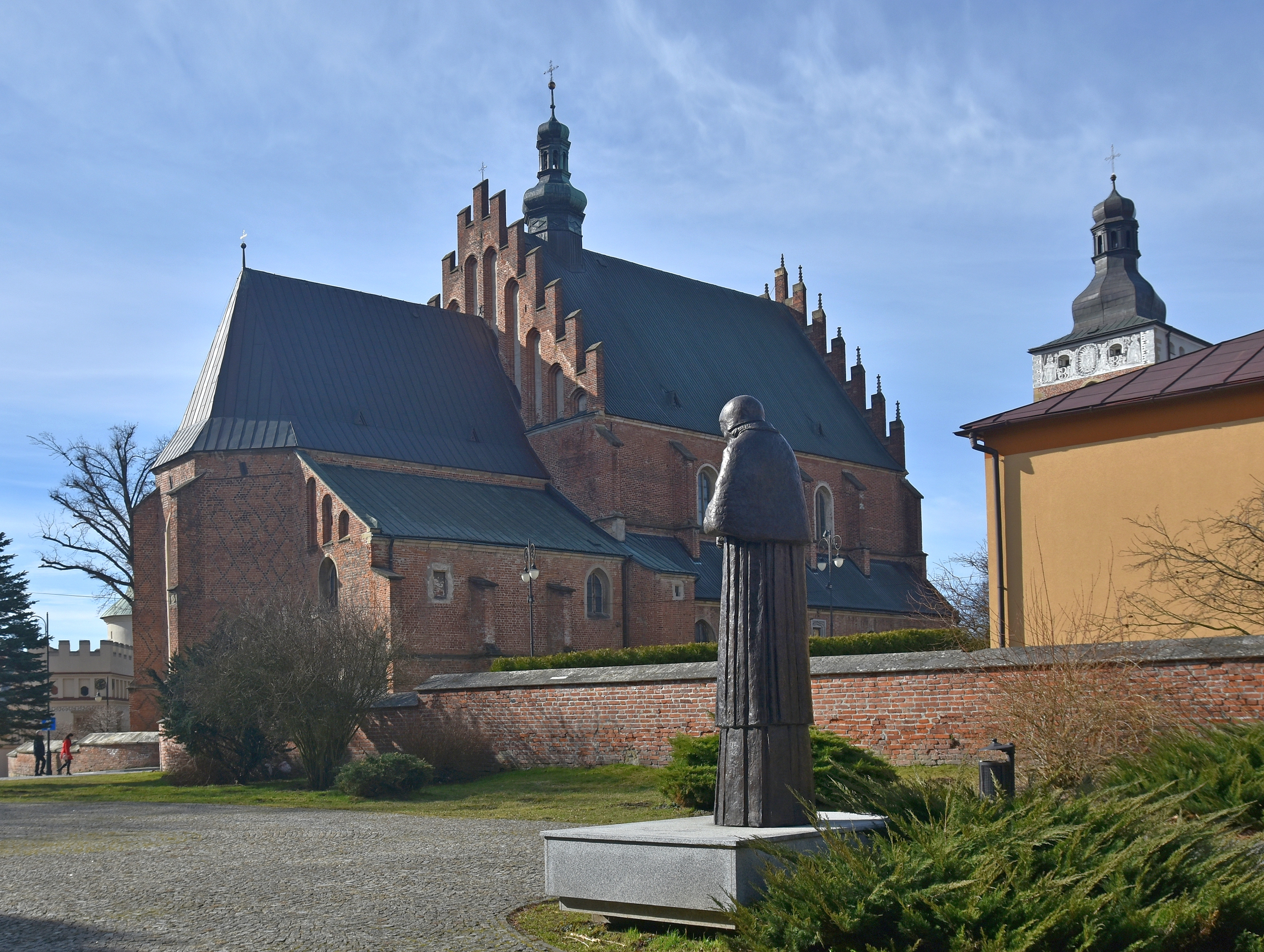
- From left to right: Museum with a turret tower, Holy Ghost Hospital from the 14th century, Grodzka Street and Town Hall, Corpus Christi Church

- Flag Coat of arms

- Location within Poland
- Coordinates: 49°43′55″N 21°15′45″E
- Country: Poland
- Voivodeship: Lesser Poland
- County: Gorlice
- Gmina: Biecz
- Established: 10th century
- Town rights: 1257

Government
  - Mayor: Mirosław Józef Wędrychowicz

Area
  - Total: 17.71 km^{2} (6.84 sq mi)
- Elevation: 281 m (922 ft)

Population (31 December 2021)
  - Total: 4,468
  - Density: 252/km^{2} (650/sq mi)
- Time zone: UTC+1 (CET)
  - Summer (DST): UTC+2 (CEST)
- Postal code: 38-340
- Area code: +48 13
- Vehicle plates: KGR
- Website: http://www.biecz.pl

Biecz (Polish pronunciation: ['bʲɛt͡ʂ]) is a town and municipality in southeastern Poland, in Lesser Poland Voivodeship, Gorlice County. It is in the Carpathian Mountains, in the Doły Jasielsko-Sanockie, by the Ropa River. Due to its rich history, it is often referred to as "little Kraków" or the "pearl of the Carpathians". The many preserved medieval city walls and buildings have also given rise to the nickname "Polish Carcassonne" for both Biecz and the town of Szydłów.

By the mid-16th century, the city was one of the largest in Poland. Being a royal city, Biecz enjoyed an economic and social Renaissance during the 14th and 15th centuries which tapered off into a gradual decline starting during the 17th century. Today, it is a small town with a number of historical monuments.

== Etymology ==
The earliest mentions in historical sources give the name of the town as Beyech, Begech, Begecz, Begesz, Beyecz, Beecz, Beycz, Byecz and Beiech. This allows to establish that the original form of the name was Biejecz, apparently a regular possessive adjective derived from the diminutive personal name Biejek (not attested, but easily reconstructable from Biejecz and perhaps Biejków). The age of the town makes further derivation from Bieniedzikt improbable, leading linguists to hypothesize that the ultimate source is Biezdziad or other Old Slavic name beginning in Bie-. In the 13th century, the nominative stem was levelled to the oblique stem Biejcz- (e.g. Loc. w Biejczu "in Biejecz"), giving Biejcz without stem alternations (attested as late as the 17th century) and then the current form, Biecz.

Apart from that, there are a plethora of other theories, including obvious folk etymologies, linking the name e.g. to a Carpathian tribe called Biessi, mentioned by Ptolemy; a legendary bandit called Becz; the Beskids; and a west and south-west Slavic dialectal word meaning "borough", attested e.g. as Beč/Беч in Serbo-Croatian, borrowed into Romani (Bech) and Hungarian (Bécs).

=== Heraldry ===
The Biecz coat of arms depicts Saints Peter and Paul on a field of red. St. Paul, on the right, holds a sword, while St. Peter holds the Keys of Heaven. Between them is the capital letter B, a reference to the city name.

The coat of arms dates back to the 16th century, when official seals depicting the images of Saints Peter and Paul and the letter B first appeared. The seals were used with more regularity during the 17th and 18th centuries. On 12 July 1990, the Municipal Council officially adopted the use of the coat of arms.

== History ==
The area of Biecz has been settled periodically since the Neolithic period, though the first mentions of a named settlement date back to the 11th century. This early medieval town was approximately 500 metres (1,600 ft) from the modern one. By the 12th century, the town had become a castellany, and by the mid-14th century, it had been granted rights based on Magdeburg Law.

Biecz enjoyed a cultural and economic renaissance during the 14th and 15th centuries. Beginning in the 17th century, the town was beset by a number of natural disasters, including flooding, fires, and a plague which killed all but 30 inhabitants. The town suffered heavy population losses during World War II, including a public massacre of 200 local Jews in the market square in 1942.

=== Prehistory ===
Biecz is situated in an area which was inhabited as early as the Neolithic period, or about 4500 BCE. Stone artifacts dating to this period have been excavated within Biecz proper and the surrounding area. A hoard of copper alloy weapons and jewellery dating from the early Bronze Age was found in a bog in the vicinity of Biecz in the nineteenth century. Now in the British Museum, the hoard is famous for its rare conical helmet or Kegelhelm. During the late Bronze Age and early Iron Age, the area was home to the Lusatian culture. Pottery fragments were uncovered during archaeological work at the castle in 1961. Excavated Byzantine and Roman coins dating from the 2nd to the 5th centuries indicate that the area was part of an important trade route for these empires.

=== Early Middle Ages ===
A castle was erected as early as the 9th century, a small settlement quickly developing around its perimeter. This early castle was demolished by King Casimir IV Jagiellon in the 13th century and replaced with a much larger structure, now one of three surviving castles in the area. Biecz is first referenced by name in church documents written by Thietmar of Merseburg c. 1012–1018. In 1184, Casimir II the Just gave the land as tithes to St. Florian of Kraków. Documents dating to 1243 and 1257 make reference to specific castellans: Nicolaus de Beycz and Bronisius de Begech.

The castle was a strategic military stronghold due to its location near the Polish border. It served as a preparation area for attacks on enemy states and a rallying point for forces resisting invasion. The stronghold also served as a center for trade due to its position at the crossroads between east–west and north–south trade routes between Red Ruthenia and Hungary.

=== Magdeburg rights ===
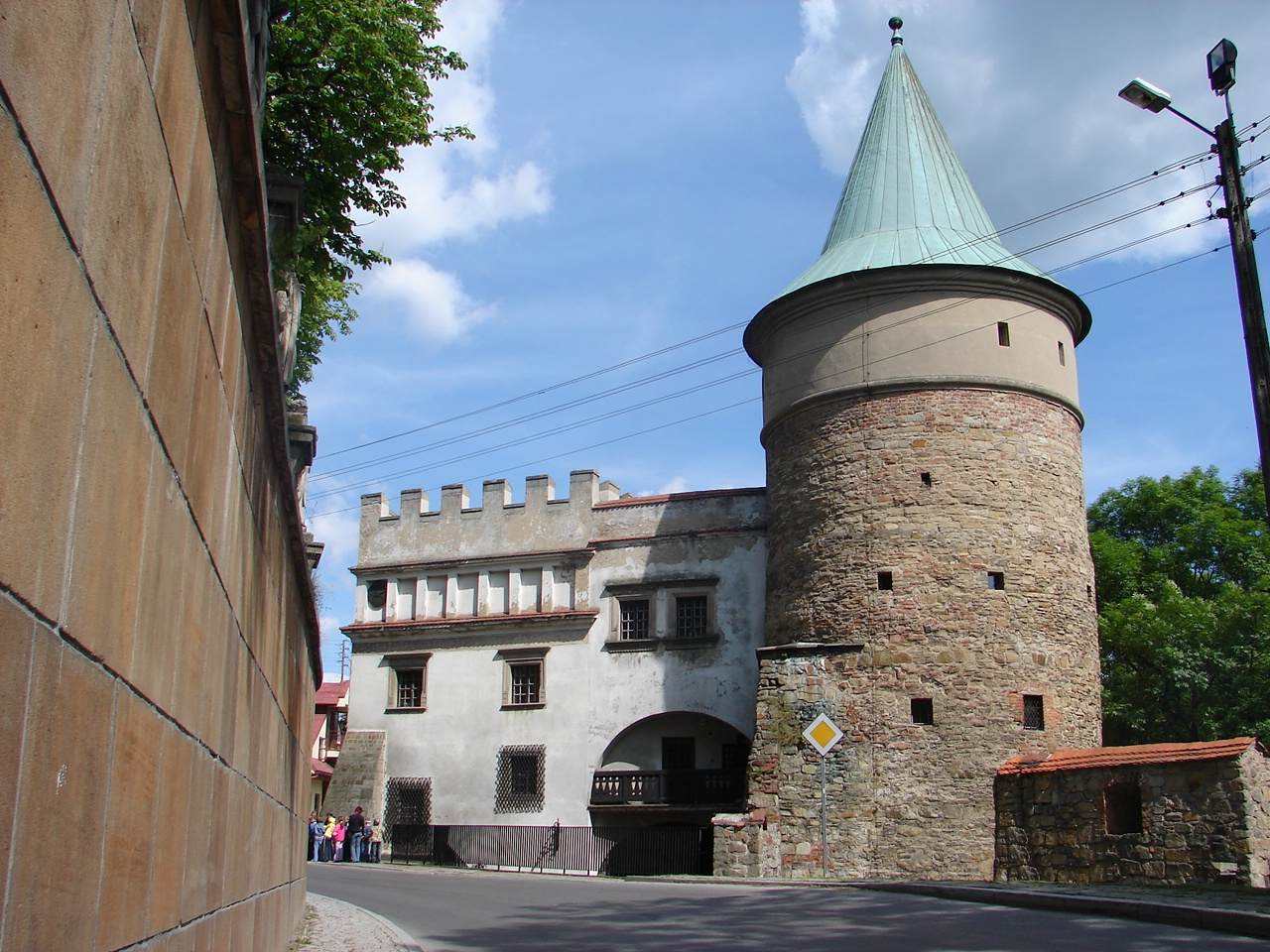
Councillors' turret tower, part of the Town Museum

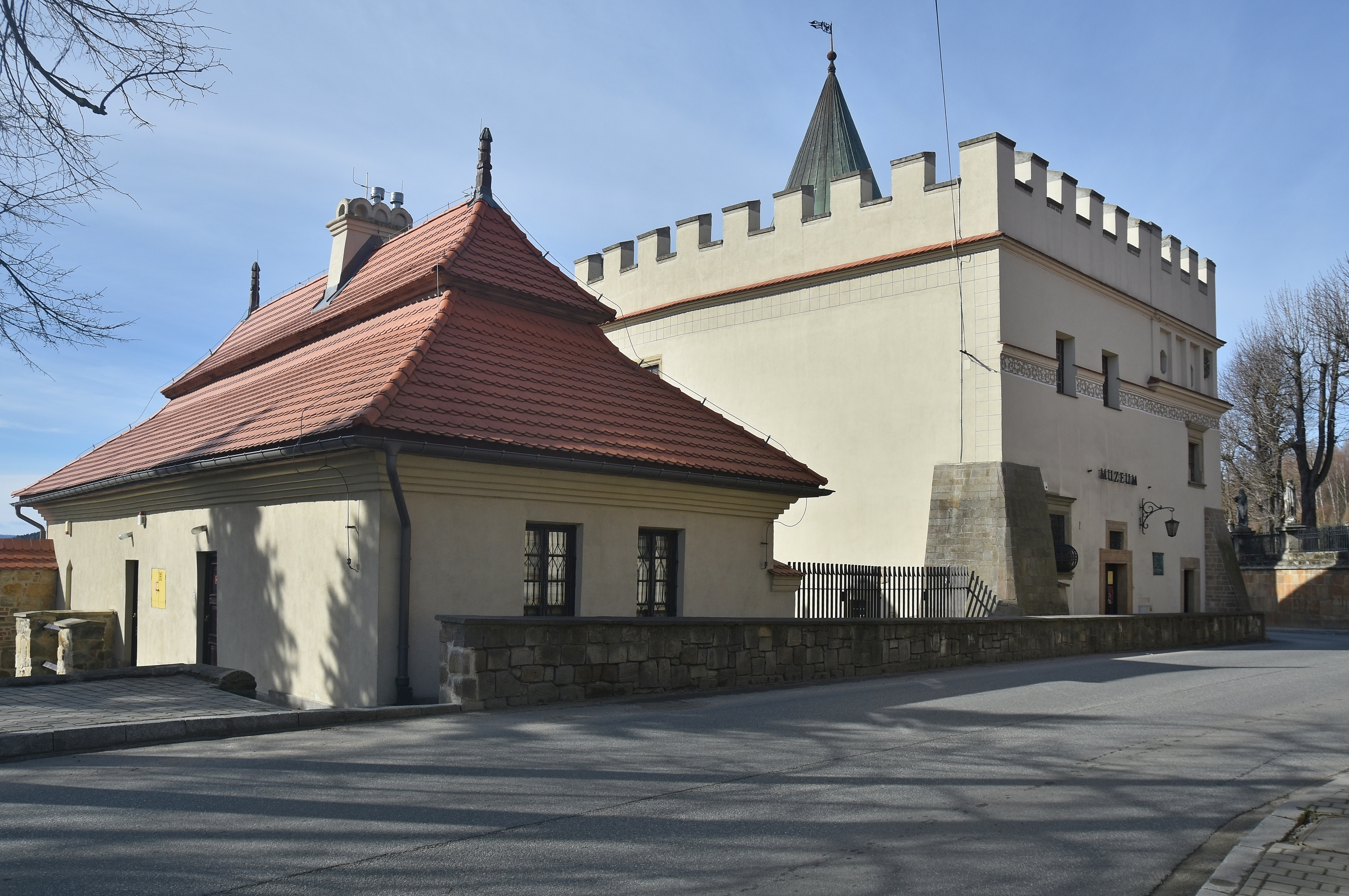
Town Museum, Barian-Rokicki House

Biecz was granted its Magdeburg rights around the year 1257 CE, probably by Prince Bolesław V the Chaste of Kraków. The exact year is unknown, as the royal edict granting these rights has not been preserved. These rights were confirmed by King Casimir III the Great in 1363, and then later by Queen Jadwiga. Trade relations with Bardejov across the Carpathians were also formalized during the 14th century.

During the late 13th century, King Wenceslaus II gifted the town to Jan Muskata, bishop of Kraków, in exchange for the territory where he would later found Nowy Sącz. According to contemporary documents, the transfer of power occurred on 24 March 1303 in Prague.

During the fall of 1306, ownership of the town and castle were peacefully transferred to the control of Władysław I the Elbow-high. From this point forward, the town and municipality were under the control of the Polish crown. Władysław I based his campaign to unify Poland from the castle of Biecz from September 1311 to April 1312. Due to the importance granted to the city during this period, Biecz was initially considered the capital city of Poland.

Initially the town was protected by earthworks and ditches. Walls were first constructed during the 14th century, as evidenced by a royal edict issued by King Władysław II Jagiełło (Jogaila) in 1399 ordering all able-bodied men to assist in the expansion and repair of the city walls. The walls were extended in the 16th century and again in the 17th, when seventeen towers were constructed to aid in the fortification and protection of the town.

=== Golden age ===
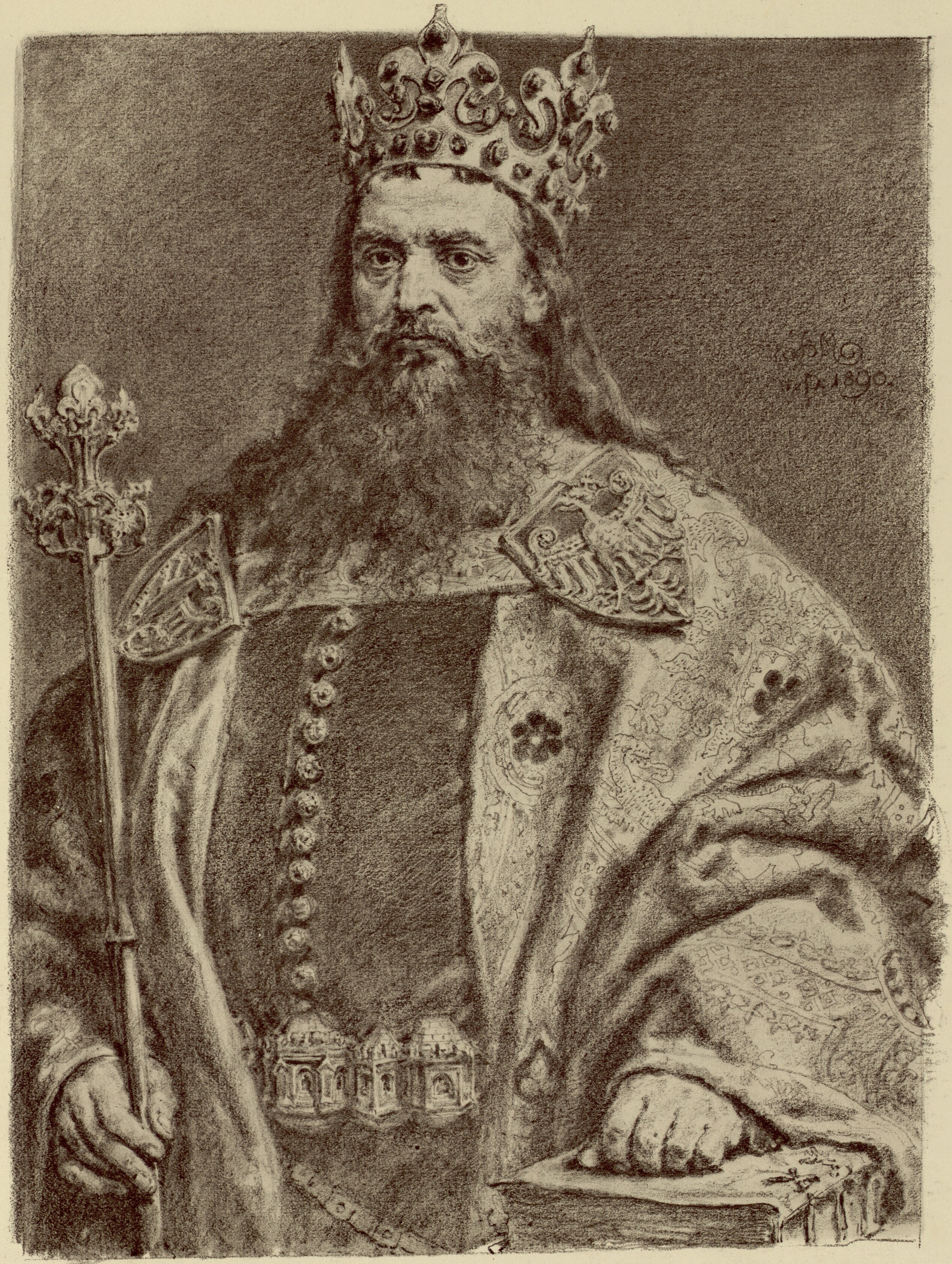
King Casimir the Great, who was greatly interested in the economic development of Biecz, and under whose rule the city flourished.

King Casimir III the Great took great interest in the city. In 1361 he gave orders for the construction of weighing scales and textile mills, and established a number of fairs, which were major sources of income. In addition, he granted all Biecz business an exemption from taxation and tariffs, as well as economic benefit from surrounding villages.

Biecz flourished under Jagiellonian rule. The crown's encouragement of growth and trade, as well as the town's favorable location, were major influences on Biecz's rapid growth during this period. Under the rule of King Casimir IV Jagiellon, the town built its first municipal water supply. Inhabitants were also granted a number of privileges, such as relief from duties on various imported commodities. Additionally, merchants entering Polish territory were required to pass through Biecz, wherein taxes and other import tariffs were levied. This practice was established by Louis I of Hungary in 1372 along the Hungarian-Red Ruthenian trade route.

Economic development prompted rapid population growth. By the end of the 14th century, Biecz had become one of the largest cities in all of Poland, with a population of over 3,000 in the city and its suburbs.

As a castellany, Biecz was not only entrusted with defensive responsibilities, but also served as judicial, administrative, and economic center for southern part of Kraków Voivodeship. After a lull in economic and population growth in the latter half of the 14th century, the judiciary and administration of the region were reorganized. The region of Kraków, or Kraków Voivodeship was established, and was further split into six powiats (districts), one of which was the large district of Biecz. Biecz was then designated a judicial center, and was home to two different court systems. Kraków, Nowy Sącz, and Biecz were the locations of the high courts that dealt with the enforcement of the Magdeburg laws as established in 1374 by the Privilege of Košice.

Little is known about the establishment of the Biecz starostwo during the late 14th century. Nothing is known about the first recorded starosta but his name: Drago. The starostwo were Crown lands administered by the starosta, and established mainly for economic purposes as the Crown considered revenues generated by these administrative regions a significant source of income. The Biecz starostwo had a strong economic base; by 1581 it encompassed 23 villages and Crown-operated folwarks. Until 1641 the starosta had an office in the Franciscan monastery; after 1641 his office was moved to a designated administrative building.

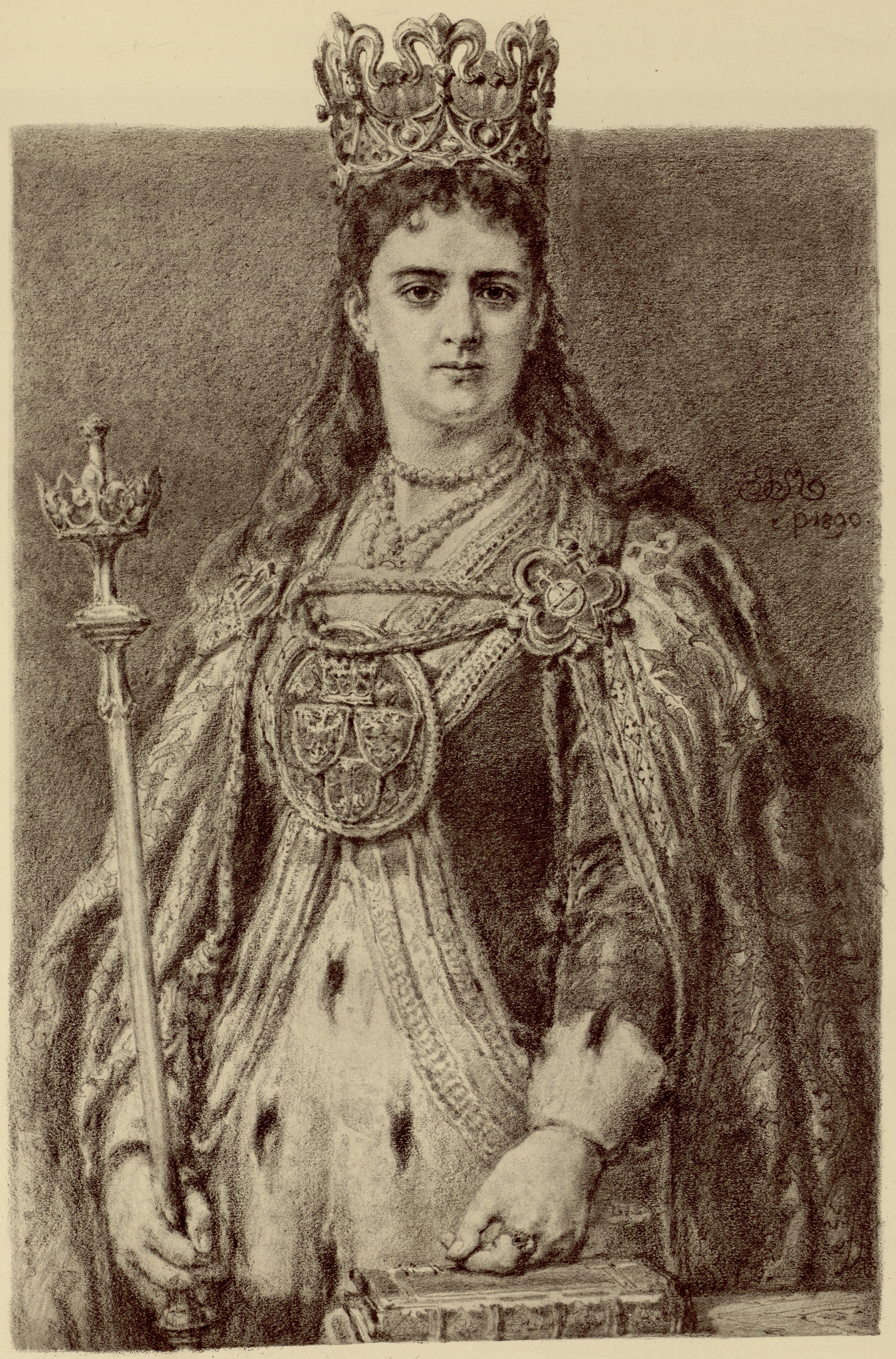
Queen Jadwiga, the founder of the Hospital of the Holy Ghost and patron saint of Biecz.

In 1624, the reformed Franciscan order arrived in Biecz from Zakliczyn, where a substantial reformation had recently occurred under the guidance of Friar Hipolit Łowicjan and Father Piotr Zielonacki. In 1651 the Franciscan monastery was moved from its original location on the Ropa River to a new location closer to the city center.

Numerous public and private buildings were built during the 15th and 16th centuries. On 25 July 1395, Queen Jadwiga issued building orders for the Szpital św. Ducha (Hospital of the Holy Ghost). The writ appropriated a nearby folwark, several fish ponds, and the remnants of a plaza that had been destroyed by fire in 1388. Funded entirely by tax revenue, the hospital's budget was the largest in the country.

Over the years, many churches have been located in Biecz, the most ever being seven within the city limits. The most prominent of these is Corpus Christi Church (Kościół Bożego Ciała). The oldest surviving structures date back to 1480, but the register of monuments of the Kingdom of Poland show that construction had already begun by 1326. The main nave was constructed during the 15th century and completed by 1519. The side chapels were built between 1521 and 1560, and the main altar was added in 1604.

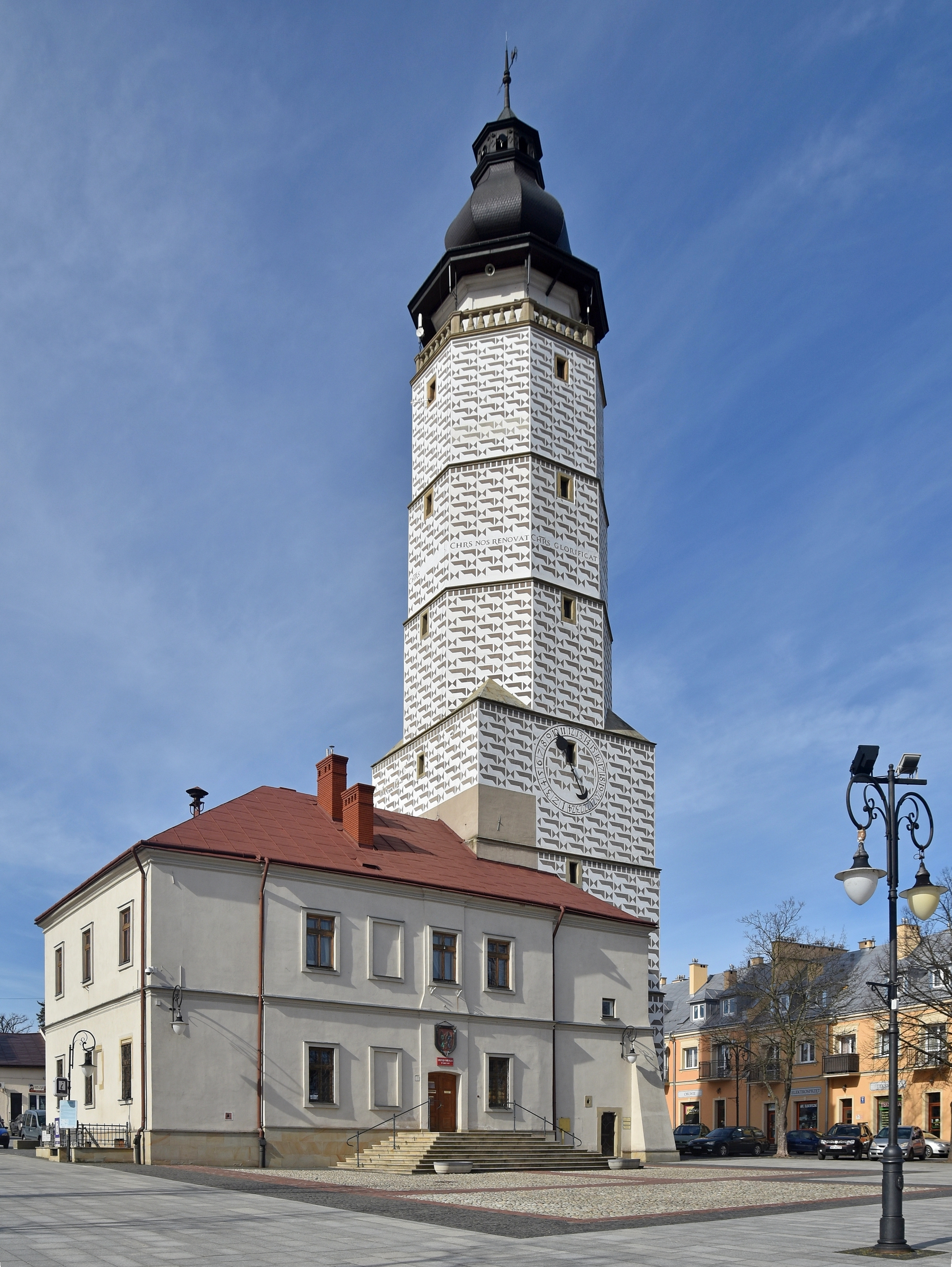
City hall (Ratusz). The bell tower was constructed in 1569, while the rest of the structure was built between 1569 and 1580.

Another important monument constructed during this period is City Hall. The original bell tower was constructed in 1569, and the rest of the structure was built between 1569 and 1580. The structure was built with funds donated by Marcin Kromer. Once construction on the tower was completed, the tradition of trumpeting the hejnał was begun. The hejnał was played every morning, noon, and evening, coinciding with the closing of the city gates, as well as in times of emergency.

In 1523, the Dom Barianów-Rokickich was built. The building was owned by Marcin Kromer and served as a pharmacy until the 17th century. Other important period buildings include the 1519 Kromer House, which never actually had anything to do with Marcin Kromer, and the Castle, built in the first half of the 16th century.

Biecz was a royal city, and the center of local administrative, judicial, and military authority from the 12th century until 1783. In the 17th century, the district of Biecz encompassed eleven cities and 264 villages, as well as three castles, the royal court, and several royal residences. Kings from both the Piast and Jagiellon dynasties made use of these royal residences. The royal residences remained in use by Polish monarchs until John II Casimir Vasa, who passed through the city while on his campaign to drive the Swedes from Poland.

The castle served as a center of economic exchange for many centuries, mainly due to its favorable location at the intersection of north–south and east–west trade routes.

In 1505, Alexander Jagiellon strengthened trade relations with Hungary. As a result, the majority of Hungarian exports to Polish territories and beyond were sent through Biecz. These goods include iron, copper, lead, salt, wool, and large quantities of Hungarian wine. Initially this wine was a poor trade good, as the liquor was so expensive that only the magnates could afford to buy it. Over time, however, it became a more common drink, and increasing quantities were exported. On 17 January 1618, the wine cellars built by Casimir the Great had a stock of 331 barrels of Hungarian wine.

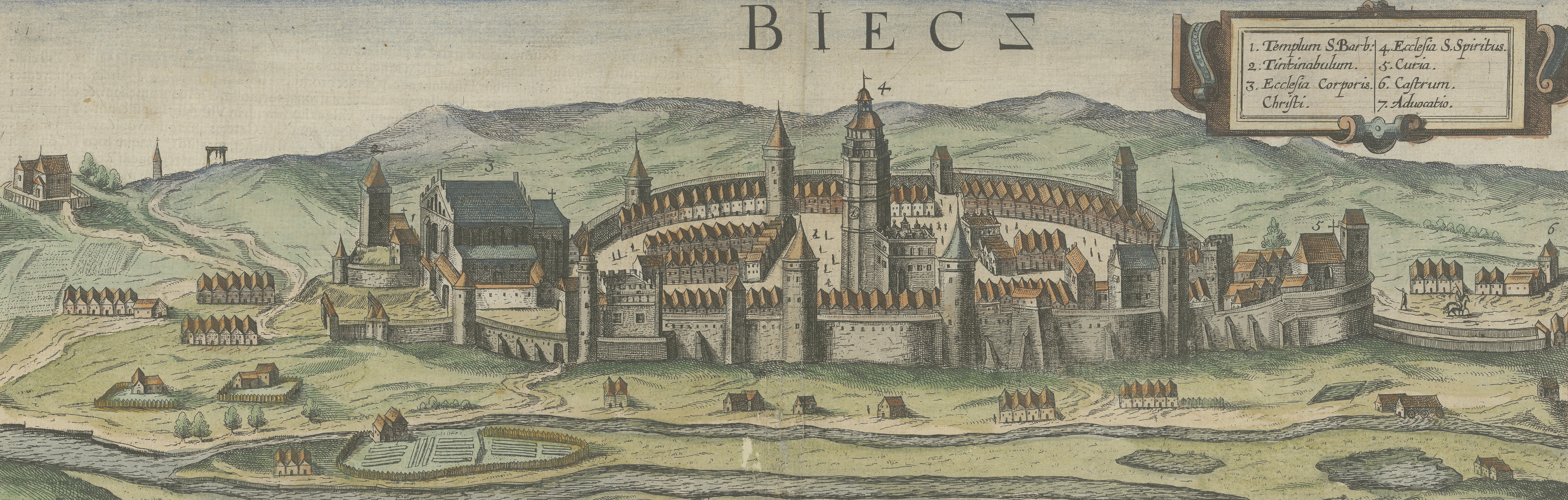
Biecz, circa 1617, as depicted by Georg Braun and Franz Hogenberg.

As the major defensive stronghold of the region, Biecz was required to combat manifestations of lawlessness. Marauders would frequently attack trade caravans, their major targets being those carrying large quantities of Hungarian wine. The issue was so widespread that the local sejm designated a special committee to litigate the issue.

As attacks on merchants increased in frequency and severity, the government increased penalties for these types of crimes. The punishment was torture, usually flagellation, followed by execution. Afterwards, the head of the criminal would be mounted on a pole at the city gate to serve as a warning to others. The bodies of highwaymen were, according to tradition, hung from gibbets, which can be seen in the Hogenberg etching above. Though no longer in use, these gibbets can still be seen today.

Biecz executioners also performed executions in nearby villages for a fee. According to financial records, in the year 1450 executioners were sent to the towns of Jasło, Rymanów, Dukla, Dębowiec, Rzeszów, and Wojnicz.

Historical population
Year	Pop.	Year	Pop.
1398	~3000	1921	3673
mid-16th century	~3700	1931	4055
1626	~1617	1939	4268
1695	~1030	1944	5973
1784	1783	1946	3947
1815	1770	1958	4066
1850	2330	1972	4145
1880	2930	1991	4005
1900	3180	1996	4965
1914	3825	2006	4648
		2021	4468
Source: T. Ślawski, Biecz i okolice

The sheer number of executions enacted gave rise to the popular legend that there existed an executioners' school in Biecz. It is likely that this is the invention of a 19th-century author, as trade schools did not exist during the Middle Ages. Nevertheless, the legend is a popular one, and some historical scholars have even devoted time to study the possibility.

As the population grew, so did the variety of trade goods and handicrafts produced in the city. In the 14th century, there were 30 different types of goods produced in the city, most of which are cloth or canvas goods. Economic prosperity gave rise to a mentality that valued education, which prompted the 1528 opening of a new school building. In the 15th and 16th centuries, 150 Bieczan students studied at the Jagiellonian University in Kraków, then still known as Akademia Krakowska. Most of these students returned to Biecz after completing their studies.

Biecz was home to a number of artists, painters, poets, and writers, including Jan Matejko and Stanisław Wyspiański. The first panoramic painting of Biecz was created in 1617 by Georg Braun and Franz Hogenberg. Another famous depiction is J. Janson's copperplate Widok ogólny Biecza ("General view of Biecz"), which appears in Regni Poloniæ Ducatus Lituaniæ novissima descriptio (1659). Biecz was also the subject of artworks created by several artists, including Tadeusz Rybkowski, Józef Mehoffer, and Helena Krajewska. Biecz was the subject of Miron Białoszewski's tapestry Średniowieczny gobelin o Bieczu.

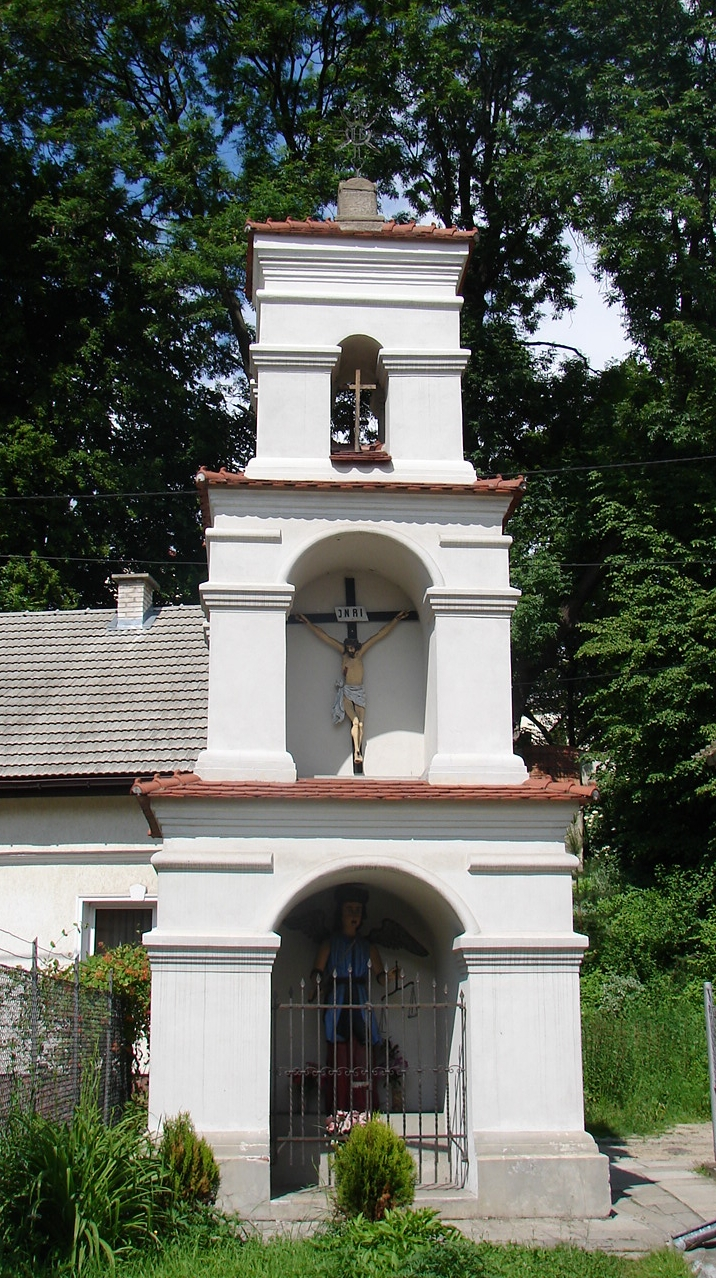
The chapel of Michael the Archangel, built in 1721 as a monument to the victims of the great plague that decimated the population of Biecz.

The economic development of Biecz resulted in a population boom. A census conducted by the judiciary from 1388 to 1398 lists the names of 515 heads of households. Taking into account that contemporary families consisted on average of six people, it is believed that Biecz and its suburbs had at least 3,000 residents. By the mid-16th century, Biecz had a population of 3,700, the highest population the city achieved during the Middle Ages. Starting in the 17th century, Biecz went into a decline, its population slipping to approximately 1800 people in the first half of the 17th century, and then to 462 inhabitants in 1662.

=== Decline ===
Starting in the mid-17th century, the city began to decline due to the stationing of foreign troops, alterations in trade routes, and numerous natural disasters. Further devastation was caused by the Deluge, a series of disastrous wars with Sweden that left the Polish–Lithuanian Commonwealth in ruins. The invading Swedes razed houses, farms, peasant buildings, hospitals, and three wooden churches on the outskirts of the city.

The wine trade, which had sustained the city as trade waned, began to decline. Contemporary record-keeping shows a significant reduction in the stock of wine in the middle of the 17th century. As time went on, the wine trade dwindled further before eventually disappearing completely.

On 4 April 1770, Kierkor, the commander of a troop of 100 cavalry, mounted an attack from Biecz against the Imperial Russian Army in Siepietnica under the command of Iwan Drewicz (Russian: Иван Григорьевич Древич). The cavalry were overwhelmed, and the Russian forces pursued the retreating troops and plundered Biecz.

The golden age of Biecz ended with the partition of Poland, after which the city was under Austrian rule. After the 1783 liquidation of the District of Biecz, the eastern portion of city hall, which was devoted to district administration, was demolished between 1815 and 1840.

By 1787, trade good production had declined such that there remained only eight trade guilds. The most prosperous of the remaining trades was weaving, with approximately thirty workshops. Another surviving craft was shoemaking, with fourteen workshops. The shoemaking profession soon disappeared, however, as industrialization allowed for mass production of much cheaper product.

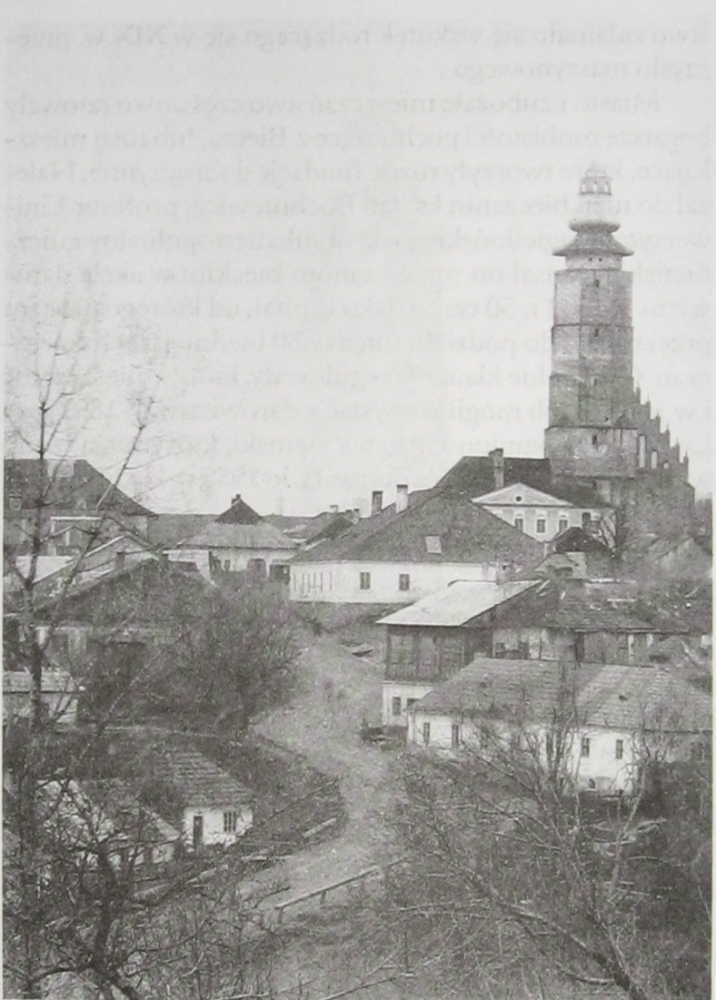
Biecz, as seen from the West, in 1900

At the beginning of the 16th century, Biecz was one of the largest Polish cities both in area and population. Beginning in the middle of that century, however, Biecz fell victim to a number of natural disasters which devastated both its population and infrastructure. In 1543, 110 inhabitants died from a plague; a second plague in 1572 claimed 1,500 victims. In 1600 Biecz suffered yet another plague, which struck again in 1622. This plague struck the workshops, nearly wiping out the tradesman population. 52 craftsmen survived. The same occurred in the next plague, which struck in 1652. In 1721, Biecz suffered what is now known as the great plague, which devastated the populace and spared approximately thirty people.

In 1776, the ruling Habsburg dynasty sold the city to the Siemieńscy family, effectively revoking Biecz's status as a royal city. Initially the new administration provided a certain stability. However, in 1783, the city was forced to defend itself against invaders, forcing the administrative and judicial branches of government to shut down. The last Biecz castle still in service as a military stronghold fell to the invaders, who laid siege to the city. Effectively cut off from communication with the rest of the Austrian partition, and severed from the traditional Hungarian trade routes, the city withstood the invasion solely due to the recent renovation and strengthening of the city walls.

=== 1850–1914 ===
Maksymilian Fajans, Biecz nad rzeką Ropą, 1875–1883

Biecz began to recover economically beginning in the late 19th century. During this period, the petrochemical industry began to develop in the vicinity, which contributed to a number of personal fortunes through the years. In 1879, the first oil well was constructed in the Hart neighborhood, northwest of Biecz. Devastated areas were rebuilt and rejuvenated with money from these newly made oil fortunes. One of these nouveau riche, Father Jan Bochniewicz, established a charitable foundation with 50,000 PLN initial capital, a percentage of which was earmarked for distribution among the fifty poorest inhabitants of the city. The foundation survived until 1958.

The economic recovery and the inflow of capital to Biecz contributed positively to improving the quality of life. In 1882, Biecz constructed its first railroad station, and in 1889, its first credit union. Slowly education and culture returned to the city. In 1891 a new parochial school building was constructed, and in 1912 an all-girls school was opened. The 19th century brought with it an increased awareness of the historical value of buildings, and a subsequent increase in the conservation and protection of historic monuments. As a result, Biecz soon became the focus of interest of many art historians, professors, and conservators.

On 12 May 1903, a great fire broke out in Biecz, razing half of the city. According to historical documents, destroyed buildings included twenty Jewish stores, thirty Catholic homes, the tax collector's offices, a pharmacy, the newly built Synagogue, and old city hall. In total, 600 residents were left without homes.

In 1898, the city's public library, named after Tadeusz Kosciuszko, was opened and quickly became a cultural center. The original library was completely destroyed in the fire, but shortly thereafter was rebuilt and stocked with approximately 8,000 volumes.

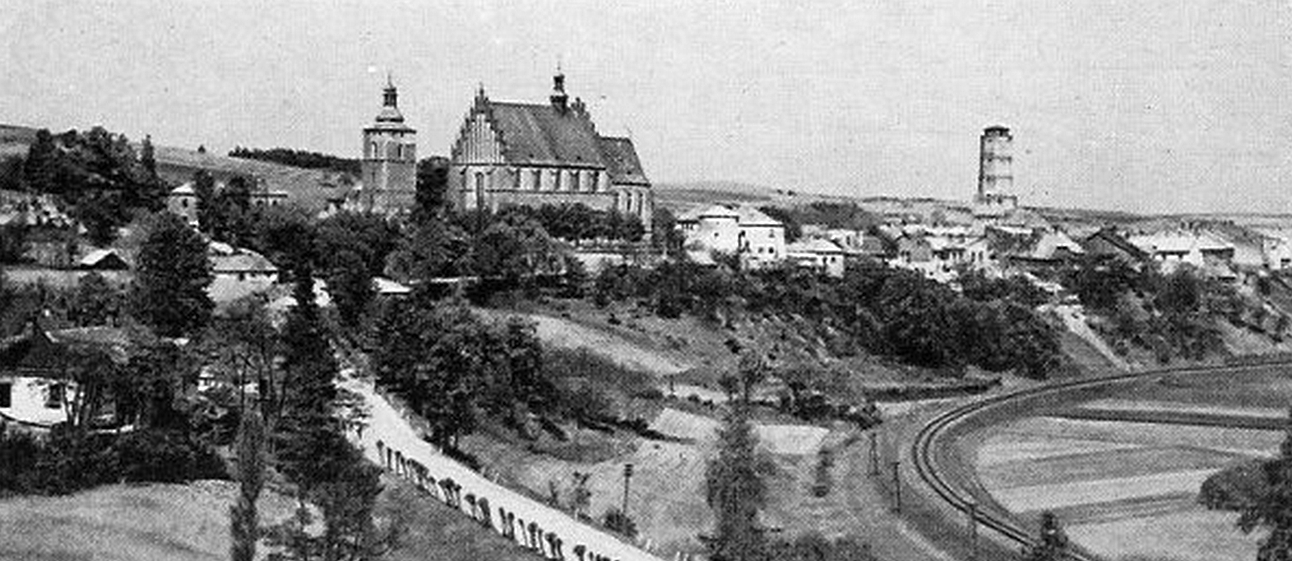
Biecz, circa 1905, after the great fire.

=== World Wars ===
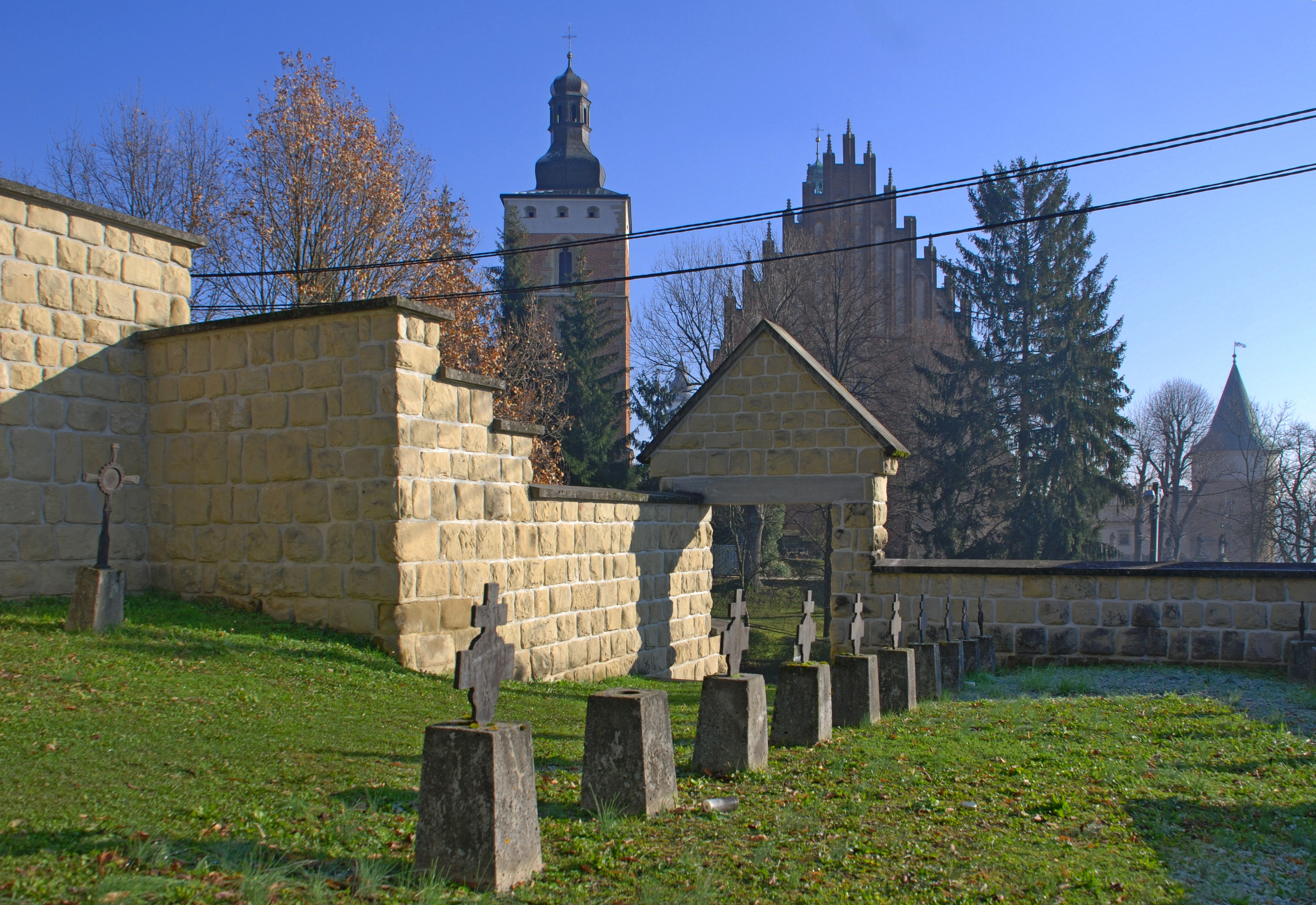
Cemetery no. 106

While World War I had little impact on the city proper, a number combatants who participated in the Gorlice–Tarnów Offensive are buried in cemeteries throughout the municipality.

There are five numbered cemeteries in Biecz wherein soldiers of World War I are buried:

- cemetery no. 105, in Harcie, by the road to the communal cemetery.
- cemetery no. 106, on Ulica Bochniewicza, was recently restored.
- cemetery no. 107, along Ulica Tysiąclecia, was originally a Jewish cemetery which was destroyed during World War II.
- cemetery no. 108, by the Franciscan cloisters.
- cemetery no. 109, on Ulica Parkowej.

The interwar period heralded new growth in Biecz. A number of societies were founded during this period, including the Związek Młodzieży Polskiej Polish Youth Union (1920) and the Towarzystwo Przyjaciół Society of Friends (1938). The Society of Friends soon established the Muzeum Ziemi Bieckiej (Museum of Bieczan Lands).

In 1934, the Ropa River flooded, washing away railway embankments and all the houses built on the banks or valleys of the River. The floodwaters rose to unprecedented heights.

The outbreak of World War II abruptly halted all forms of cultural life. The War resulted in significant population losses, as well as the destruction of several buildings and cultural facilities. Many people were resettled in Biecz from towns like Jasło; by 1944 the total population of the city was 5,973 inhabitants.

The Germans occupied the town in September 1939 and immediately began to terrorize the Jewish population, which amounted to around 600, kidnapping them for forced labor, robbing them of their possessions, and beating them at will. In October 1941, the Jewish population was confined to a ghetto. In 1942, murders began, usually instigated by the Gestapo and assisted by the Polish police. Jews from other locations were forcibly moved into the ghetto so that there were 1700 residents by mid-1942. In 1942 and 1943, the occupying Nazi forces carried out a number of Jewish massacres. In August 1942, 200 Jewish citizens were publicly executed by the Nazis in the town square. The remainder of the Jewish population were held for three days without food and water and then transported to the Belzec extermination camp. Polish police killed many of those trying to hide. Some survivors returned after the war but a few were murdered and the town refused to turn over synagogues which had been put to other uses. One synagogue was turned into a library. So the survivors left.

Nationalist and patriotic feelings were strong, and resistance forces quickly developed during both wars in the forms of National Army recruits and the Bataliony Chłopskie peasant battalions, as well as acts of violence and sabotage.

=== Post World War II ===
After the war, Biecz began the process of reconstruction and preservation. The first new buildings constructed were related to education, and included several high schools and vocational schools. In 1949, a new public library was built, and in 1953, a regional museum. During the 1970s, new buildings included hotels, restaurants, cooperatives, a health center, and a public kindergarten. The 1980s saw the construction of 150 single-family homes.

In 1950–1953, the city hall bell tower was renovated and strengthened, and the cupola covered in sheet copper. Later the city embarked on a costly campaign to repair and preserve the outer sgraffito. Numerous preservation projects were ongoing during this period in Corpus Christi Church, such as the preservation of confessionals, altars, statues, and so forth. In 1992, the church gates of Corpus Christi Church were demolished. The gates dated back to the Renaissance.

In 1955, a memorial plaque was placed on the city hall bell tower to commemorate the hundredth anniversary of the death of Adam Mickiewicz. During the 1970s, the city built and dedicated a monument to the victims of the world wars. In 1989, a bust of Marcin Kromer and accompanying monument were dedicated on the 400th anniversary of his death.

=== 21st century ===
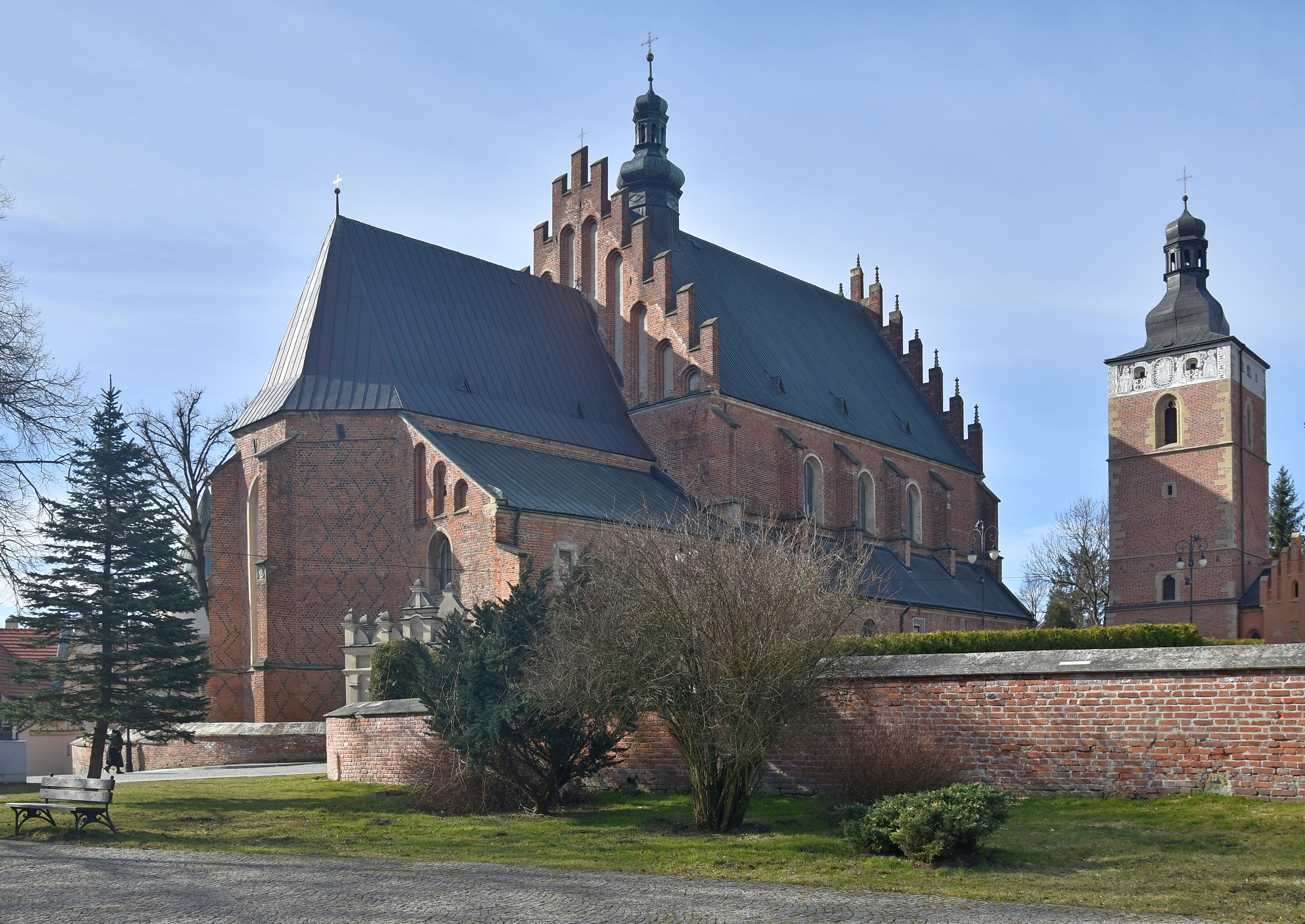
The Church of Corpus Christi, built in 1326, has undergone numerous restoration and preservation projects in the early years of the 21st century.

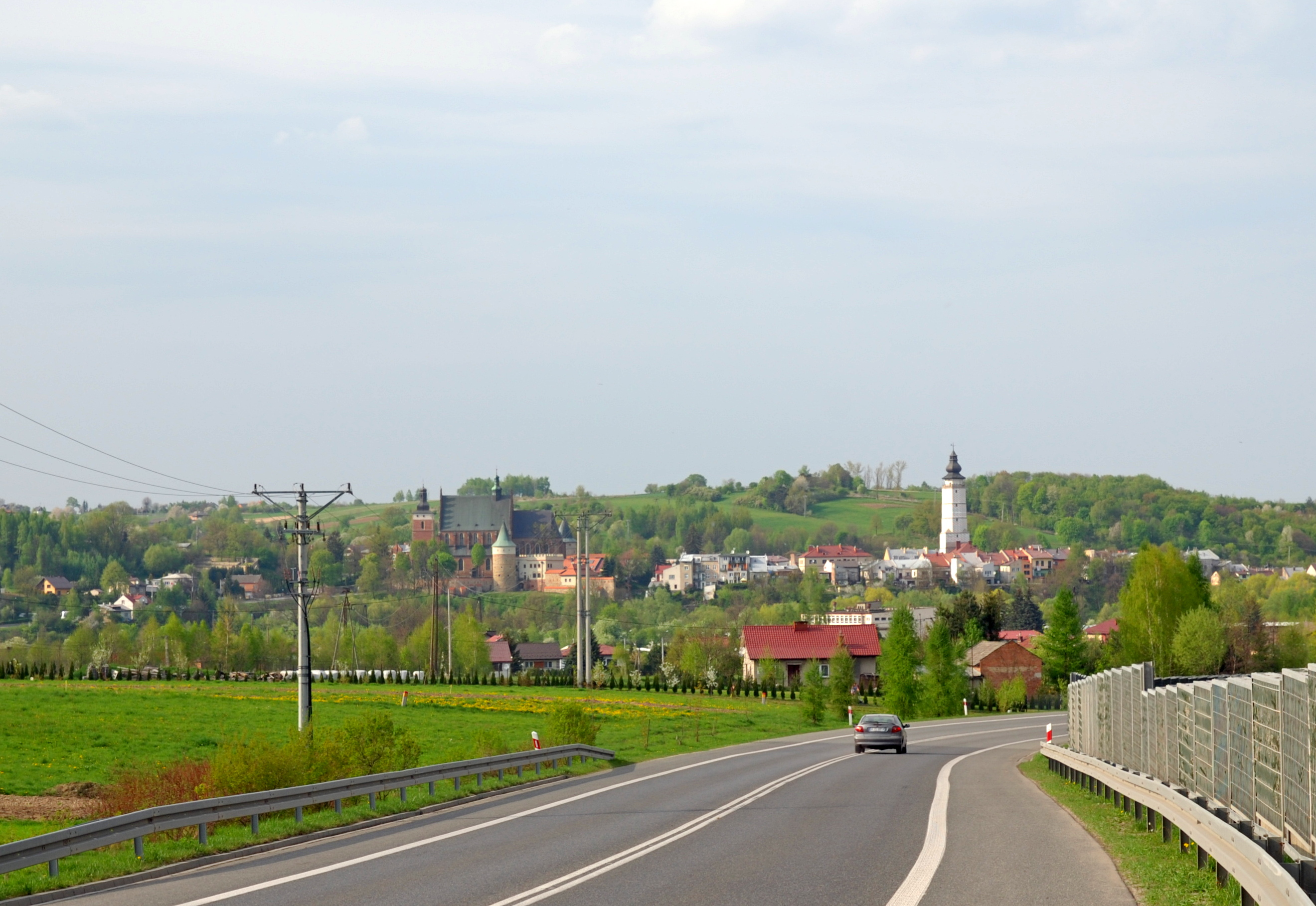
Contemporary panorama of Biecz

The 21st century has been marked by numerous restoration and preservation projects. In 2000, renovation work was completed on the 15th-century bell tower. The 14th-century Corpus Christi Church has been the scene of a number of important restoration projects, including the 2004 restoration of the altar of St. Teresa of Avilla, 2002 restoration of the main altar, and 2005 replacement of a number of important structural support beams.

In March 2001, the Fundacja na Rzecz Szpitala Ubogich im. św. Jadwigi Królowej w Bieczu was established as part of a campaign to save the Gothic Hospital of the Holy Ghost. Renovation and preservation work had already begun by 2004.

On 21 April 2005, the town government reinstated the tradition of playing the hejnał. Beginning June 2009 of that year, the hejnał was played from the bell tower of town hall.

Biecz was one of the towns to host the seventh annual Małopolskie Dni Dziedzictwa Kulturowego (Lesser Poland cultural heritage day) from 20 to 21 May 2006. On 8 June 2006, relics of Queen Jadwiga of Poland, the patron saint of Biecz, were brought to the town for a dedicated exhibition. The relics were processed along a number of city and country roads that the Queen probably walked.

On 1 July 2007, Biecz celebrated the 750-year anniversary of the city's establishment under Magdeburg law. The festival was marked by dance performances, musical exhibitions, theater, and lectures by historical experts.

On 16 October 2008, the Biecz beltway was officially opened.

== Geography ==
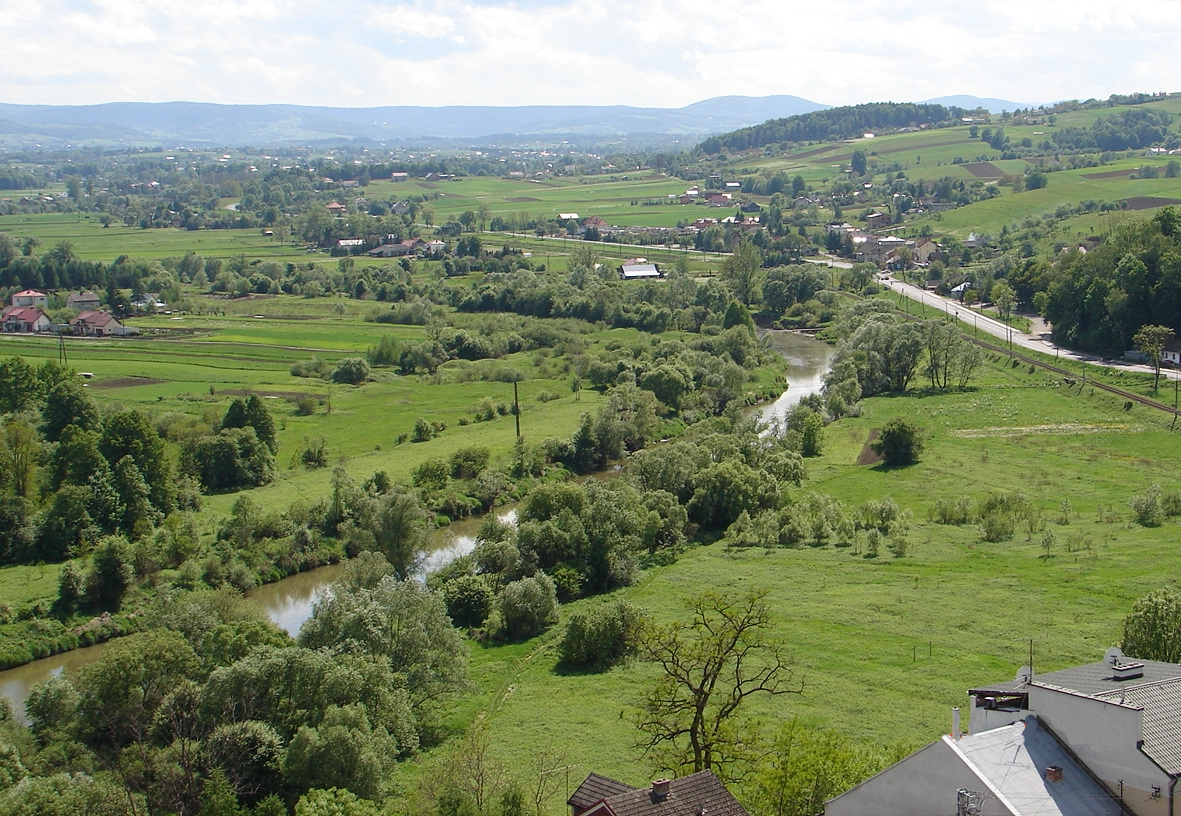
Ropa River runs alongside the city of Biecz. Historically, the river ran through the heart of the city, but the construction of the railroad prompted it to be rerouted.

Biecz lies on the Ropa River, on a pass through the Carpathian Mountains. Up until the 19th century, the River ran through the heart of the city. With the construction of the railroad, however, the river's course was altered so that it ran alongside the city instead.

Municipal land use Data from 30 July 2004
Description	ha	%
Agricultural	1330	74,72
Forests & wooded areas	271	15,22
Water	20	1,12
Urban development	75	4,22
Transportation	77	4,33
Unused	7	0,39
Other	-	0,00

Despite the relatively small size of the city, there is a significant grade in elevation. The highest point lies at 368.7 metres (1,210 ft) above sea level, while the lowest lies at 243 metres (797 ft). Biecz borders Binarowa, Głęboka, Grudna Kępska, Korczyna, Libusza, and Strzeszyn.

In the Biecz and the surrounding area there are a number of oil deposits.

Biecz lies in the South-eastern part of Poland, approximately 35 kilometres (22 mi) from the Slovak border and 100 kilometres (62 mi) from the Ukrainian border. The distance from Biecz to the most important Polish cities is: Nowy Sącz - 50 km (31 mi), Tarnów - 55 km (34 mi), Kraków - 125 km (78 mi), Katowice - 200 km (120 mi), Lublin - 250 km (160 mi), Łódź - 350 km (220 mi), Warsaw - 355 km (221 mi), Poznań - 575 km (357 mi), Bydgoszcz - 647 km (402 mi), Gdańsk - 705 km (438 mi), and Szczecin - 770 km (480 mi).

The city lies within the borders of the historical region of Małopolska. Throughout history, the territory was also a part of the region of Kraków. Biecz's importance during his medieval and renaissance heyday resulted in the city receiving administrative control over a significant amount of surrounding territory (Latin: Terra Biecensis).

=== Climate ===
The average annual temperature is approximately 6 °C (43 °F). The average high in July is 17 °C (63 °F), and in January the average low is −5 °C (23 °F). The area receives at most 900 millimetres (35 in) of rain per annum. Sheet ice in winter lasts approximately 100 days, and has an average thickness of 15 centimetres (5.9 in).

== Districts ==
Biecz municipality is divided into three formal divisions called jednostki pomocnicze gminy. These divisions are numbered 1, 2, and 3.

Biecz municipality is split into three formal divisions called jednostki pomocnicze gminy (literally: auxiliary municipality units). These divisions are numbered one through three. Each division has a governing council, with an elected chairman. As of 2007, the chairmen of the divisions were: Władysław Lignar, Renata Kudła, and Ireneusz Zając.

=== Neighbourhoods ===
In addition to the formal divisions, Biecz has a number of neighborhoods, each with their own particular history and character. These include:

1. Miasto: old parts of town enclosed by the remains of the city walls.
2. Podwale: historical buildings that abut the remains of the city walls. The name literally means "under the walls."
3. Załawie: part of town on the embankments of the Ropa River. The neighborhood abuts the village of Korczyna
4. Belna Dolna: part of town along the banks of the Ropa within district 2.
5. Belna Górna: area encompassed by district number 2, along ulica Belna Górna.
6. Przedmieście Dolne: Settlement along ulica Przedmieście Dolne and partly along Casimir the Great Street.
7. Kurpiel: also called Przedmieście Górne, part of town along ulica Przedmieście Górne.
8. Osiedle Górne: settlement along the streets ulica Tysiąclecia, ulica Skłodowska, ulica królowa Jadwiga, and ulica Słoneczny.
9. Nęckówka: settlement past Osiedle Górne. It is sparsely populated, and mostly consists of forests, orchards, and cultivated fields.
10. Wapniska: part of town along the top of ulica ks. Jan Bochniewicz
11. Harta: part of town along ulica Harta.

== Demographics ==
Detailed demographics data as of 31 December 2021
Description	Total		Women		Men
Unit	Persons	%	Persons	%	Persons	%
Population	4468	100	2323	52.0	2145	48.0
Population density	252		131		121

With a population of approximately 5,000, Biecz ranks as the 44th most populous city in Lesser Poland Voivodeship. As the city prospered and grew, so did the population. In the 14th century, the district of Biecz, including the surrounding villages, had a total population of 522. By the mid-16th century, this number was 3,700, and by the early 17th century had fallen back down to approximately 1,800.

During the first half of the 16th century, Biecz was one of the largest Polish cities both in size and population. The wars with Sweden as well as numerous fires caused the population to begin to decrease. In 1721, a great plague struck Biecz. The thirty survivors built a memorial chapel to St. Michael the Archangel in memory of the victims. Nazi occupation during World War II resulted in significant population losses. A number of smaller villages were resettled into Biecz during this time, resulting, in 1944, in a population of 5,973, the highest recorded population in history.

In recent years, Biecz has slowly begun to decrease in population once more. There exists a migration trend that moves populations from cities to larger cities and abroad, mostly due to high unemployment and lack of higher education institutions. According to census records, in 2007 the city had 4,575 inhabitants, about 73 fewer than in the previous year.

As of December 2021, the city has 4,468 inhabitants.

In Biecz there are 107 women for every 100 men. The number of women in an age group is greater than the number of men for all age groups except the following: 5–19, 30–34, and 40–44.

== Monuments ==
Due to its long history, Biecz is home to a number of culturally and historically significant monuments and buildings. Some of the most important of these include the 14th-century Corpus Christi Church, the 15th-century town hall bell tower, and the 14th-century hospital of the Holy Ghost.

=== Corpus Christi Church ===
The Corpus Christi Church (Polish: Kościół Bożego Ciała) is a Polish Brick Gothic church dating back to the early 14th century. One of the most important churches in Poland, it houses the relics of Queen Jadwiga. The church is built of stone and brick, and decorated with patterns of strongly fired bricks.

The oldest part of the church is the presbytery, which was completed before 1480. This date was inscribed on a support beam, and probably indicates the year in which expansion was begun. According to the monument registry of the Kingdom of Poland, construction first began in 1326. The presbytery entrance is framed by a 15th-century painted screen of the Passion of Jesus Christ. To the sides are 17th-century stalls. A music pulpit that dates back to 1633, and which is the oldest such monument of its kind in Europe, can be found on the altar.

The altar was built in 1604. The altarpiece includes an image of the cross, circled by St. Michael the Archangel. It is one of three such images in the world. Above the painting is a scene showing the fatigue of the Mother of God, painted by Stanislas Stoss, son of Veit Stoss. At the top is the coronation of Mary. To the left of the altar is the 17th-century lesser altar of the Immaculate Conception, which features the family tree of Mary.

On either side of the presbytery are 17th-century, richly carved stalls. To the left is the Oratorium, where, according to legend, St. Jadwiga often prayed. In 2006, a shrine was added to the Oratorium to hold the relics of St. Jadwiga.

The church has eight chapels. Each chapel has a patron and guild dedicated to it. The chapels are:

- chapel of Marcin Kromer (tailors guild)
- chapel of St. Anthony of Padua (shoemakers guild)
- chapel of Holy Mother (carpenters guild)
- chapel of St. Michael the Archangel (weavers guild)
- chapel of Bonarów, Wielkopolska and Ligęzów
- chapel of St. John Cantius (bakers guild)
- chapel of St. Tekla (butchers guild)
- chapel of St. Joseph (blacksmiths guild)

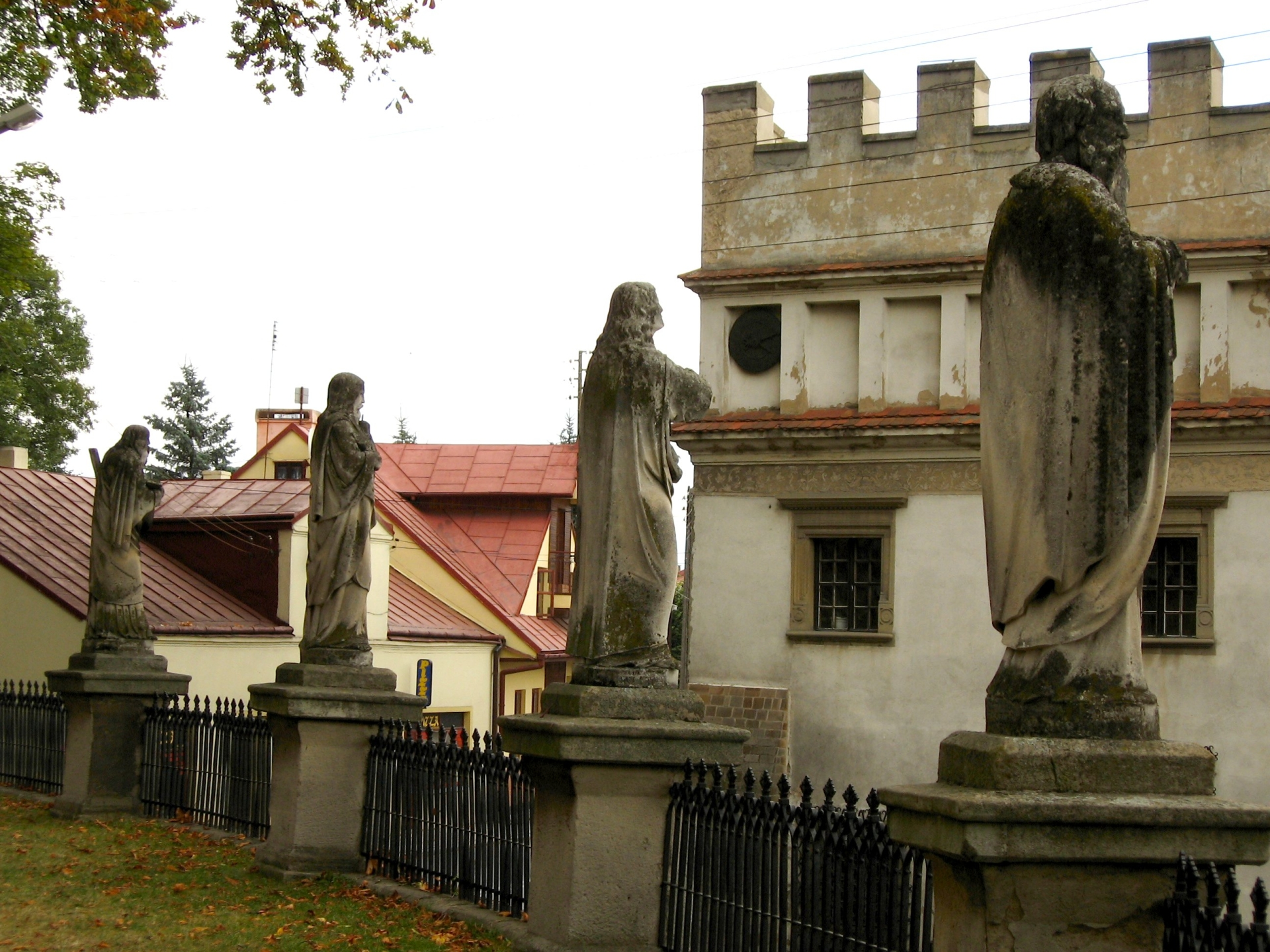
Hungarian statues representing the Apostles.

The main nave was added in 1519, and consists of a huge stone vault supported by eight stone pillars. A hanging pulpit was added in 1604. On the left of the chancel is the altar of Our Lady of the Rosary, alongside sculptures of Piotr Sułowski, Saint Anne, and Mikołaj Spytek Ligęza. Near the Kromer and St. Anthony chapels is a memorial plaque to the 400th anniversary of Marcin Kromer's death.

The wooden choir loft was built in 1898 by organmaster Jan Śliwiński. The organ has 22 voices, 2 manual and keyboard foot pedals. The instrument itself was designed by Sławomir Odrzywolski. The choir stalls date back to the Renaissance period.

Alongside the church is a 15th-century bell tower that was initially intended to serve as a defensive tower under the auspices of the butchers guild. The bell dates back to the 14th century. Since World War II, the bell has been on display in the Kromer House museum. The belltower is built alongside the 19th-century chapel of St. Barbara that was built over the ruins of a 15th-century chapel.

The outer walls of the church are decorated with Hungarian-sculpted statues of the Apostles.

=== Town hall ===
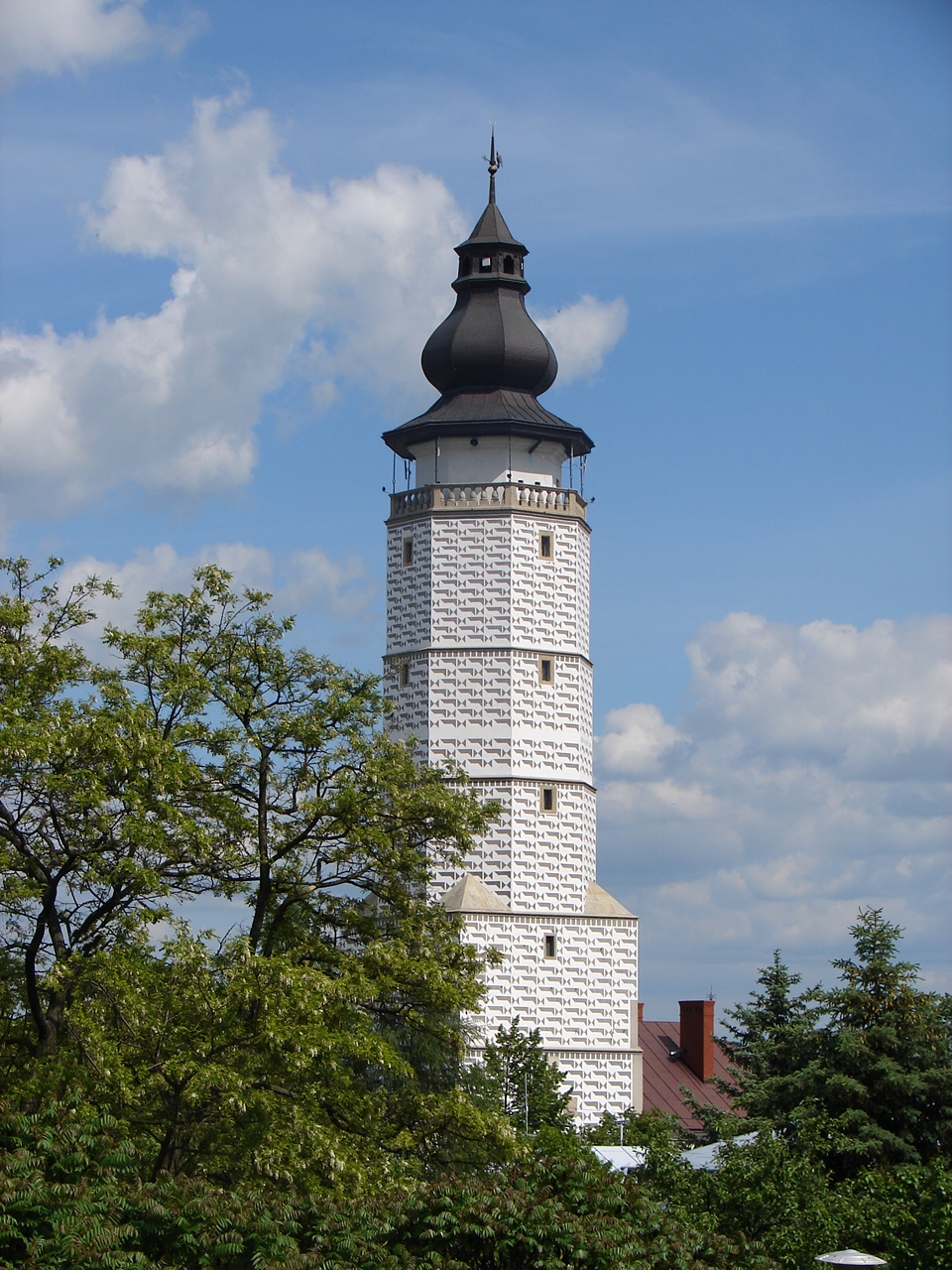
The bell tower, as seen from the city walls.

The originally Gothic town hall was rebuilt in the 16th century, and served as the center of administrative power for the powiat of Biecz. After the First Partition of Poland, the powiat was dissolved, and the parts of the building dedicated to its administration fell into disuse. In the 19th century, the eastern wing of the hall was demolished. These foundations were discovered during a 1958 archaeological excavation of market square. Today these foundations are marked with commemorative plates.

The old bell tower collapsed from disrepair on 8 May 1569. It was rebuilt from 1569 to 1580 with funds donated by Marcin Kromer. The tower stands at 58 metres (190 ft) in height, the highest building in the town. The walls are sgraffitoed plaster simulating the appearance of rustication.

Inside hang numerous crests and coats of arms, including that of Marcin Kromer and Adam Mickiewicz. On the east wall is a 16th-century 24-hour clock face. This style of clock is rare, as the 17th century brought with it a switch to 12-hour clock faces.

The bell tower's ornate cap burned in the great city fire on 12 May 1903. During the process of reconstruction, the cap was rebuilt with wooden shingles, which in 1998 were covered with sheet copper. Historically, a trumpeter played the hejnał from this tower when the city gates were opened, morning, noon, and night. This tradition ended with the collapse of the old bell tower, which killed the town trumpeter. In 2005, the tradition was restarted, and today the hejnał is played every day at noon.

The lowest levels of the tower include a dungeon called Turm. Convicts scratched primitive calendars and other inscriptions into the walls, which are still visible to this day. Today, the dungeons include an exhibition of prison cells, and an exhibition dedicated to medieval torture instruments.

=== Holy Spirit Hospital ===
The Hospital of the Holy Spirit (Polish: Szpital św. Ducha) is the oldest preserved hospital in Poland. The Catholic church first began establishing hospitals in Western Europe during the 8th century. The first Polish hospitals were established during the 13th century, where they were administered by various religious orders. Each hospital had an attached parish and church.

By the late 14th century, Biecz had accumulated a population of over 3,000 residents, necessitating some form of public health service. On 25 July 1395, Queen Jadwiga signed a royal edict ordering the construction of the hospital, granting tax breaks for the duration of construction, and earmarking two fiefs, a folwark, 3 fish ponds, and a town square near the city walls for construction. The budget provided by the queen for construction was one of the largest of its kind in the country.

In the 18th century, the church attached to the hospital was demolished, and in the 19th century, the hospital was renovated. The hospital continued to administer to the poor until 1950, when it was converted into a boys' boarding school. After a new school building had been built, the hospital was abandoned, and began to fall into a state of disrepair. Attempts to restore the buildings began during the 1980s, but were disrupted due to political changes in Poland. Due to difficult economic times from 1991 to 1997, only the walls and roofs have been preserved at present.

The hospital is in the eastern part of the city, and consists of a two-story building measuring 21 by 10.5 metres (69 ft × 34 ft). The eastern and western walls are decorated with patterns made from dark, strongly fired bricks. The eastern wall has two entries, while the west has one stone entry that has since been walled over. Above the stone entryway is a stone sculpture of the Polish coat of arms with the date 1487, that was probably moved there from the remnants of the third castle during the 17th century.

=== House of Kromer ===
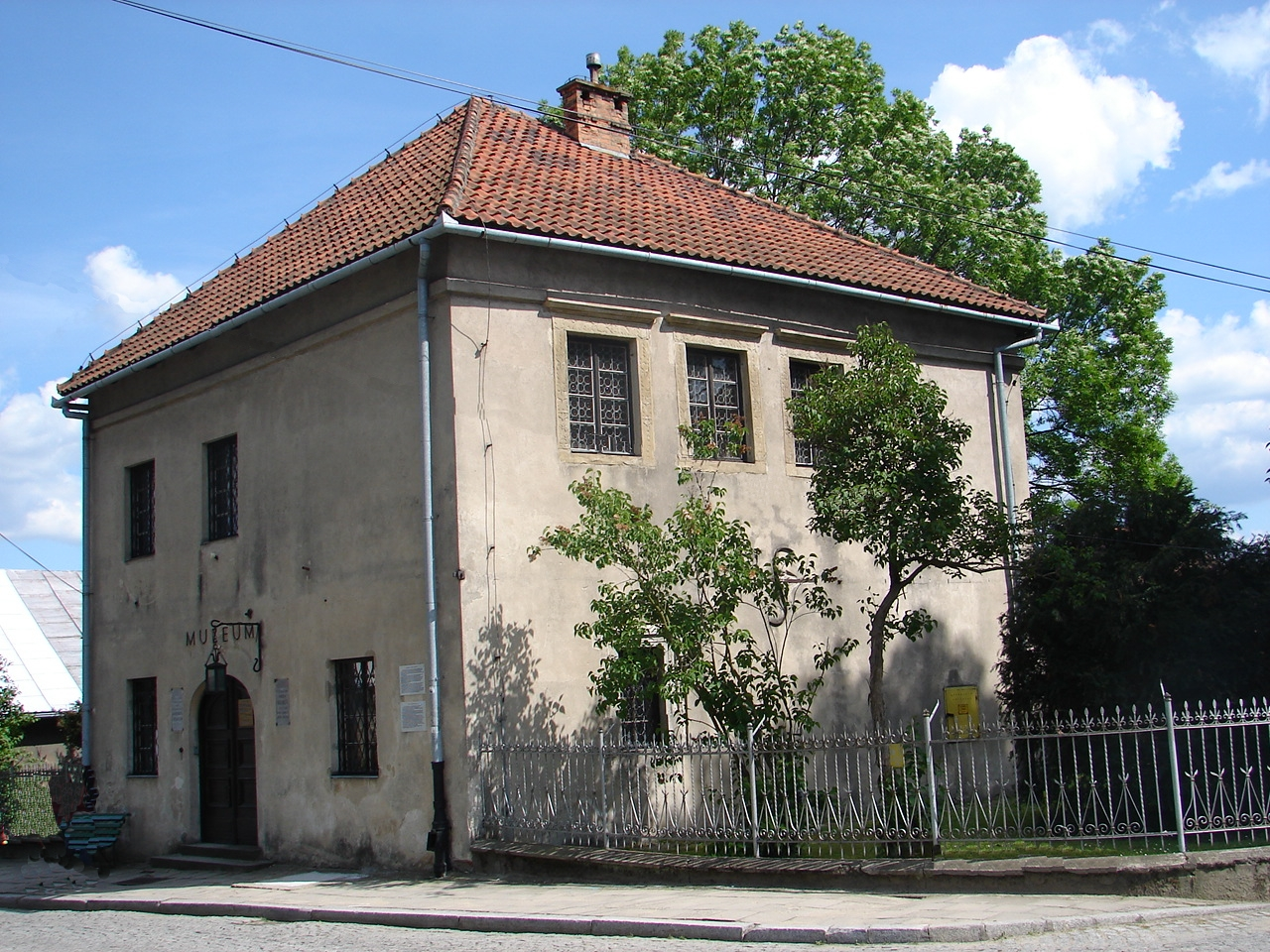
The Kromer House houses a cultural museum.

The Kromer House (Polish: Dom Kromera) is a 16th-century building that never actually belonged to Marcin Kromer. Built in 1519, only seven years after Kromer's birth, the building belonged to the wealthy Chodorów family.

Today the building houses a cultural museum that includes a number of important folk artifacts, art, and coins. The oldest exhibits include axeheads and related neolithic artefacts, as well as Roman and Byzantine coins, and medieval ceramics and weaponry. Other exhibits showcase historical weaponry and the day-to-day life of townspeople throughout history.

=== City walls ===
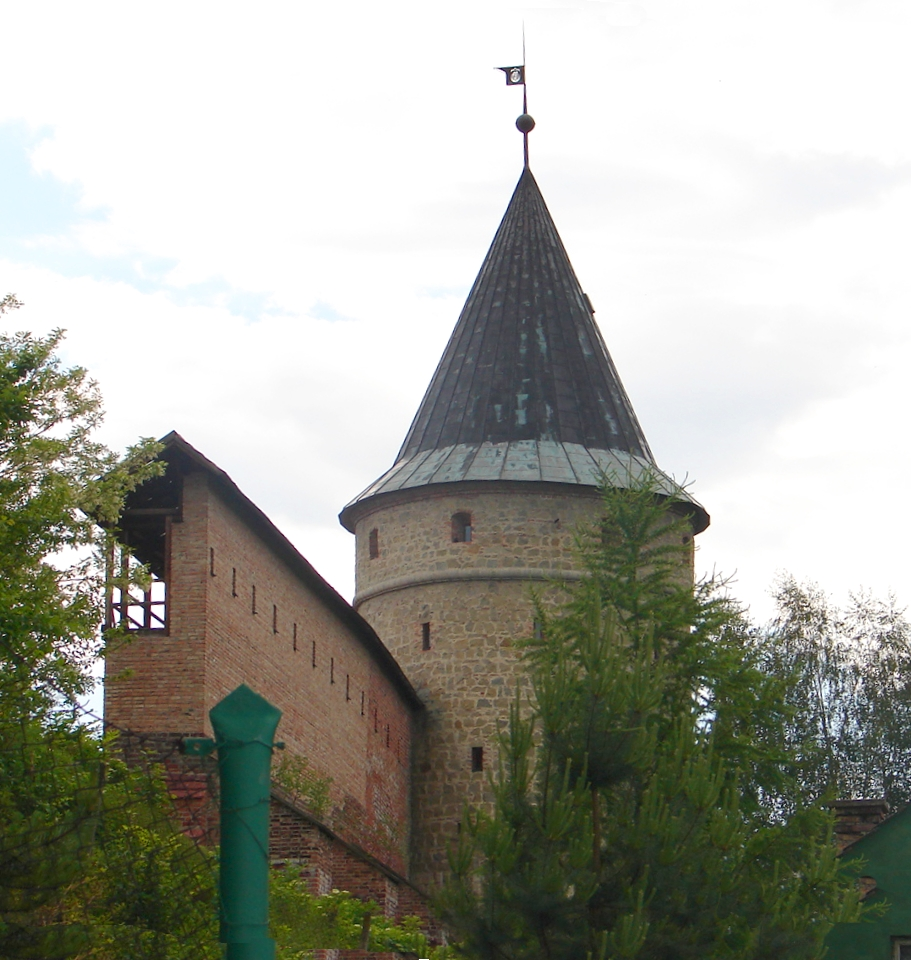
The smith's tower and a fragment of the remaining city walls.

The city walls date back to the beginnings of the 14th century, when approximately 1,200 meters of walls protected the city. During the course of history, the city's defense systems altered to reflect the changing technologies of war, and today there remain only fragments of the original defenses. These fragments can be seen near Corpus Christi Church and the hospital of the Holy Ghost.

Of the seventeen original towers, only three remain standing:

- Kowalska tower, or smith's tower, which currently houses a museum exhibition.
- Rzeźnick tower, the bell tower.
- Radziecka tower, or the municipal commissioner's tower, which also houses a museum exhibition, and which is also known as the House of Barian Rokicki.

In 1964, the foundations of one of Poland's best-known barbicans was discovered near Corpus Christi Church.

=== Castle ===
During the course of history, there existed three separate castles in Biecz. Currently, only the ruins of one of these remain. Of the other two castles, one was built in the current location of the Franciscan church, while the other was located on land owned by the hospital.

Only the foundations remain of the Gothic royal castle on nearby Górze Zamkowej (literally Castle Mountain). The castle was built on the foundations of an early medieval gord. Built in the 13th century, the castle was made of fortified stone, and served as field headquarters for Polish kings and princes.

The entire hill was surrounded by a rectangular defensive wall. The northern gate was guarded by a tower, bridge, and gates. The southern wall was protected by the Ropa River.

The castle ceased to be considered an important line of defense during the second half of the 15th century. In 1475, King Casimir IV Jagiellon ordered the castle's demolition. Large pieces of stonework and related ruins were scattered across the nearby countryside as late as the 19th century. Today, all that is visible is the foundation of the castle, which has been preserved for posterity.

== Transport, education and economy ==
There are 3 bus stops and one railway station. There are 4 schools. The main industries are trade, services and tourism. There is one cinema.

== Notable residents ==
- Wacław Potocki, poet
- Marcin Kromer, cartographer, diplomat and historian
- Apolinary Kotowicz, painter
- Tadeusz Ślawski, writer
- Witold Fusek, pharmacist

== Panoramic view ==
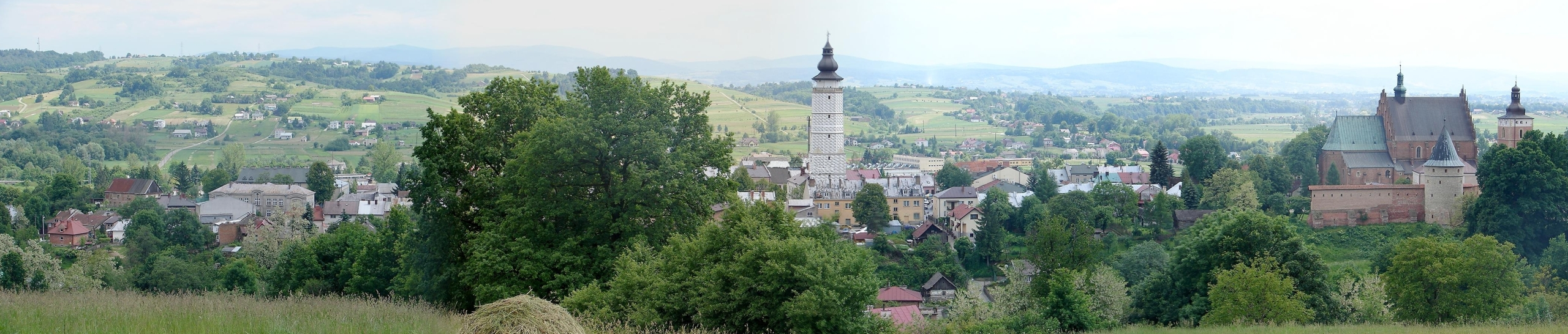
The old part of Biecz, as seen from the suburb of Wapniska. The white tower of town hall is located center, while Corpus Christi church can be seen to the right.

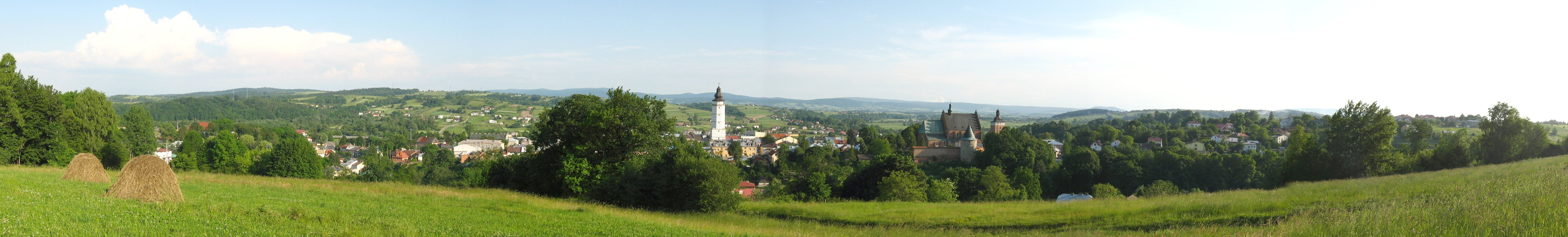
Panoramic view.

== See also ==
- Walddeutsche
