= Marcin Kromer =

Prince-Bishop of Warmia

- Bishop of Warmia
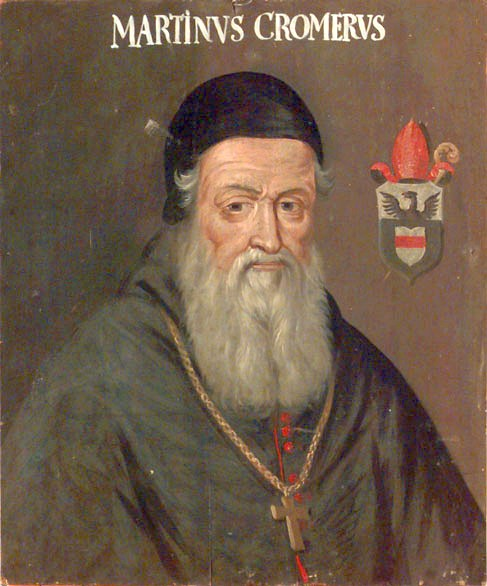
- Installed: 1579
- Term ended: 1589
- Predecessor: Stanislaus Hosius
- Successor: Andrew Báthory

Personal details
- Born: 11 November 1512 Biecz, Kingdom of Poland
- Died: 23 March 1589 (aged 76) Lidzbark Warmiński, Polish–Lithuanian Commonwealth
- Coat of arms

Marcin Kromer (Latin: Martinus Cromerus; 11 November 1512 – 23 March 1589) was Prince-Bishop of Warmia (Ermland), a Polish cartographer, diplomat and historian in the Kingdom of Poland and later in the Polish–Lithuanian Commonwealth. He was a personal secretary to two Kings of Poland, Sigismund I the Old and Sigismund II Augustus.

== Biography ==
Kromer was born in 1512 into a prominent burgher family of German descent in Biecz, in Lesser Poland. He completed his basic education in a local church-run school. In 1528 he transferred to Kraków, where in 1530 he graduated as a bachelor at the Cracow Academy. In 1533–37 he worked at the Royal Chancellery in Kraków. Thereafter he went to Italy, where he studied law for two years. Returning to Poland in 1540, he became secretary to Archbishop Piotr Gamrat. As the latter's personal advisor, he was also his envoy and representative to Rome, where he spent two years until 1544. He then became a canon in Kraków.

In 1545, upon the death of his mentor, Kromer accepted the latter's post as personal secretary to Poland's King Sigismund I the Old. He was also an associate of Samuel Maciejowski, who later became Chancellor of the Crown. A specialist on Royal Prussia and Warmia, in 1551 Kromer became head of the Warmian canonry. However, his church career did not proceed as planned, since he was seen as one of the best Polish diplomats of the age and was frequently required by the court to leave his post to serve as envoy on various diplomatic missions. In 1552, for his services to the King, he was ennobled and granted a coat of arms.

From 1558 to 1564 Kromer served as Polish envoy to Emperor Ferdinand I, who in recognition of Kromer's services added his own family coat-of-arms to Kromer's. The latter's tasks included advocacy of King Sigismund's claims to the inheritance of the late Queen-Consort Bona Sforza, which was also claimed by the King of Spain, who, however, based his claims on a forged testament.

In 1564 Kromer was recalled to Poland, where he was promoted within the church hierarchy and took the post of coadjutor (de facto bishop) of the Bishopric of Warmia, to succeed on the demise of Prince-Bishop Stanislaus Hosius. After nine years at that post, Kromer was officially promoted to Prince-Bishop. He spent the rest of his days in Warmia, keeping diaries and writing several books on the history of Poland. He died on 23 March 1589 in Heilsberg (Lidzbark Warmiński).

In his works, Kromer advocated the reform of Poland's scientific and cultural life. One of his notable demands was providing the Cracow Academy with new privileges to restore its position as one of the renowned universities in Central Europe. He also promoted the active defence of the Roman Catholic Church against the growing Reformation.

Martin Kromer and Stanislaus Hosius (Stanisław Hozjusz) were the two bishops most instrumental in causing Royal Prussia's diocese of Warmia to return to or remain Catholic during a time of major conversions to Protestantism, especially in the neighboring Duchy of Prussia which almost surrounded the Prince-Bishopric of Warmia, and had converted to Lutheranism as the first state to do so.

== Works ==
Marcin Kromer published his works in Latin and Polish.

=== In Latin ===
- Musicae elementa, Kraków, 1532, survived only one fragment: De plana musica liber prior.
- Martini Cromeri Sermo de tvenda dignitate sacerdotii, Petricoviae in Synodo habitus, Kraków, 1542,
- Martini Cromeri De origine et rebvs gestis Polonorvm libri XXX. Adiecta est in fine, eiusdem autoris funebris Oratio Sigismvndi regis uitam compendiose complexa, 1555,
- Martini Cromeri Varmiensis Episcopi Polonia: siue de origine et rebus gestis Polonorum libri XXX of 1555 (About origins and history of Poles in thirty books) in Latin, (Polish translation O sprawach, dziejach i wszystkich innych potocznościach koronnych polskich published in Cologne 1589,
- Polonia sive de situ, populis, moribus, magistratibus et Republica regni Polonici libri duo published in Cologne in 1577 (Poland, about location, culture and offices) in Latin, (Polish translation Polska, czyli o położeniu, obyczajach, urzędach Rzeczypospolitej Królestwa Polskiego in 1853)
- Catecheses sive Institvtiones dvodecim de septem Sacramentis & sacrificio Missae & de funeribus exequiis : ad vtilitatem parochorum & aliorum Sacerdotum, in Polonicam Germanicamq[ue] linguam conversae Kraków, 1570,
- Oratio Martini Cromeri in fvnere optimi & maximi principis, Sigismundi, eius nominis primi Polonorum, Litvanorum, Russorum, Prussorum, & Masouiorum Regis, etc., Kraków, 1548,

=== In Polish ===
- Rozmowa dworzanina z mnichem, Czego sye krzesciyánski człowyek dźyerżeć ma : mnichá z dworzáninem rozmowa wtora of 1551-1554 (in English: "Discourse between a Courtier and a Monk")
- Historyja prawdziwa o przygodzie żałosnej książęcia finlandzkiego Jana i królewny polskiej Katarzyny from 1570, (in English: "A True Story of the Sorrowful Adventure of John, Prince of Finland, and the Polish Princess, Catherine"), a narrative about the love and adventures of John III of Sweden and Catherine Jagiellon of Poland, parents to Sigismund III Vasa

http://staropolska.pl/ang/renaissance/Kromer/kromer.php3

== Bibliography ==
- F. Hipler, Die deutschen Predigten und Katechesen der ermländischen Bischöfe Hosius und Cromer, Cologne, 1885

== See also ==
- List of Poles

Catholic Church titles
Regnal titles
Preceded by Stanislaus Hosius	Prince-Bishop of Warmia (Ermland); 1579–1589	Succeeded by Andrew Báthory
