= List of ghost towns by country =

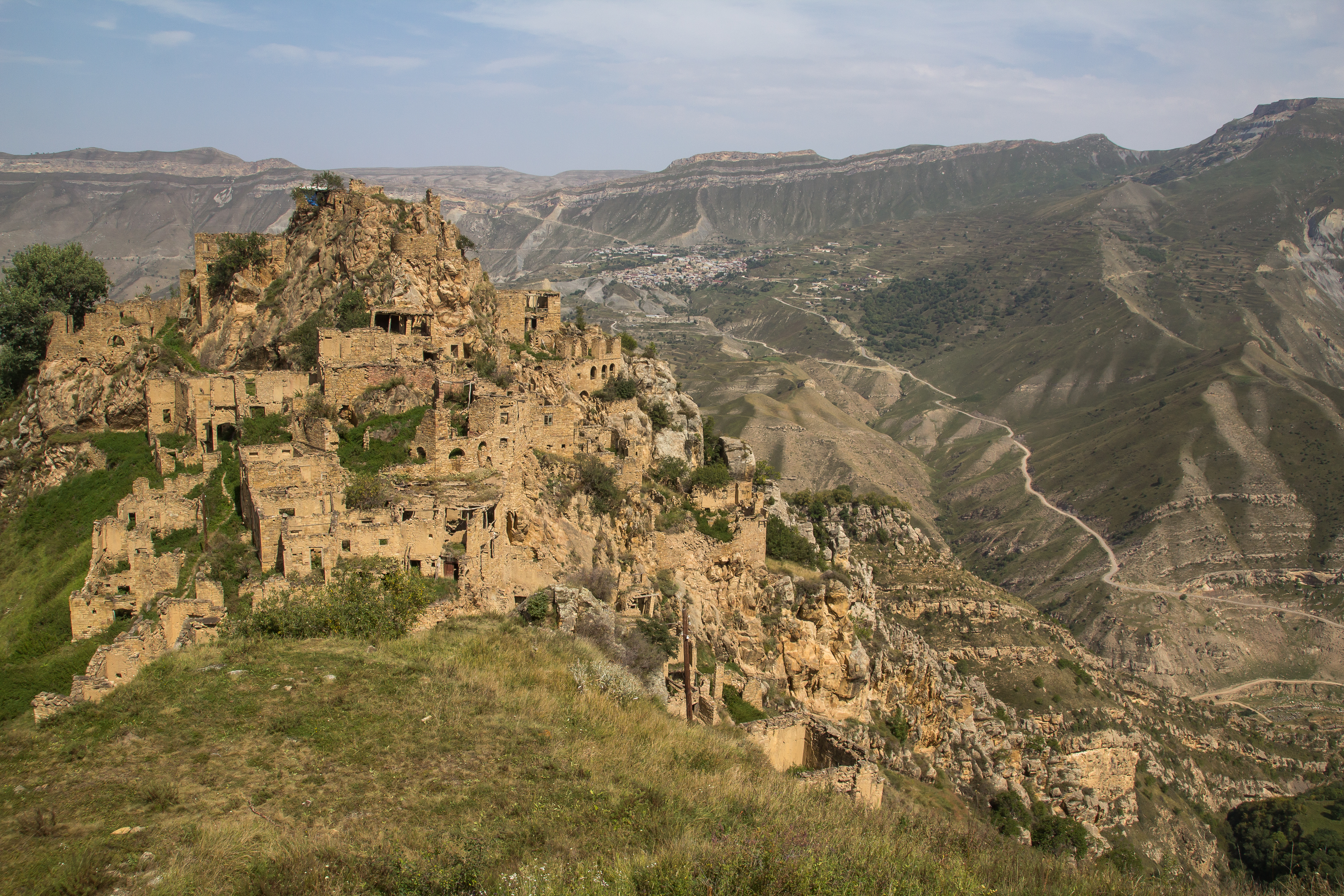
The remote ghost town of Gamsutl in Dagestan, Russia

The following is an incomplete list of ghost towns, listed by continent, then by country.

== Africa ==
=== Angola ===
- Saint Martin of the Tigers (in Portuguese: São Martinho dos Tigres), a settlement situated on a peninsula now known as the Tigres Island (in Portuguese: Ilha dos Tigres), was originally a small but well-established fishing village. It was supplied with water from the nearby town of Foz do Cunene, at the mouth of the Cunene River. In the 1970s, Saint Martin of the Tigers was cut off from the mainland by the rising sea levels, and its water supply line was severed; both Tigres and Foz do Cunene were subsequently abandoned. The island, bound by the South Atlantic Ocean and the Tigres Strait, lies in a zone that is ideally suited for ecological projects. The island was mentioned in the BBC documentary "Unknown Africa: Angola".
- Foz do Cunene, located near Saint Martin of the Tigers and similarly abandoned due to rising sea levels.
- Miconje Velho, in northern Cabinda near the Congolese border.
- Nova Cidade de Kilamba was an underoccupied development built by China International Trust and Investment Company near Luanda. Although the city's population eventually grew, in early days it was heralded as a ghost town and predicted to stay that way.

=== Central African Republic ===
- Goroumo, Beogombo Deux, and Paoua are among the many deserted villages created by the actions of government forces and killings by armed gangs from the years 2005 to 2008.
- Lere, Central African Republic.

=== Egypt ===
- Avshalom, Dikla, Nahal Yam, Netiv HaAsara, Sufa, Talmei Yosef, Yamit, and Pri'el were Israeli settlements in the Sinai built after the Six-Day War in 1967. They were dismantled by the Israeli government after the Camp David Accords in 1978 and the Egypt-Israel peace treaty of 1979 and are today abandoned.

=== Ethiopia ===
- Dallol is a former mining town located in the Dallol crater, where the temperature can rise as high as 104 °F (40 °C).
- Abala, a town on the border between Tigray and Afar, was largely abandoned following months of violence during the Tigray War.

=== Ivory Coast ===
- Grand-Bassam was the French Colonial capital of Côte d'Ivoire until 1896 when it was abandoned by the French Colonial Government. Commercial activity gradually weakened until the city became a virtual ghost town in 1960, the same year Côte d'Ivoire became independent. Today the city has revived somewhat as a tourist center, but it still has the aura of a ghost town.

=== Mauritania ===
- Chinguetti is a former medieval trading center on the Adrar Plateau.

=== Morocco ===
- Ahouli is an abandoned lead-mining village in central Morocco.

=== Namibia ===
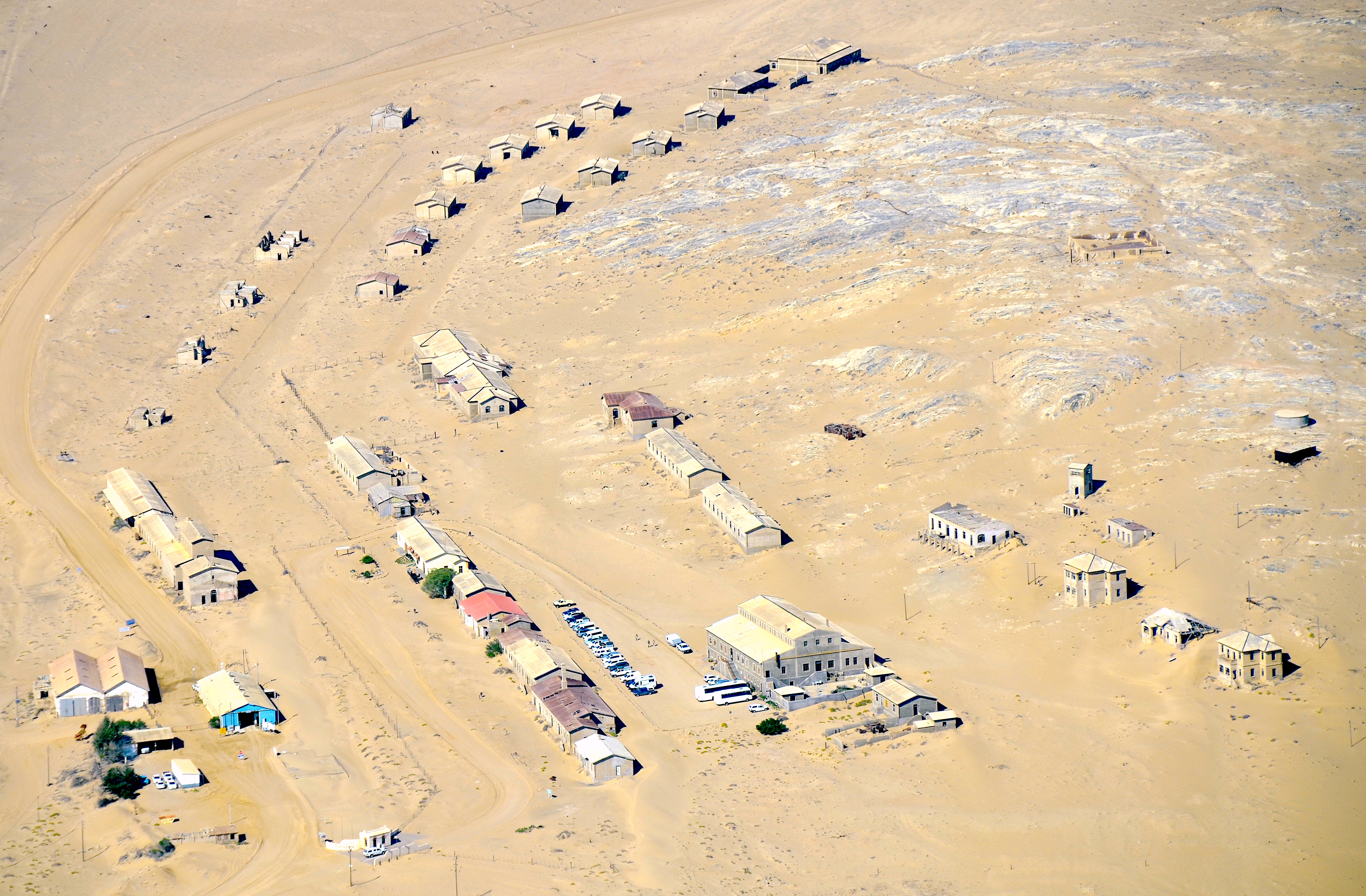
Kolmanskop (2017)

From 1884 to 1915, Namibia was under the rule of the German Empire and was known as German South West Africa. When diamonds were discovered in 1908, German miners flocked to the area, and several new settlements were established, only to be abandoned once the supply of diamonds dried up. The ghost towns that were left behind include:

- Elizabeth Bay
- Kolmanskop
- Pomona

=== South Africa ===
- Bowesdorp is a former village near Kamieskroon.
- Copperton is a former copper mining town in the Northern Cape.
- Eureka City is an abandoned mining town in Mpumalanga. It is now a historical site.
- Diepgezet is an abandoned asbestos mining town in Mpumalanga. It was transferred to tribal land and renamed to Msauli.
- Leydsdorp is an abandoned mining town near Tzaneen in Limpopo province.
- Millwood is an abandoned mining town near Knysna.
- Plaatjieskraal is an abandoned fishing town near Pearly Beach.
- Pomfret is an abandoned asbestos mining town in the North West province.
- Putsonderwater is an abandoned town in the Northern Cape.
- Schoemansdal was a town that was destroyed in 1867.

=== Sudan ===
- In the northeast of Sudan lies the old city of Sawakin. It is now in ruins. It is said to be in restoration now and will reopen as a tourist attraction.
- El Fasher, the de facto capital of Darfur was overrun by the Rapid Support Forces (RSF) in late October 2025, after an 18-month siege, a development that left the RSF in control of the entire region which reverted to a "ghost town" status, showing no signs of life in the city.

=== South Sudan ===
- Lukangol was destroyed during the 2011 South Sudan clashes. Before its destruction, it had a population of 20,000.

=== Western Sahara ===
- La Güera is a ghost town on the Atlantic coast at the southern tip of Western Sahara. It is Western Sahara's southernmost town. It has been uninhabited and partly buried by drifting sand since 2002.

== Antarctica and sub-Antarctic islands ==
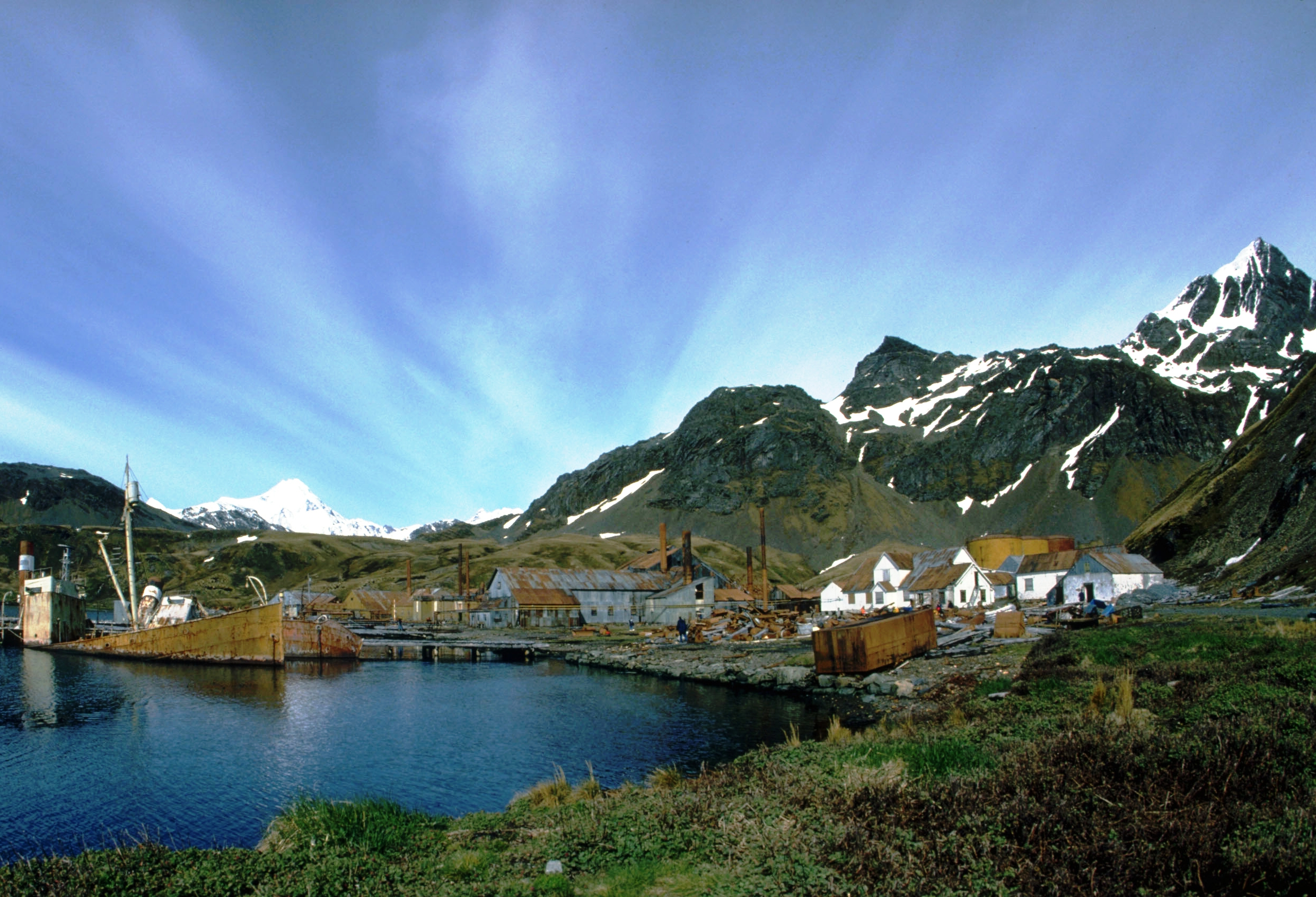
The ghost town of Grytviken, South Georgia Island

The islands of Antarctica, particularly South Georgia, were popular with whalers during the first half of the 20th century, and many of the settlements on these islands are former whaling stations. Most of them were closed down during the Great Depression, when whaling became unprofitable, and are now abandoned. These settlements include:

=== Deception Island ===
- Whaler's Bay

=== South Georgia and the South Sandwich Islands ===
- Grytviken
- Husvik
- Leith Harbour
- Ocean Harbour
- Prince Olav Harbour
- Stromness

== Asia ==
=== Azerbaijan ===
- Sarıhacılı, a town of more than 28,000 in the late 1980s, its population has since dwindled to 0.

=== Bangladesh ===
- Panam City in Sonargaon was established in the late 19th century as a trading center of cotton fabrics during British rule. Here the Hindu cloth merchants built their residential houses. After the Indo-Pakistani War of 1965 and the Muslim-Hindu riot, Panam City has reduced into a vacant community. Today this area is protected under the department of archaeology of Bangladesh. Panam city area was linked with the main city area by three brick bridges – Panam Bridge, Dalalpur Bridge, and Panam Nagar Bridge – during the Mughal period. The bridges are still in use.

=== British Indian Ocean Territory ===
- East Point was a settlement in the atoll of Diego Garcia, and it has been abandoned after the depopulation of the territory, it is restricted to visitors.

=== Cambodia ===
- Bokor Hill Station was a resort town built by colonial French settlers in 1921.

=== China ===
- Niya, in the Tarim Basin, was once a major commercial center dating back to around 500–1000 AD.
- Houtouwan, a depopulated fishing village, now a major tourist attraction.
- Khara-Khoto, abandoned Western Xia city

=== Cyprus ===
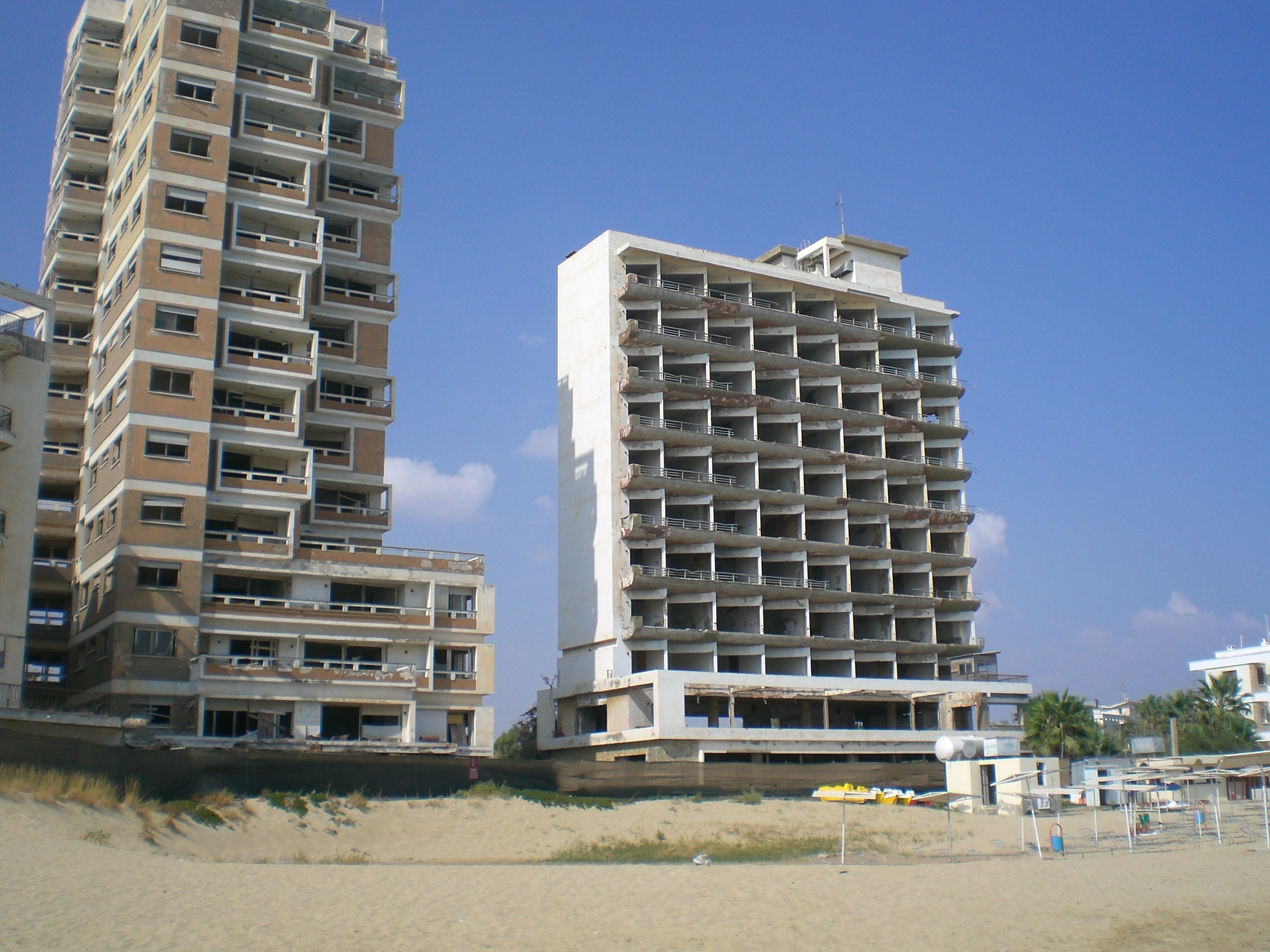
The ghost town of Varosha, Cyprus

- Mansoura
- Varosha was once the modern tourist area of the city of Famagusta. It was fenced off by the Turkish army following the Turkish invasion of Cyprus in 1974 and is now under TRNC rule. United Nations Security Council Resolution 550 forbids any attempt "to settle any part of Varosha by people other than its inhabitants", so the area had remained abandoned since 1974, but the Turkish government reopened the city to visitors.
- Vikla

=== Georgia ===
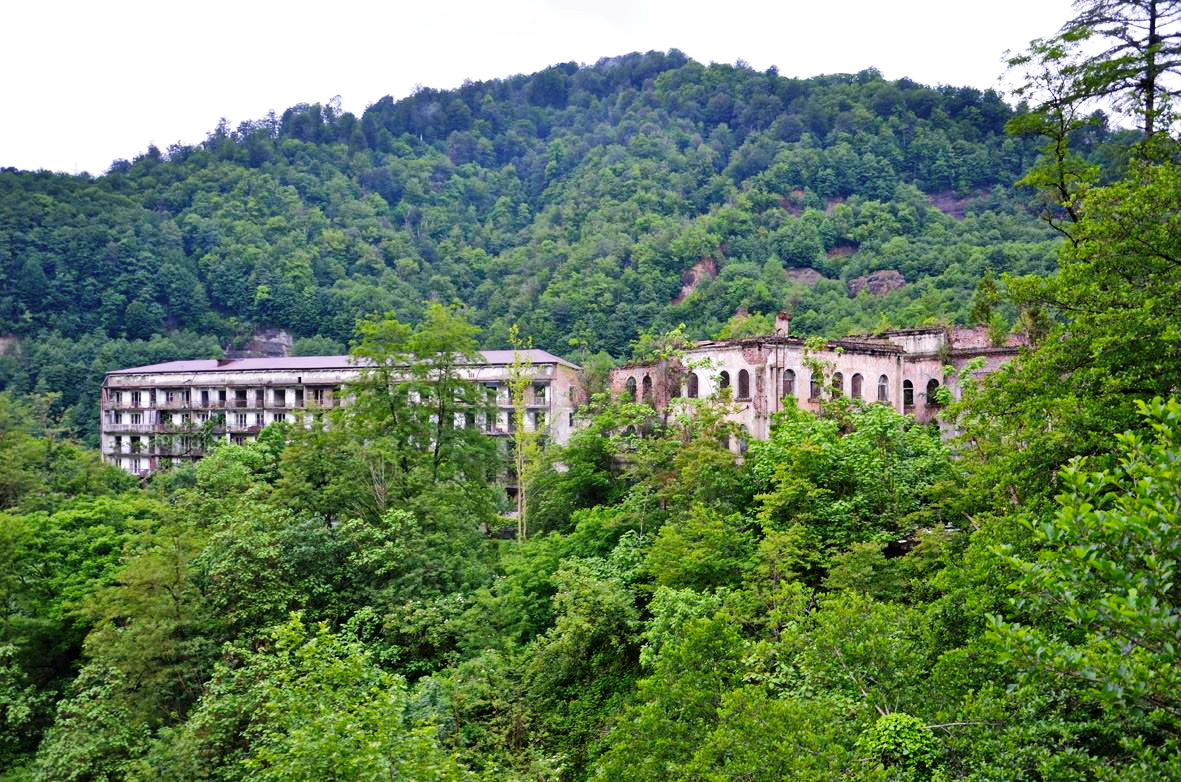
The town of Akarmara in Abkhazia, Georgia, was abandoned in the early 1990s.

- Armazi, the original capital of the country, was destroyed in AD 736 by the Arab invader Marwan ibn Muhammad and never rebuilt, apart from a church, built in the 12th century but later abandoned. The ruins are now protected.
- Ochamchire was a city of 18,700 people in 1978 but was left largely abandoned by the ethnic cleansing of Georgians in 1992–1993.
- Tkvarcheli is a coal mining town that suffered a drastic population decline as a result of the war in Abkhazia.

=== India ===
- Dhanushkodi, on Pamban Island, was a flourishing tourist town until it was wiped out by the 1964 Dhanushkodi cyclone.
- Fatehpur Sikri was briefly the capital of the Mughal Empire, but was abandoned soon after its completion, and is now a UNESCO World Heritage Site.
- Mandu is a fortress town in Madhya Pradesh, dating back at least as far as 555 AD.
- Old Goa was once the center of Christianization in the east, but it became largely abandoned in the 17th century, due to an outbreak of malaria and cholera.
- Ross Island was the administrative center of the Andaman and Nicobar Islands until the 1941 Andaman Islands earthquake, leaving the settlement in ruins.
- Vijayanagara was possibly the second-largest city in the world in 1500, with around 500,000 inhabitants. It was captured and destroyed by Muslim armies in 1565, and has been abandoned ever since. Hampi is a World Heritage Site within this town.
- Lakhpat was once a bustling port town at the mouth of Kori creek of Kutch. After the earthquake of 1819, the Indus River changed its course of flow resulting in the abandonment of the port by people. The town surrounded by a 7-kilometre-long (4.3 mi) fort wall now houses only a few hundred people and a large number of ruined buildings.
- Bhangarh Fort, a 17th-century fort built by King Sawai Madho Singh in Rajasthan was abandoned following a curse, according to legends.
- Kuldhara is an abandoned town near Jaisalmer, Rajasthan.
- Prabalgad, a hill fort near Matheran, Maharashtra which was abandoned due to its difficult access and scarcity of water.
- Madh Fort near Mumbai is a small fort that is in disuse following a decline in its importance.
- Golconda Fort near Hyderabad was a fort city and the seat of the Qutb Shahi dynasty was destroyed after defeating by Mughal emperor Aurangzeb.

=== Indonesia ===
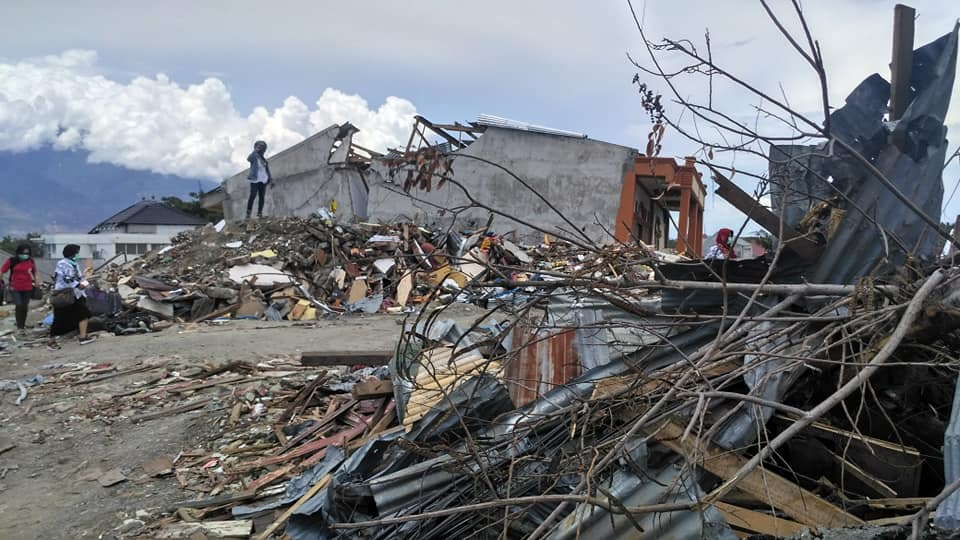
Petobo, Central Sulawesi

- Berastepu, a village in Karo Regency, North Sumatra, was abandoned due to 2013 eruptions of Mount Sinabung.
- Lubuk Laweh, a village in Padang Pariaman Regency, West Sumatra, was destroyed following the 2009 Sumatra earthquakes. It has since been treated as a mass grave of the victims.
- Petobo, a village in Palu, Central Sulawesi, was destroyed by the liquefaction of the 2018 Sulawesi earthquake and tsunami.

=== Iran ===
- Soltaniyeh was the 14th century capital of the Mongol Ilkhanid rulers of Persia, but is now "a deserted, crumbling spread of ruins".

=== Japan ===
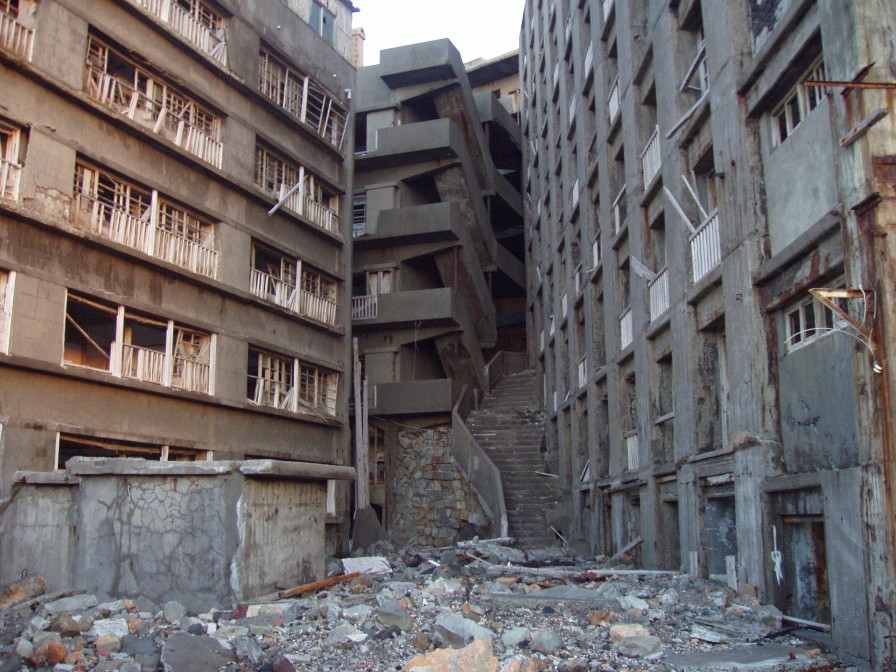
Hashima Island, Japan

- Hashima Island was a Japanese mining town from 1887 to 1974. Once known for having the world's highest population density (in 1959 at 83,500 inhabitants per square kilometre or 216,000 inhabitants per square mile), the island was abandoned when the coal mines were closed down.
- Ōkuma, Fukushima was a large Japanese town with a population of 11,515 people. It was completely evacuated along with the 20 km/12 miles (30 km/19 miles voluntarily) zone surrounding the nuclear plant in the aftermath of the Fukushima nuclear disaster.
- Ikeshima Island was a mining town in Nagasaki Prefecture. The town had an estimated population of over 10,000, but after the coal mines closure in 2001 thousands left. In 2018 it had a population of 130.

=== Kazakhstan ===
- Chagan, former Soviet air base and urban settlement.
- Malye Kamkaly, Baytal and Aral were abolished in 2019.

=== Kyrgyzstan ===
- Balykchy, a lakeside town. Though maintaining a large population, the town has declined significantly from its former industrial power.
- Engilchek, an old Soviet mining town.
- Ming Kush, a Soviet uranium mining town that declined from 20,000 to 3,600 residents.
- Sary-Jaz

=== Laos ===
- Boten, once a hub of gambling and crime, turned into an underpopulated development by casino shutdowns and Chinese economic decisions.
- Loechon, also known as Lakhon, an ancient abandoned city near Thakhek.

=== Lebanon ===
- Bjerrine, in the Byblos District, was a town with a silk factory that was abandoned during the great famine under Ottoman control during World War I. Urban legends say that all of the villagers were on the same boat to America when it sank, taking the town's history with it.
- Ain el-Halazoun, a Christian village that was destroyed during the Lebanese Civil War. The village's sole inhabitant was a former resident who returned to his decimated hometown, shown in the 2008 documentary "The One Man Village".

=== Malaysia ===
- Bukit Kutu is a former hill station that was abandoned after being bombed by the Japanese army during World War II.
- Bukit Besi is a former mining town in Terengganu, Malaysia. The population dropped drastically after 1971 when the Eastern Mining and Metal Corporation (EMMCO) closed their operation because the iron ore there was exhausted.
- Kampung Kepayang, in Perak, is almost uninhabited, with only two or three shophouses being in use. This is a result of the widening of the main road, which made it difficult to park a vehicle and resulted in the shops losing business. However, there are still Malays who reside in the village houses behind the shophouses, and the addresses in Simpang Pulai are still written as "Kampung Kepayang".
- Sungai Lembing, Pahang, Malaysia.
- Pekan Papan was once-thriving mining town in Pusing, Perak.

=== North Korea ===
- Kijong-dong, a fake town set up near the border with South Korea to give the illusion of prosperity.
- Kumgang, a South Korean tourist complex in North Korea where families separated by the border would meet each other. After political tensions prevented families from using Kumgang to meet, it rapidly lost visitors.

=== Oman ===
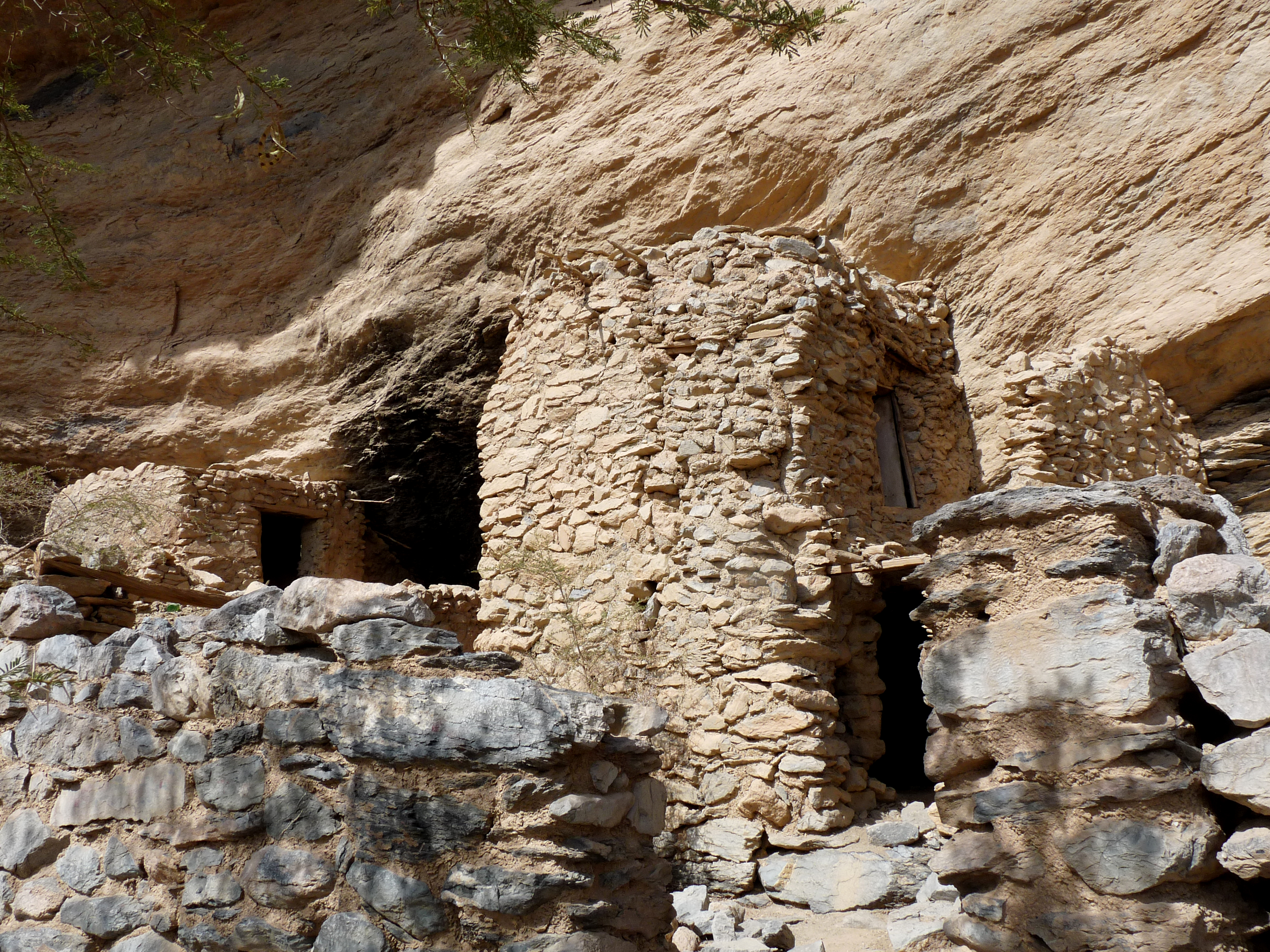
Abandoned houses in Sap Bani Khamis, Oman.

- Sap Bani Khamis is an abandoned village halfway up a canyon, accessible only by a narrow path.

=== Palestine ===
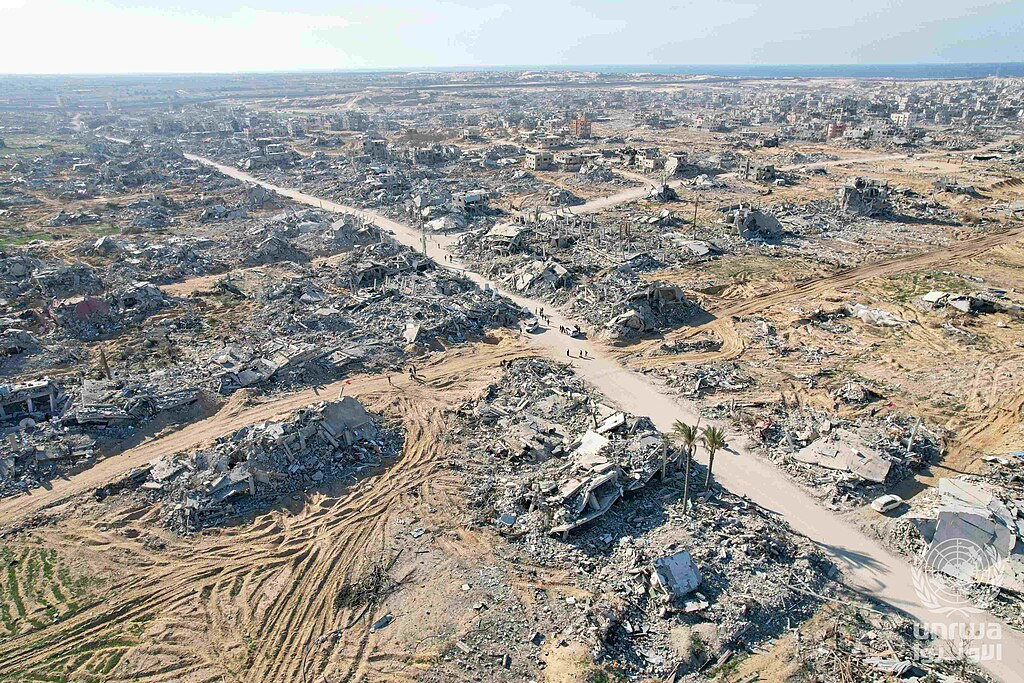
The flattened city of Rafah, Gaza Strip.

==== West Bank ====
- The Old City of Hebron has been largely emptied of its Palestinian population due to the Israeli–Palestinian conflict. Since 1997, the city has been divided into H1, under Palestinian control, and H2, under Israeli military control; the latter is subject to strict movement restrictions, shop closures, and military checkpoints that have emptied the historic city center. Shuhada Street, once a thriving commercial hub, is particularly affected.

==== Gaza Strip ====
- Following the outbreak of the Gaza War, most of Gaza's cities have been destroyed by the Israeli military, with places like Rafah, Khan Yunis, Al-Mughraqa and Juhor ad Dik largely reduced to rubble and widely described as ghost towns.
- Bedolah, Bnei Atzmon, Dugit, Elei Sinai, Gadid, Gan Or, Ganei Tal, Katif, Kerem Atzmona, Kfar Darom, Kfar Yam, Morag, Netzarim, Neve Dekalim, Netzer Hazani, Nisanit, Pe'at Sade, Rafiah Yam, Slav, and Tel Katifa were Israeli settlements established from 1973 to 1990 in the Gaza Strip under the Hof Aza Regional Council; all were evacuated during Israel's unilateral disengagement in 2005.

=== Qatar ===
- Al-ʽArish is an old fishing village on the Northern coast of Qatar in the Middle East. Situated on the Persian Gulf, it was abandoned in the early 1970s and has since become a ghost town.

=== Russian Federation ===
- Butugychag is a former Gulag forced labor camp, and one of the few camps in which prisoners mined uranium.
- Khalmer-Yu is a former urban-type settlement in the Komi Republic, disestablished in 1995. In 1993 it was decided to shut down mining operations and to liquidate the settlement by 1995.
- Neftegorsk is a former town in Sakhalin Oblast that was almost destroyed in a 1995 earthquake and never rebuilt.
- Kadykchan is a former mining town in Magadan Oblast.
- Kyubyume in Yakutia.
- Naukan in Chukotka.
- Zvyozdny, Perkatkun and Ushakovskoye on Wrangel Island.

=== Saudi Arabia ===
- Old Town, Al-Ula, or al-Deera as it is locally called, is now all but a ghost town. It consists of a walled village of about 800 dwellings around the perimeter of the more ancient castle with narrow winding alleys, many of which are covered to shield the people from the heat of the sun. Most of the foundations of the buildings are stone, but the upper floors are made from mud bricks, while palm leaves and wood are used for the ceilings. Although many of these houses were probably rebuilt over time, their foundation is likely to be from the original construction of the town in the 13th century AD. 45 m (148 feet) above historic al-Ula, the town's Castle commands strategic views over the entire valley. It is sometimes referred to as the Castle of Musa bin Nusayr, the Umayyad-era army general who ruled over North Africa and was involved in conquering Andalusia in the early 8th century AD. He is said to have died in this castle on his way from Damascus to a pilgrimage in Mecca in 715 AD. Although the castle was rebuilt more than once during its long history, its origins date back to the 6th century BC. In fact, some of the foundation stones are from the original 2,600-year-old construction (according to signs posted). The castle is currently more of a bastion or watchtower once used to protect the town.
- Albaten
- Tharmida

=== Singapore ===
- A few blocks of HDB flats (apartment flats) located in the Lim Chu Kang area of the island is known to be the only ghost town in Singapore. Named the Neo Tiew Estate (or officially the Lim Chu Kang Rural Centre), it used to house residents before they were moved out of the vicinity in 2002 as part of an En-bloc scheme. Since then the Singapore government has declared it state land and nothing was done to demolish or renovate the flats. The area was used by the Singapore Army as a training facility from 2005–2009 until a newer training facility was built nearby in 2008. The facility was used most recently in 2012 when it was used to shoot scenes for the film Ah Boys to Men. As of today, its fate remains unknown.

=== Syria ===
- The city of Quneitra became a ghost town after the 1967 Six-Day War and subsequent Yom Kippur War in 1973. The United Nations has condemned Israel for Quneitra's destruction, while Israel blamed Syria for not rebuilding the city: the ruins were left in place, and a museum has been built to memorialize the destruction. Billboards are maintained at the ruins of many buildings and the town is effectively preserved in the condition that the wars left it in.

=== Taiwan ===
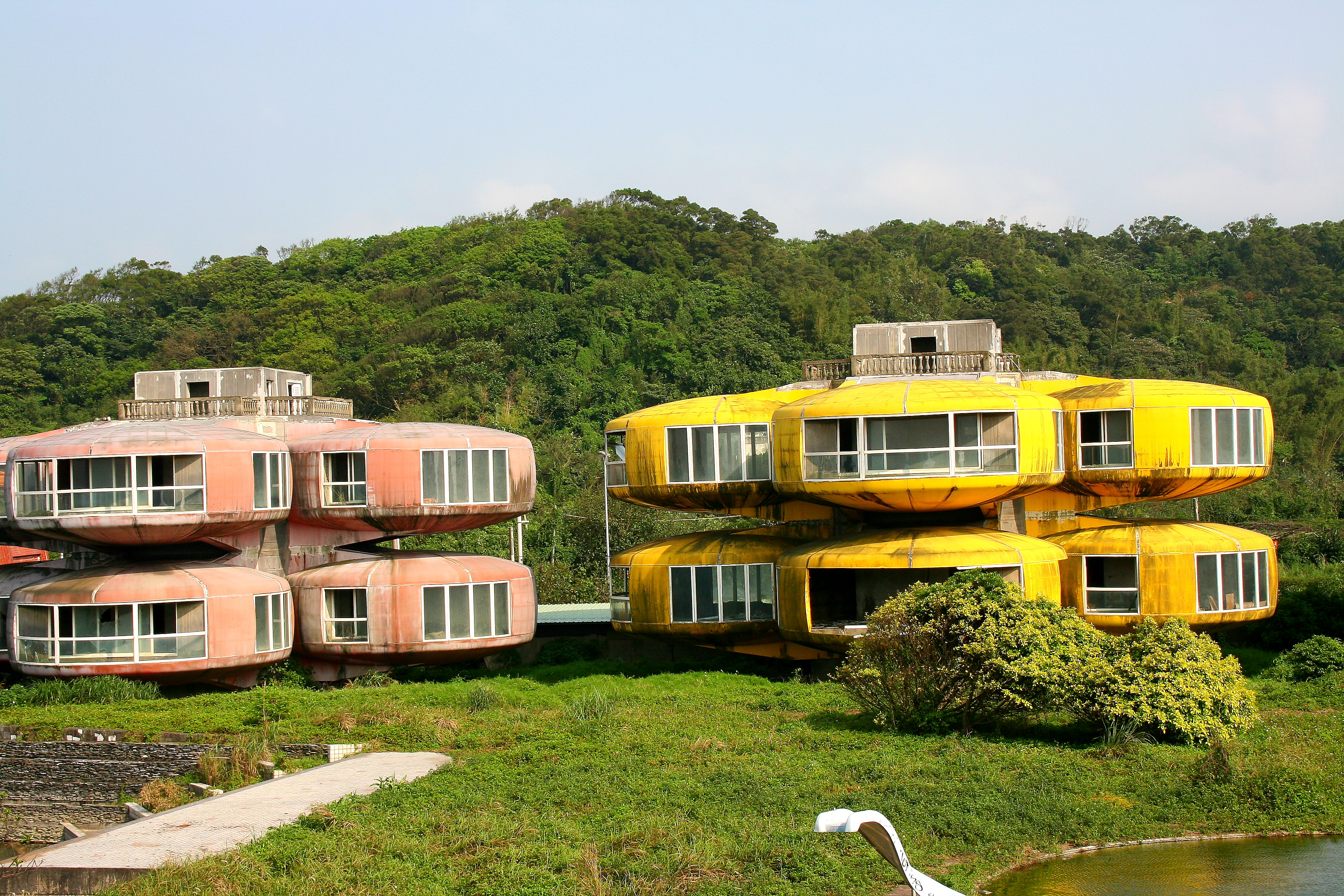
Two of the colorful pod-style buildings in New Taipei

- The Sanzhi UFO houses in Taiwan were a set of abandoned pod-shaped buildings built in New Taipei City as a vacation resort. They stood abandoned for thirty years before being demolished in 2010.

=== Tajikistan ===
- Alowmayn
- Chukkat
- Dahana
- Dehkalon
- Farkov
- Kansi
- Mushtif
- Petif
- Pushoytamen
- Shakhsara
- Simich
- Sokidara
- Tagob
- Varsaut
- Witikhon

Most of these abandoned villages are in the Anzob jamoat, part of the Ayni District. The cause of the decrease of population is unknown.

=== Thailand ===
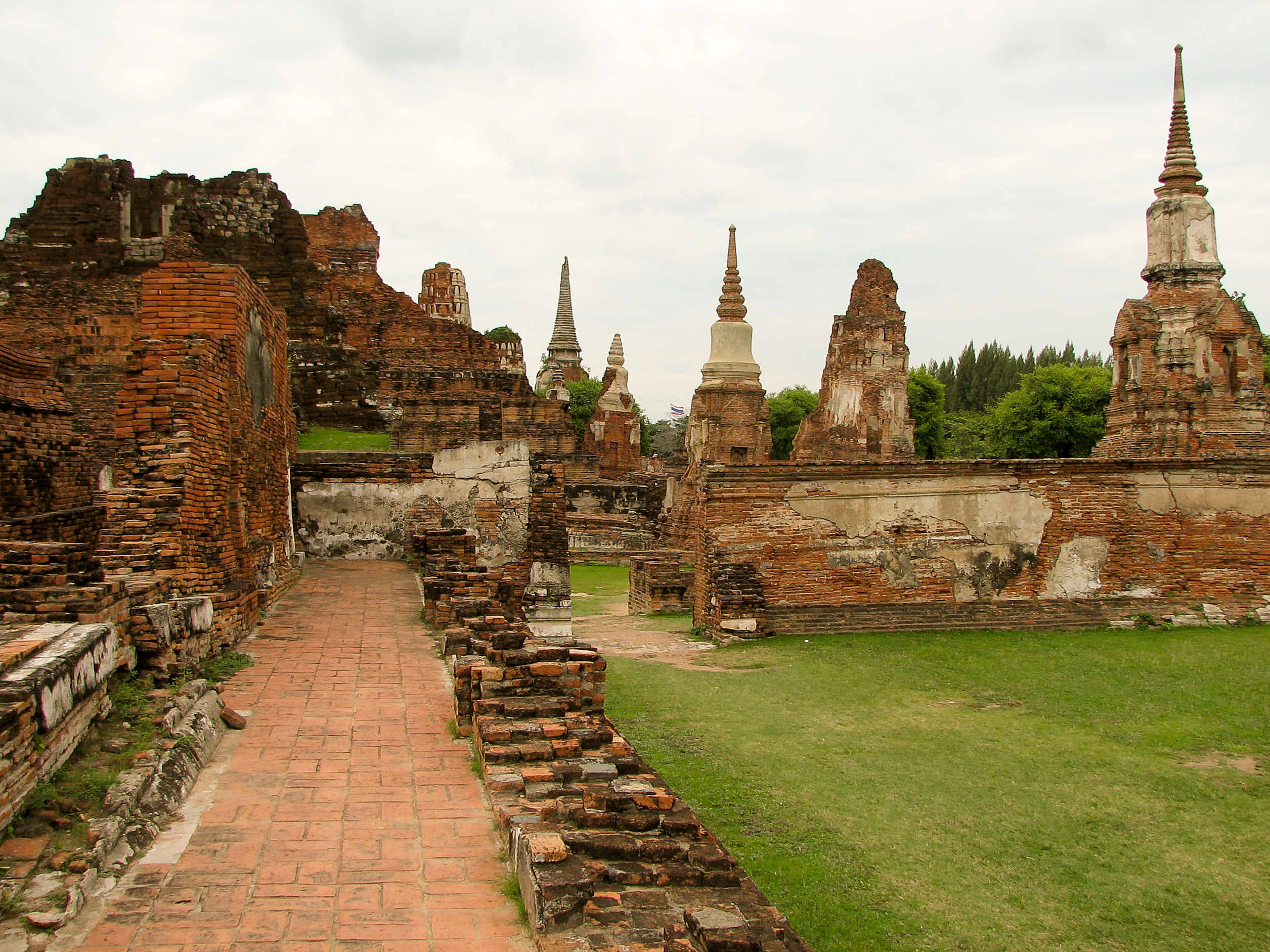
The ruins of old Ayutthaya, Thailand.

- The city of Old Ayutthaya was the capital of the country from its foundation in 1350 until it was sacked and destroyed by the Burmese in 1767. The site is now Ayutthaya Historical Park.

=== Turkey ===
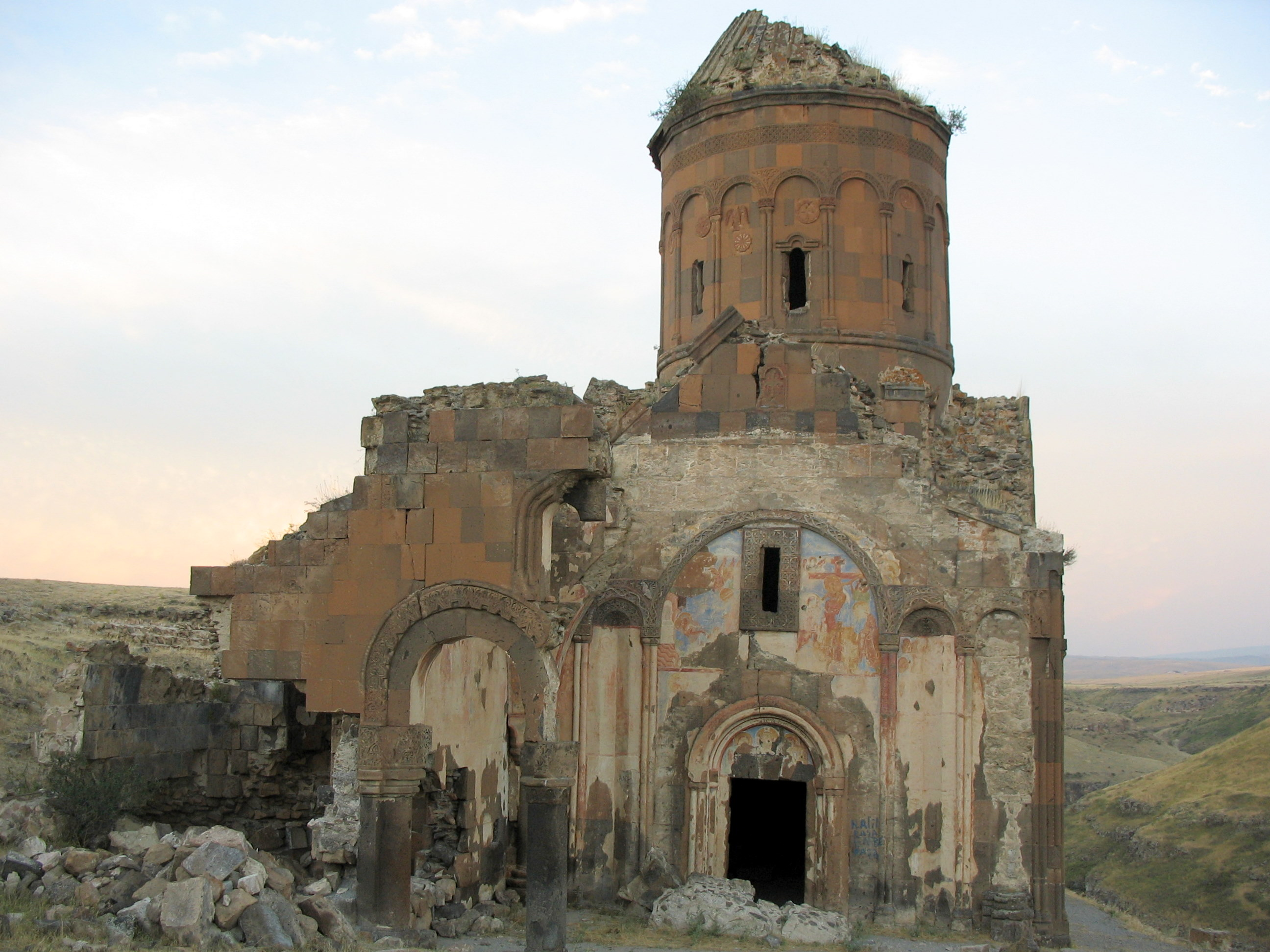
A ruined church in Ani, Turkey.

- Ani, in Kars Province, was once the capital of the Armenian Bagratuni kingdom. It has been abandoned since the eighteenth century and is now a museum town.
- Çökene in Büyükorhan district was a village until 2008. It is a site of empty houses after immigration to big cities due to money shortage and unemployment.
- Kayaköy was abandoned as a result of the 1923 population exchange between Turkey and Greece and is now preserved as a museum village.
- Sazak near Karaburun, a district of İzmir Province on the Aegean (western) coast of Turkey, was also inhabited by Greeks, which left the area according to the population exchange treaty. Nowadays Sazak is a total ghost town.

=== Uzbekistan ===
- Kantubek used to have a population of around 1,500 and housed scientists and employees for Aralsk-7, a biological weapons test site. It was abandoned in 1992 following the collapse of the Soviet Union.

=== United Arab Emirates ===
- Al Madam Buried Village also known as Sharjah Ghost Village is an abandoned village in the Emirate of Sharjah, United Arab Emirates, located in Al Madam. This village is located between the borders of Sharjah and Oman.

== Europe ==
=== Albania ===
- Qeparo

=== Austria ===
- The village of Döllersheim was evicted and demolished due to the construction of a Wehrmacht training ground.

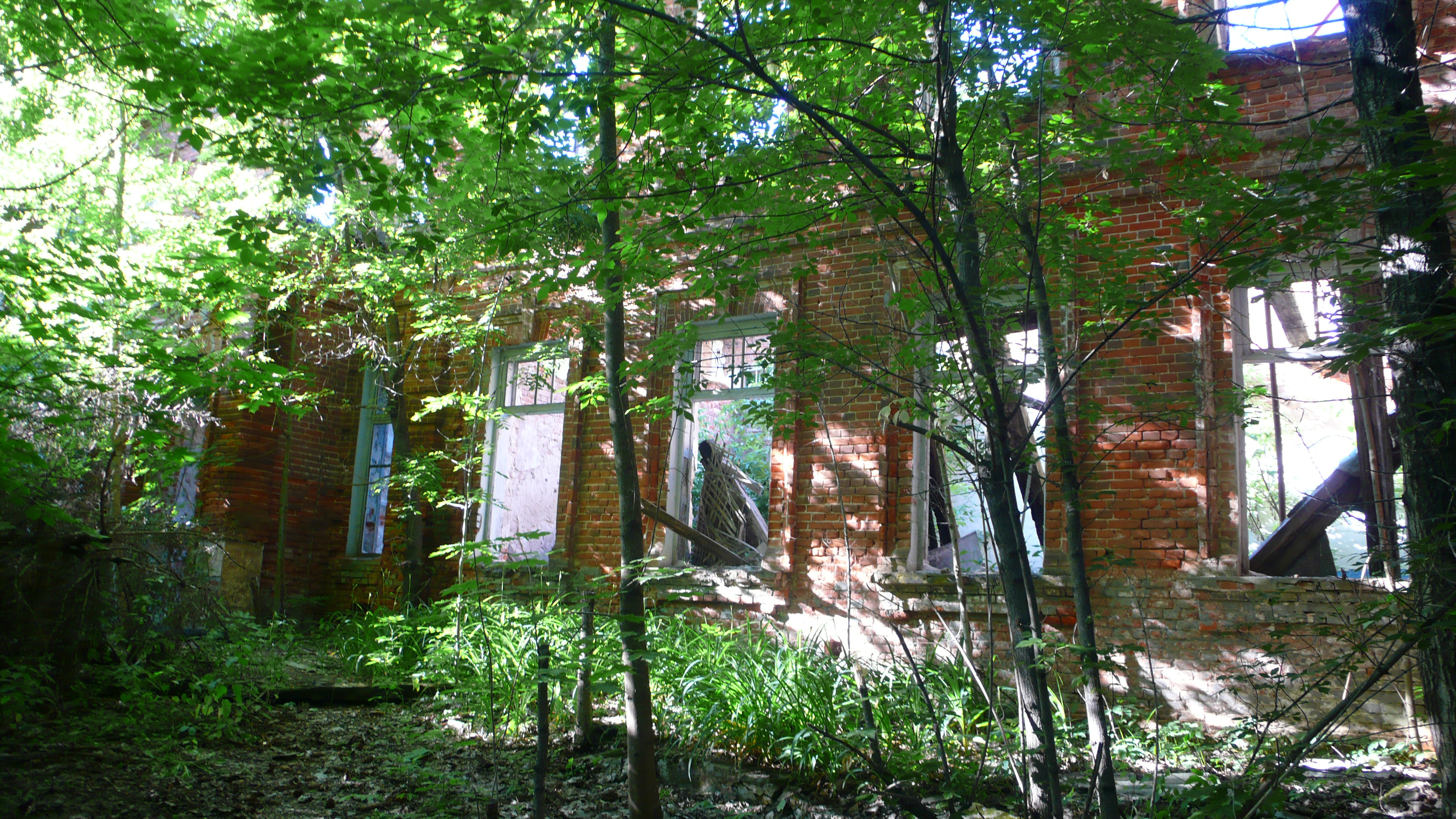
An abandoned building in the Polesie State Radioecological Reserve in Belarus

=== Belarus ===
Many Belarusian villages were abandoned as a result of the Chernobyl disaster in 1986. Most lie inside the Polesie State Radioecological Reserve, with approximately 470 abandoned villages in the reserve.

- Aravichy
- Babchin
- Dronki
- Dzernavichy
- Krasnoselye
- Malodusha, which has a memorial to local children who were killed in 1959 by an unexploded mine left during World War II.
- Solnechny
- Vygribnaya Sloboda
- Zherdnoye

=== Belgium ===
- Doel is a village in Beveren that was partly abandoned and demolished to make way for the expanding of the Port of Antwerp-Bruges.

=== Bulgaria ===
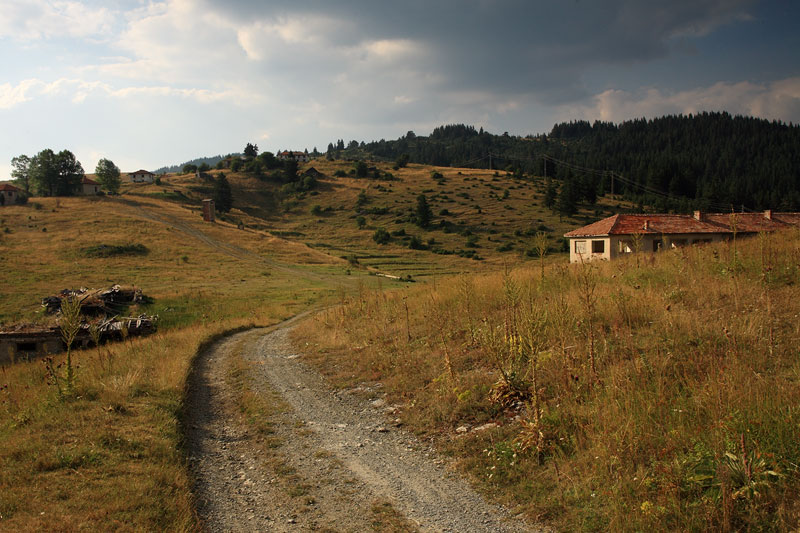
Chamla, in Bulgaria

According to the Institute for Research of Population and People at the Bulgarian Academy of Sciences (BAS), Bulgaria has over 500 ghost towns. Rapid rural decay since the fall of communism has seen a sharp decline in village populations, which the BAS says that without intervention, will lead to no more villages in Bulgaria by 2060.

- Chamla is an abandoned village in the Smolyan municipality
- Dolna Melna, near the Serbian border.
- Dragostin is an abandoned village in Gotse Delchev that was erased from the registers in 2008.
- Kanitz, a village in northwest Bulgaria with 4 residents as of 2019.
- Kashle, near the Serbian border.
- Paramun, whose aging elderly residents are causing the population to dramatically decline.
- Skipkovitza, near the Serbian border.
- Skomlya, with approximately 12 permanent residents compared to a former population of 200.
- Sredna is an abandoned village in Gotse Delchev that was erased from the registers in 2008.
- Valchek, which has only 20 elderly residents.
- Zaim Chiflik

=== Bosnia and Herzegovina ===
- Baljci, Tomislavgrad, is a village that became abandoned after the Bosnian War.
- Jukići
- Milodraž, a medieval village that is today located in Pobrđe Milodraž, Kiseljak.
- Vranduk, a village in Doboj that faced a similar fate as Baljci.
- Ledići, an almost abandoned village with only two people, Obren Miovćić, and his wife Dragana. The village had a similar fate as Vranduk and Baljci.
- Mracna Gora
- Orlište
- Srebrenica, although still inhabited, never significantly recovered from the 1995 massacre.
- Tovarnica

=== Czech Republic ===
- Boží Dar, a part of Milovice-Mladá is an abandoned military town in the territory of Milovice, northeast of Prague. It was abandoned following the Velvet Revolution in 1989, and ownership of the town transferred to the Czech government in 1992. It remained uninhabited until March 2014 when work was started to demolish it. Most of the dilapidated buildings (over 40 buildings) were razed to the ground in 2014 and 2015. The Central Bohemian Region had the dangerous ruins full of asbestos and clutter removed. Only a handful of buildings remain from the original housing estate, but many buildings have been renovated into modern apartment complexes.

=== Estonia ===
- Ahitsa
- Horosuu
- Kopli Lines, a former working-class neighborhood in Tallinn that has become largely abandoned and derelict following the Soviet era.
- Sirgala, a former mining town near Kohtla-Järve with a similar story to Viivikonna.
- Viivikonna, near Kohtla-Järve, similar to Sirgala, is a former mining towns that started to lose its population after local oil shale reserves were depleted and the industry moved eastwards. By the 21st century, both towns had only a handful of people left, struggling to find a new place to live.

=== Faroe Islands ===
- Blankskáli, Kalsoy, after an avalanche hit the village in 1809, the entire village resettled in the new settlement Syðradalur on the same island. The village was finally abandoned ca. 1815.
- Fossá, Borðoy, abandoned since 1945.
- Múli, a town on Borðoy, has been considered abandoned since 2002.
- Skarð, on Kunoy, was steadily depopulated from 1913 to 1919, after all the men of the village drowned while out fishing.
- Skarvanes is a village on Sandoy, that has been abandoned since the last permanent resident died in 2000.
- Skálatoftir is the northwesternmost village on Borðoy.
- Slættanes is a town on Vágar that was abandoned in 1965.
- Strond, located north of Ánir, has been abandoned since 1930.
- Víkar, a town on Vágar, has been abandoned since 1910.
- Víkarbyrgi, on Suðuroy, was abandoned in 2003.

=== Finland ===
- Jussarö is an old village near the Jussarö mines.

=== France ===
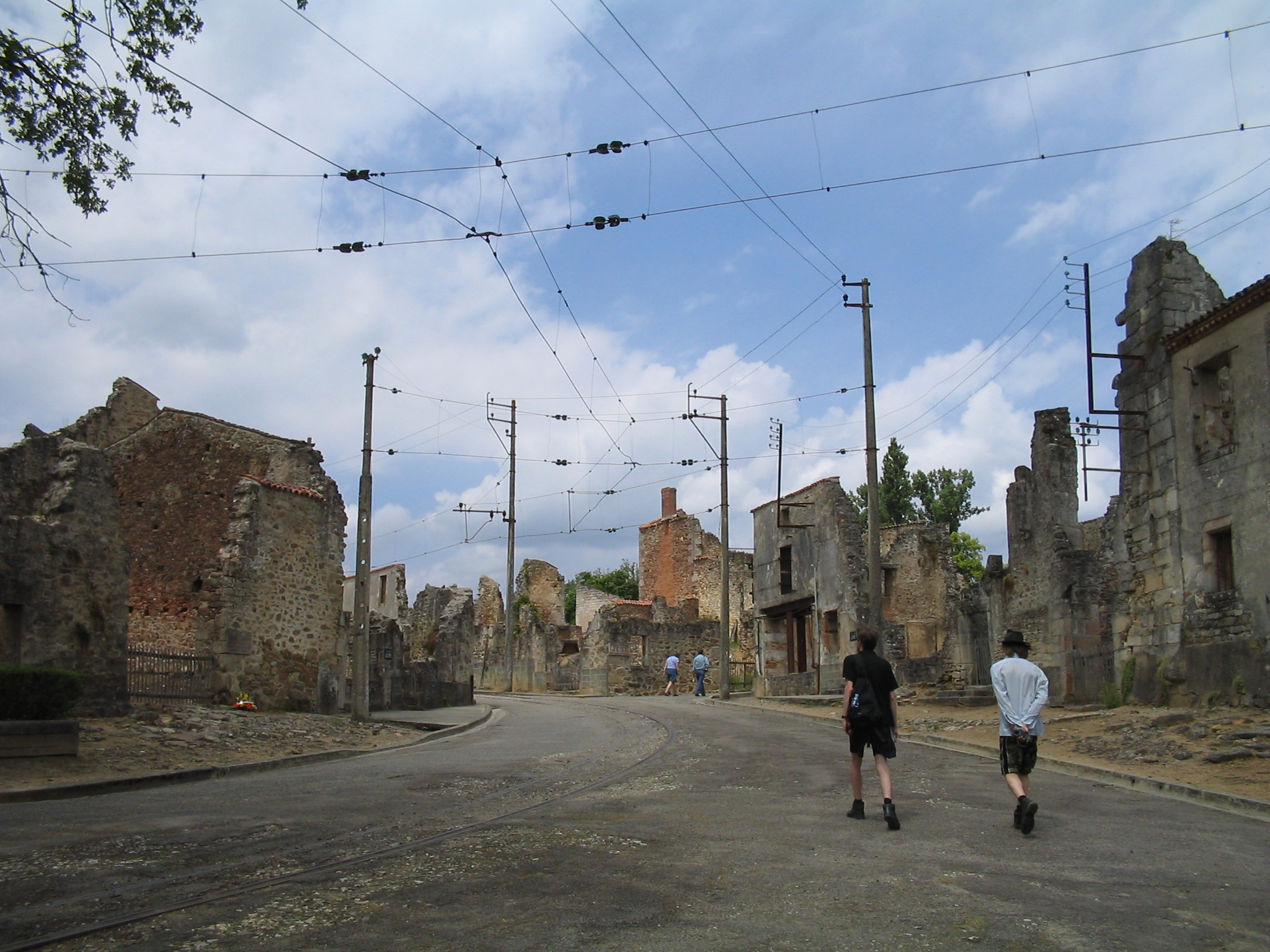
Main street of Oradour-sur-Glane, France, unchanged since the German massacre.

- Six of the French villages destroyed in World War I have never been rebuilt. All are found in the département of Meuse, and were destroyed during the Battle of Verdun in 1916:
  - Beaumont-en-Verdunois
  - Bezonvaux
  - Cumières-le-Mort-Homme
  - Fleury-devant-Douaumont
  - Haumont-près-Samogneux
  - Louvemont-Côte-du-Poivre
- Brovès, in Var, was forcibly evacuated in the 1970s for the building of a military camp. All residents were evicted by 1974.
- Celles, in Hérault, was evacuated in preparation for it to be flooded by the construction of a dam, which ultimately never came to fruition.
- Courbefy, in Haute-Vienne, which was famously bought in 2012
- Le Poil, in Alpes-de-Haute-Provence, which was slowly depopulated due to being too remote and was a ghost town by 1930.
- Oradour-sur-Glane was destroyed by a Waffen-SS battalion during World War II and its population massacred. The village was subsequently rebuilt nearby, but the ruins of the old village have been preserved.

=== Germany ===
- Bonnland, Gruorn, Lopau, Wollseifen and others are ghost towns created as part of the creation of military training areas.

=== Greece ===
- The island of Spinalonga is considered by some to be a ghost town. Serving as a leper colony for the first half of the 20th century, the island was abandoned when all its inhabitants were cured. By 1962 there were no permanent residents left. In recent years Spinalonga has become a tourist attraction as one of the last leper colonies to be closed down in Europe.
- Gavros, Kranionas and Ano Kraniounas are all abandoned villages located near Kastoria and Lake Prespa.
- The castle of Kato Chora is located near the village of Mylopotamos, Kythera.
- Old Perithia (or Palea Perithia) is a ghost village on the northern side of Corfu on the slopes of Mount Pantokrator. The village was originally established in the 14th century, during Byzantine times due to the need of people to move from the coastal side and protect themselves from pirate and enemy attacks. Moreover, the diseases caused by mosquitoes on the coast drove residents to the mountain. When piracy was confronted from the Mediterranean Sea in the late 19th century, some inhabitants started to gradually move to the coasts where tourism had also started to develop.
- Ropoto, a more recent ghost town created 2012 by a landslide.

=== Hungary ===
- Derenk was destroyed by the government in 1943, so that the area could be used for hunting.
- Gyertyánvölgy was one of the four settlements created by the workers of the glass huts founded in the 18th century. The other three settlements were Óhuta (today Bükkszentlászló), Újhuta (today Bükkszentkereszt) and Répáshuta (which still exists). The last glass hut operated here until 1897; the village was still inhabited at the beginning of the 20th century. In its cemetery, the first burial was in 1843, and the last in 1926.
- Gyűrűfű was repopulated in the form of an eco-village.
- Hertelendyújhely
- Iharkút: its fate was sealed by the discovery of the bauxite wealth below. The extraction started in 1979. The village's last inhabitants were moved to Bakonyjákó, Németbánya, Herend and Pápa.
- Jásztelekpuszta: its fate is similar to Kápolnapuszta.
- Kakpuszta: the inhabitants were moved because of the lack of road construction and electrification.
- Kápolnapuszta: the 2nd Ukrainian Reconnaissance Front of the Red Army exterminated nearly the entire population on 16 March 1945.
- Márcadópuszta
- Mónosokor
- Nagyecsér, the most famous ghost town in Hungary. It was abandoned following school closure, an aging population, and the population leaving; the road to Mezőnagymihály was never built.
- Nagygéc, was totally destroyed by the 1970s Szamos flooding; there is now a memorial park for the town.
- Révfalu, an isolated village, nowadays a popular tourist destination.
- Somogyszentimre
- Szentkirályszabadja, although the village is still populated, a small city sized Soviet military base is totally abandoned next to it. The settlement also has an airport, as well as panel buildings, shops, cinema, theater, kindergarten, and school for the families of the soldiers. The area was left when the soviet soldiers were withdrawn from Hungary in 1990. The airport operates to this day. This base is often called the Hungarian Chernobyl.
- Vágotpuszta
- Zelemér, the Tatars ravaged whole of Northern Hungary including this village, which failed to revive.
- Zsörk, the second-most famous ghost town in the country.

=== Iceland ===
- The former village of Súðavík, in the Westfjords, a remote region of northwestern Iceland. In 1995, an avalanche fell on the small village, resulting in 14 fatalities. It was later decided that the location of the town was unsafe for year-round occupation. It has been forbidden ever since to live in the old town permanently. A new village was built from the ground up a few miles away from the old site in a safer location.

=== Republic of Ireland ===
- Miners' Village, Glendalough, County Wicklow was a small village based around a galena mine. The village was largely inhabited from 1825 to 1957 when the mine closed permanently.
- Great Blasket Island, County Kerry, was evacuated in 1953 after being repeatedly cut off from the mainland due to poor weather. Its 160 residents were relocated to the mainland by the government.
- Innisfallen Island is the site of Innisfallen Abbey, once home to Finian Lobhar.
- Rindoon, County Roscommon, was deserted by the 14th century.
- Slievemore is a deserted village on Achill Island.
- Scattery Island is the site of a former village and monastery, and was once the home of Saint Senan.

=== Italy ===
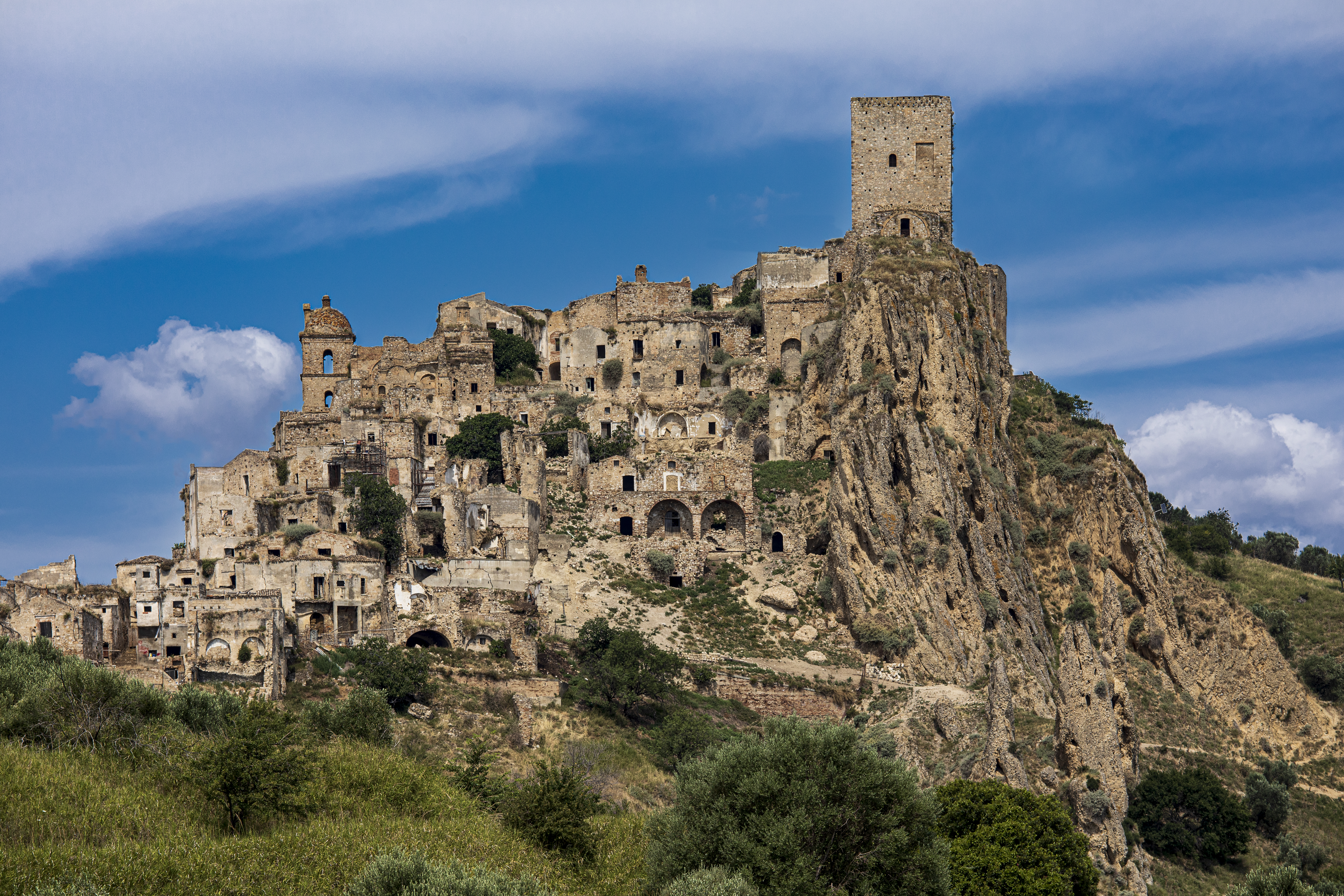
Craco, Italy

- Alianello is a village in Aliano municipality, evacuated after the 1980 Irpinia earthquake.
- Argentiera is a former mining town in Sassari that suffered a population decline after World War II.
- Avi, in Piedmont.
- Balestrino, a town and municipality in Liguria whose old town was abandoned in 1953.
- Bussana Vecchia is a town in Liguria that was abandoned following an earthquake in 1887.
- Campomaggiore Vecchio was a town in Potenza that was destroyed by an avalanche in 1885. The modern town of Campomaggiore has replaced it.
- Cirella Vecchia is the old town of Cirella.
- Civita di Bagnoregio is a town in Lazio that declined over the 16th and 17th centuries.
- Connio Vecchio (Old Connio), Piedmont.
- Consonno, Olginate.
- Craco, in the province of Matera, was depopulated in the middle of the 20th century, due to a landslide and the subsequent emigration. The abandonment has made Craco a popular filming location for movies such as The Nativity Story, The Passion of the Christ and Quantum of Solace.
- Curon in South Tyrol, the original site of which was flooded under Reschensee during its construction in 1950.
- Graun in South Tyrol, the original site of which was flooded under Reschensee during its construction in 1950.
- Herculaneum was mostly destroyed and buried under of ash and pumice in the eruption of Mount Vesuvius in 79 AD.
- Melito Vecchio (Old Melito), Avellino.
- Monteruga, Apulia.
- Pentedattilo, in Calabria, was severely damaged by the 1783 Calabrian earthquakes, and was completely abandoned by the 1960s.
- Poggioreale is a town in Sicily that was destroyed by the 1968 Belice earthquake.
- Pompeii was mostly destroyed and buried under of ash and pumice in the eruption of Mount Vesuvius in 79 AD.
- Poveglia is an abandoned island that was once a quarantine station for Plague Victims and other victims of several diseases up until the 20th century.
- Reschen in South Tyrol, the original site of which was flooded under Reschensee during its construction in 1950.
- Roghudi Vecchio, in Calabria.
- Roveraia, ghost village situated near Pratovalle, in the municipality of Loro Ciuffenna, in province of Arezzo, in Tuscany. The presence of the village is attested since the Middle Ages, when there was a tower. During World War II it was an important partisan base, reason why the village was destroyed by the German army. After the war the village was rebuilt. It was abandoned between the 1960s and the 1980s, when the last family who lived here left the village. Two projects have been proposed for the recovery of the village: in 2011 the proposal of Movimento Libero Perseo "Roveraia eco - lab", based on sustainability, and in 2019 there was a proposal aiming to recover the village with a mix of functions called "Ecomuseum of Pratomagno".

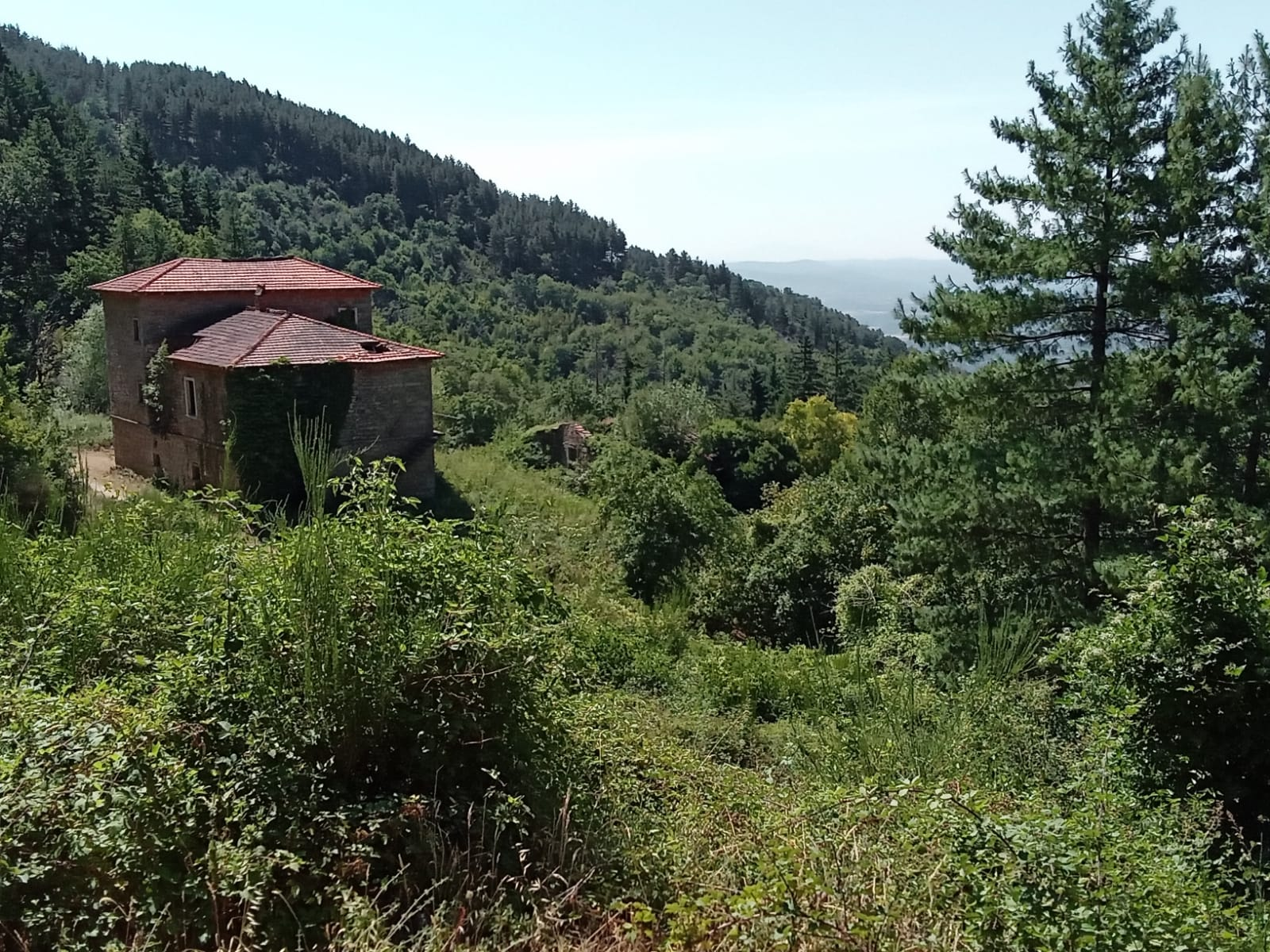
Ghost village of Roveraia

- San Martino Monteneve in the province of Bolzano was a mining town at 2,355 m (7,726 feet) above sea level between the Ridanna Valley and the Passirio Valley. It sits atop of mining tunnels running from one valley to the other. It is now part of the Monteneve mining museum.
- Tocco Caudio, in Benevento, was abandoned following the 1980 Irpinia earthquake.
- Leri Cavour is an abandoned village in Piedmont, situated next to a defunct nuclear reactor. Its most impressive building is the mansion of Camillo Cavour, who is famous for his efforts in creating a united Italy.

=== Latvia ===
- Skrunda-1, the site of a former Soviet Hen House radar installation, is a ghost town that was auctioned off in its entirety in early 2010.
- Irbene, the site of a former Soviet secret radar center "Звезда".

=== Lithuania ===
- Konstantinava, a small village in Rokiškis municipality with an abandoned vocational school and nearby student residences. Due to a declining population, the school and all the apartments were deserted. Today, only a few people still live in the village.

=== Netherlands ===
Many villages in the Netherlands were lost to the sea, see List of settlements lost to floods in the Netherlands for the complete list.

- Schokland, this was a very large island in the Middle Ages, but due to the rising sea level and major erosion from the Zuiderzee, the island became smaller and smaller. After a flood in 1825, life on the island was deemed too dangerous, and the two villages on the island: Emmeloord and Ens were abandoned. When the Noordoostpolder was created, Schokland became a landlocked elevation. The names Emmeloord and Ens were later used for villages in the newly created polder.
- Waterdunen, this town was lost to the North Sea in 1357. Later when the land was reclaimed the town was rebuilt, only to be lost again a century later. One of many Dutch villages to be lost to the North Sea, list of flooded villages in Zeeland.
- Bommenede, the village was flooded on 26 January 1682. The destruction was so great, that the Estates of Holland decided not to rebuild the village, and the last inhabitants left in 1684. Some remains of the village (now sometimes referred to as Oud-Bommenede) still remain visible. Nowadays, there is still some overgrown debris in the waters of the Grevelingen.

=== Norway ===
- Pyramiden ("The Pyramid") was a Russian settlement and coal mining community on the archipelago of Svalbard. It was founded by Sweden in 1910, and sold to the Soviet Union in 1927. The settlement, with a onetime population of 1,000 inhabitants, was abandoned in the late 1990s by its owner, the state-owned Soviet company Trust Artikugol, and is now a ghost town.

=== Poland ===
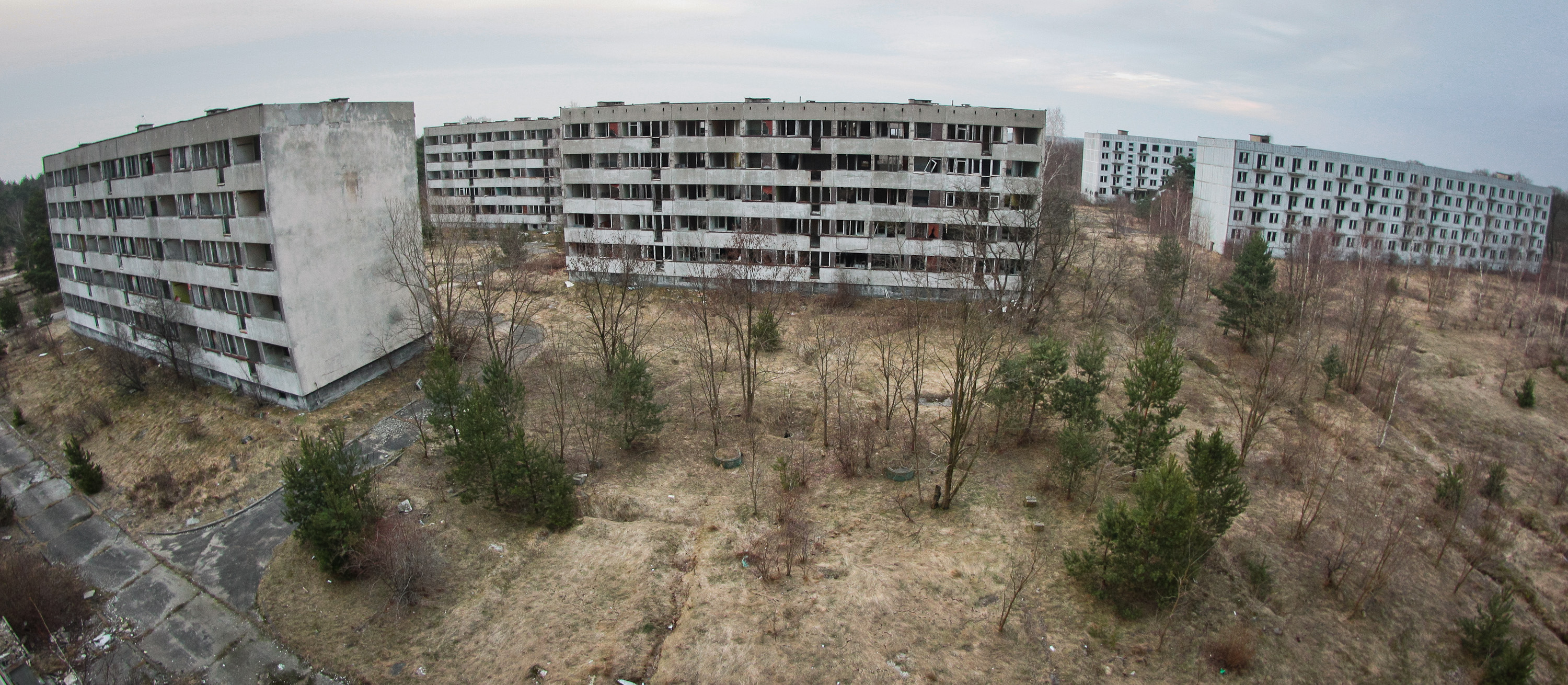
Pstrąże

- Czerwona Woda ("Red Water") in Kłodzko Valley was established by German immigrants before WWII. Most of the abandoned houses are found in the mountains of Klodzko Valley.
- Kłomino, near Borne Sulinowo in the northwest part of the country, was established as a place of residence for Soviet troops stationed in Poland with their families. The population was about 5,000. It was completely depopulated by 1992 after the collapse of the USSR. Only a few families live there now, but there are plans to repopulate the city.
- Pstrąże, near Bolesławiec in Lower Silesian Voivodeship, a Soviet Army garrison, deserted following the fall of the Soviet Union. Dubbed the "Polish Chernobyl" due to its ghost town status and alleged nuclear history.

Bieszczady National Park is home to several abandoned settlements:

- Beniowa
- Bukowiec
- Dydiowa
- Dźwiniacz Górny
- Krywka
- Łokieć
- Sianki
- Sokoliki Górskie
- Tarnawa Wyżna

=== Portugal ===
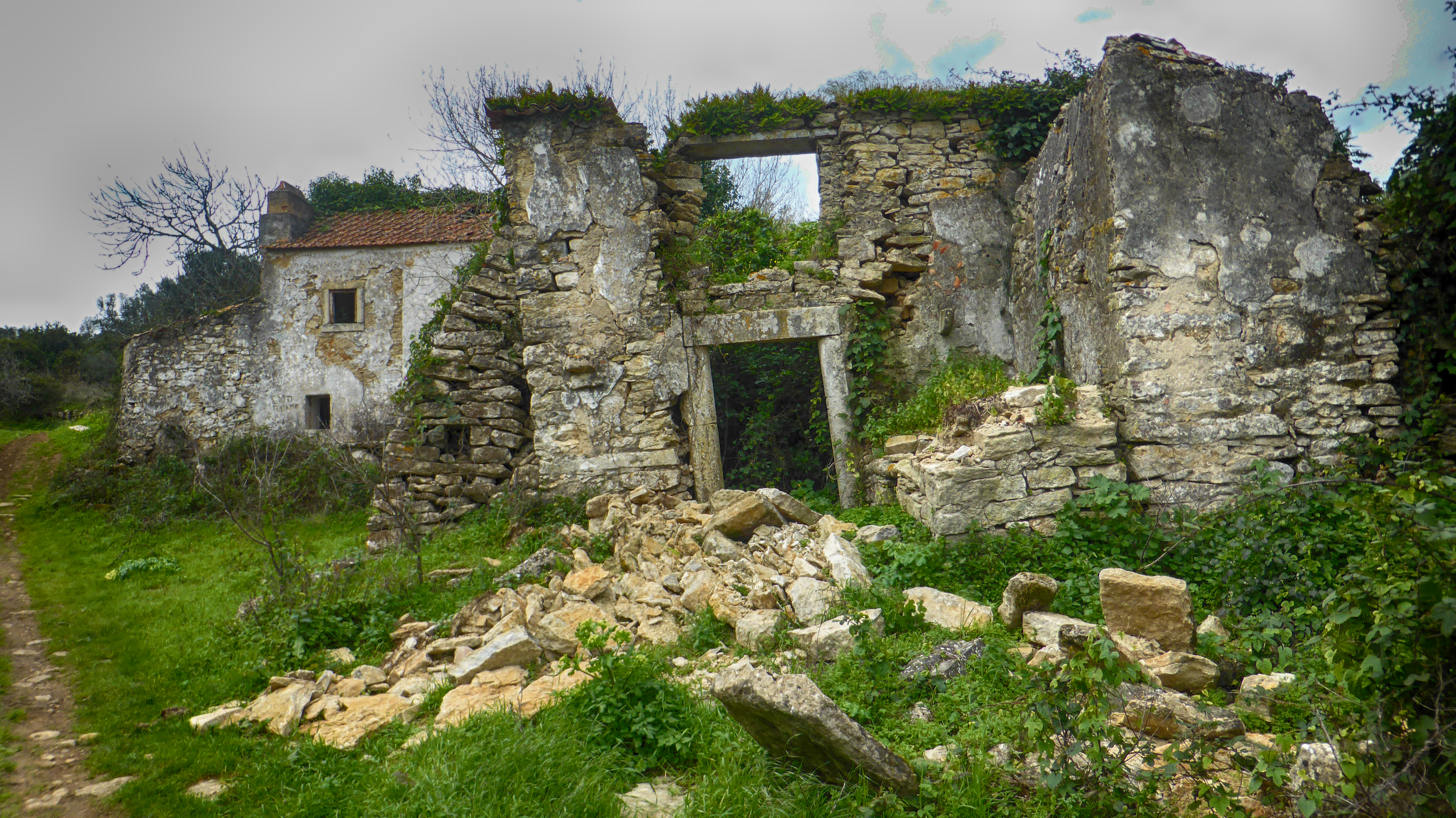
Broas village 2016

- Picões, in the freguesia of Bouçoães, Valpaços, Vila Real District
- Vilarinho da Furna, Terras de Bouro, at Braga District was a village with unique rules and way of life. It was abandoned and submerged in 1972 due to the building of Vilarinho das Furnas hydroelectric dam. When the lagoon water level is low the remains of the buildings can be seen.
- Aldeia de Broas, at Mafra Municipality, was officially considered abandoned when the last inhabitant died in late 1960 after being populated for centuries.

=== Romania ===
126 localities in Romania are "fictitious". They either have no inhabitants according to the last census, or they are actually in the bottom of an accumulation lake or have completely disappeared from the face of the earth. Some villages have no construction, no access roads, but they continue to remain in the official data bases of the Romanian state. Some of the localities that did not have any inhabitants at the 2011 census are:

- Baștea
- Bezidou Nou, flooded, the symbol of the Systematization
- Bold, flooded during the construction of Stânca-Costești Dam
- Bunești
- Cucu, destroyed during the floods of 14 May 1970
- Eteni, had the same fate as Cucu
- Ganaș
- Geamăna, flooded in 1978 by the Valea Șesii decant pond
- Gherdeal
- Giurcuța de Jos, flooded during the construction of Fântânele Dam
- Grabicina de Sus, moved in the second half of the 20th century due to landslides
- Incești
- Lindenfeld, depopulated since 1998, with the death of its last resident, Paul Schwirzenbeck
- Loțu
- Văgaș

=== Russian Federation ===
- Anufrievo is an abandoned village in Yaroslavl Oblast.
- Avdeyevo is an abandoned village in Yaroslavl Oblast.
- Ezhovo is a depopulated village in Yaroslavl Oblast.
- Novinki is a depopulated village in Yaroslavl Oblast.
- Panovo is a depopulated village in Yaroslavl Oblast.
- Petrovskoye is a depopulated village in Yaroslavl Oblast.
- Svinarikha is an abandoned village in Yaroslavl Oblast.
- Zayma-Novaya is an abandoned village in Yaroslavl Oblast.
- Zayma-Soboleva is an abandoned village in Yaroslavl Oblast.
- Gamsutl, one of the oldest settlements in Dagestan, abandoned in 2015.
- Mologa is a town in Yaroslavl Oblast that was flooded to create the Rybinsk Reservoir.

=== Spain ===
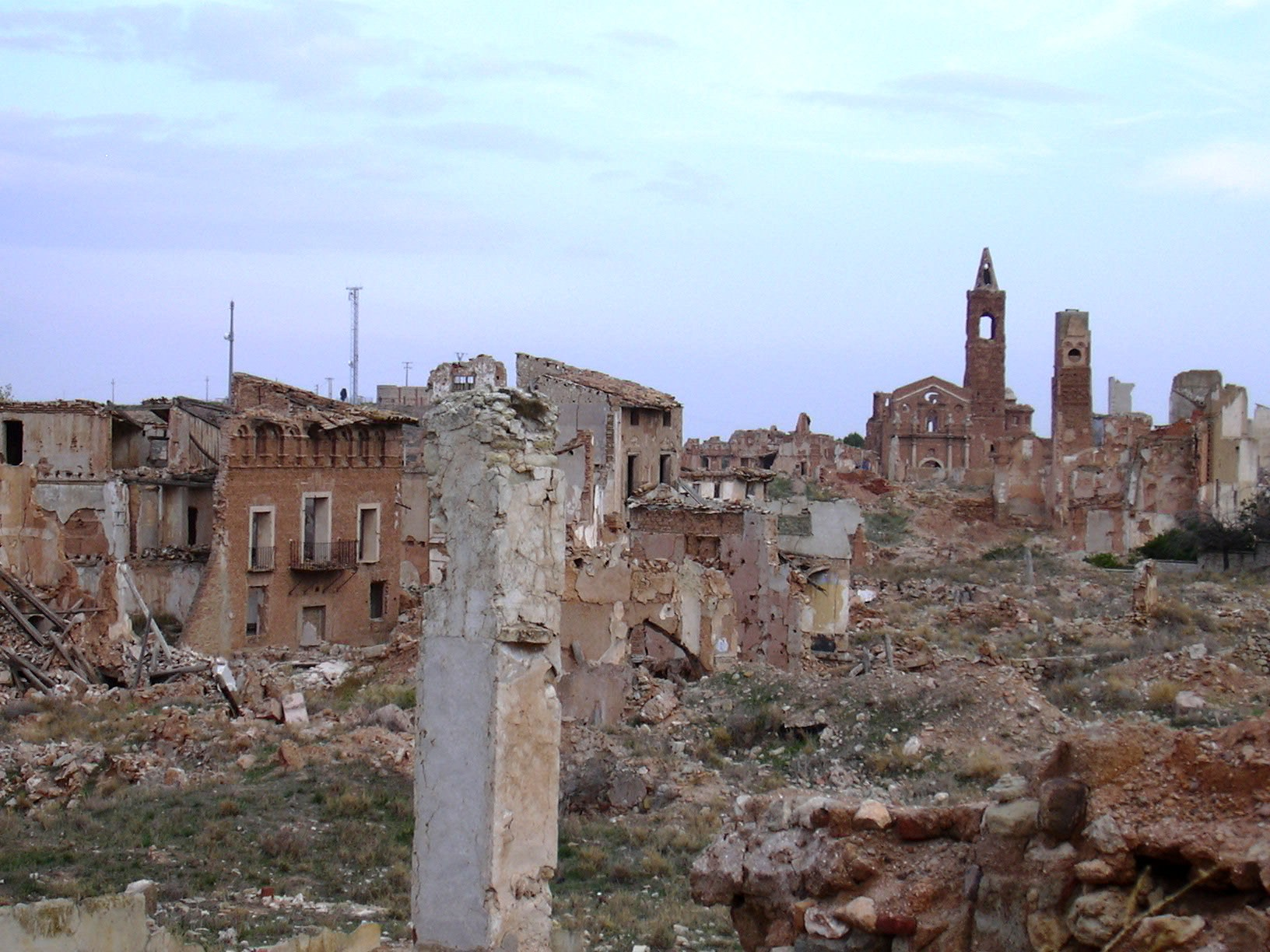
Belchite, Spain

- Belchite, in the province of Zaragoza, Aragon, is one of the best-known ghost towns in Spain. Before the 1930s, Belchite was a growing city, with many services. As a consequence of the Battle of Belchite, during the Spanish Civil War, the city was totally destroyed. Instead of a reconstruction, Franco decided to keep the ruins of the old town of Belchite intact as a memorial of the battle. As of 1964, the town was totally deserted, the inhabitants having been removed to Belchite Nuevo, on the side of the old town. The ruins, which are not accommodated for tourism, are visited by more than 10,000 tourists annually. It is also a well-known meeting point for Francoist nostalgics, especially Falangists.
- Granadilla, Extremadura
- Aldealcardo, Soria
- La Cornudilla, Valencia
- Erillcastell, near El Pont de Suert, Catalonia
- Esperan, near El Pont de Suert, Catalonia
- Jánovas, Fiscal
- Lacort, Fiscal
- La Estrella, Mosqueruela
- Llombai in the Vall de Gallinera, Alacant
- Ochate, Condado de Treviño, Burgos, Castille and Leon
- Peranera, near El Pont de Suert, Catalonia
- Pernui in Sort, Lleida, Catalonia
- Todoque in La Palma, Canary Islands. During the 2021 Cumbre Vieja volcanic eruption, the locality was severely affected. Hundreds of buildings, including the Church of Saint Pius X, the health center, the headquarters of the neighborhood association, the School of Early Childhood Education, Los Campitos Elementary School, the Todoque Elementary and the Infant Education School, and by 10 October, new lava flows destroyed the buildings that were still standing, leaving the town practically erased from the map.
- Viuet, near El Pont de Suert, Catalonia

=== Sweden ===
- Laver
- Såtenäs villa-city
- Messaure
- Harsprånget
- Tacketorp
- Old Grängesberg

=== Switzerland ===
- Brienz/Brinzauls, a village and former municipality in Grisons Canton which was evacuated, likely permanently, in 2024 over serious concerns for the potential for a catastrophic landslide.

=== Ukraine ===
After the Chernobyl nuclear disaster in 1986, hundreds of settlements within the exclusion zone were evacuated. Some have remained abandoned ever since, including:

- Andriivka
- Chernobyl
- Dibrova
- Kopachi
- Novoshepelychi
- Opachychi
- Poliske, Kyiv Oblast
- Poliske, Zhytomyr Oblast
- Pripyat
- Severivka
- Tarasy
- Velyki Klishchi
- Vilcha
- Yaniv

After the Russian invasion of Ukraine in 2022, many people fled and were evacuated from towns and cities throughout Ukraine, including:

- Marinka
- Bilohorivka
- Novotoshkivske
- Toshkivka
- Pisky
- Soledar
- Popasna

=== United Kingdom ===
Also see List of lost settlements in the United Kingdom

==== England ====
- Birchinlee in Derbyshire was a village built by the Derwent Valley Water Board for the workers (and their families) who constructed the Derwent and Howden Dams between 1902 and 1916.
- Derwent in Derbyshire was demolished in the 1940s to make way for the Ladybower Reservoir.
- Cuddington was a hamlet in Surrey that was demolished in the sixteenth century so that Nonsuch Palace (itself later demolished) could be built.
- Dunwich, a once-thriving town on the Suffolk coast, began to decline in 1286 when a storm swept much of it into the sea. Subsequent storms and coastal erosion have since claimed all but a few of the remaining buildings.
- Ewden Village in the Civil Parish of Stocksbridge was a timber-built village, completed in 1929 to house workers working on the Morehall and Broomhead reservoirs.
- Hallsands is a coastal village in Devon that was destroyed by a storm in 1917.
- Hambleton, in Rutland, is a civil parish that once included the settlements of Middle Hambleton and Nether Hambleton, which were both flooded in 1975 to create Rutland Water.
- Heathrow, a small village in Middlesex, was demolished in 1944 so that Heathrow Airport could be built.
- Mardale Green in the Lake District was demolished and flooded in 1935 to create Haweswater Reservoir.
- Martinsthorpe, in Rutland, is one of the few civil parishes in England to have a population of zero.
- Ravenser Odd is a village on the coast of the East Riding of Yorkshire, that was swept away in the Grote Mandrenke storm of 1362.
- Ravenspurn, also on the coast of the East Riding of Yorkshire, south of Ravenser Odd, and near Spurn Head, was abandoned in the 19th century and was swept into the North Sea.
- Samson is a remote island of the Isles of Scilly that has been deserted since 1855.
- Shipden, in Norfolk, was washed into the sea in the 14th century.
- Stanlow Island, in Merseyside found on the Manchester Ship Canal was abandoned in the 1990s due to hazards of living nearby a refinery.
- Tide Mills in East Sussex was condemned as unfit for habitation and abandoned in 1939.
- Wyck, a deserted medieval village in West Tisbury, abandoned in the 14th century.
- Wharram Percy is a medieval village in North Yorkshire abandoned in the early 16th century for more sheep pasture.

In 1942 and 1943, in preparation for the Allied assault on Normandy, several villages were evacuated to be used as training grounds for the British Army and U.S. forces. This was intended to be a temporary arrangement, but many of the villages remained abandoned, and are used for military training to this day. Some of these villages are listed below; most of them are located within the Stanford Battle Area in Norfolk.

- Buckenham Tofts, Norfolk
- Imber, Wiltshire
- Langford, Norfolk
- Stanford, Norfolk
- Sturston, Norfolk
- Tottington, Norfolk
- Tyneham, Dorset
- West Tofts, Norfolk

==== Scotland ====
- Boreraig, on the Isle of Skye, was one of many villages that were forcibly evacuated by Scottish aristocrats in the 18th and 19th centuries.
- Bothwellhaugh, in North Lanarkshire, is a former coal mining town that now lies under Strathclyde Loch.
- Hallaig, on the island of Raasay, depopulated as part of the Highland Clearances and subject of a famous Gaelic poem by Sorley MacLean.
- Mingulay, an island at the southern end of the Outer Hebrides, depopulated as part of the ongoing effects of the Highland Clearances, the village on the island finally abandoned in 1912.
- The Monach Islands, also known as Heisker, in the Outer Hebrides; the village abandoned in 1932 and depopulated in 1942 with the closure of the lighthouse.
- North Rona is a remote Scottish island that has been deserted since 1844.
- Scarp, whose last permanent inhabitants left for nearby Harris in 1971. Site of Gerhard Zucker's experiments with rocket mail.
- Saint Kilda is an archipelago in the Outer Hebrides that was abandoned in 1930, and is now a World Heritage Site.

==== Wales ====
- Capel Celyn in Gwynedd was flooded in 1965 to create the reservoir Llyn Celyn.
- Llangaffo in Anglesey, north of Dwyran, south of Gaerwen and northwest of Llanidan where the school had closed down and maintained its ghost town status until 2023.
- Nant Gwrtheyrn in Gwynedd is a former quarry town that became abandoned during World War II, but is now the site of a Welsh language learning centre.

== North America ==
=== Costa Rica ===
- Cinchona (Sarapiquí, Alajuela) was destroyed by the 2009 Costa Rica earthquake, which left 25 people dead and five missing.

=== Dominica ===
- Petite Savanne was destroyed when Tropical Storm Erika unleashed a series of deadly mudslides in 2015; the government ordered a mandatory and permanent evacuation of all residents.

=== Guatemala ===
- San Miguel Los Lotes was buried by a pyroclastic flow during the 2018 Volcán de Fuego eruption on 3 June 2018.

=== Mexico ===
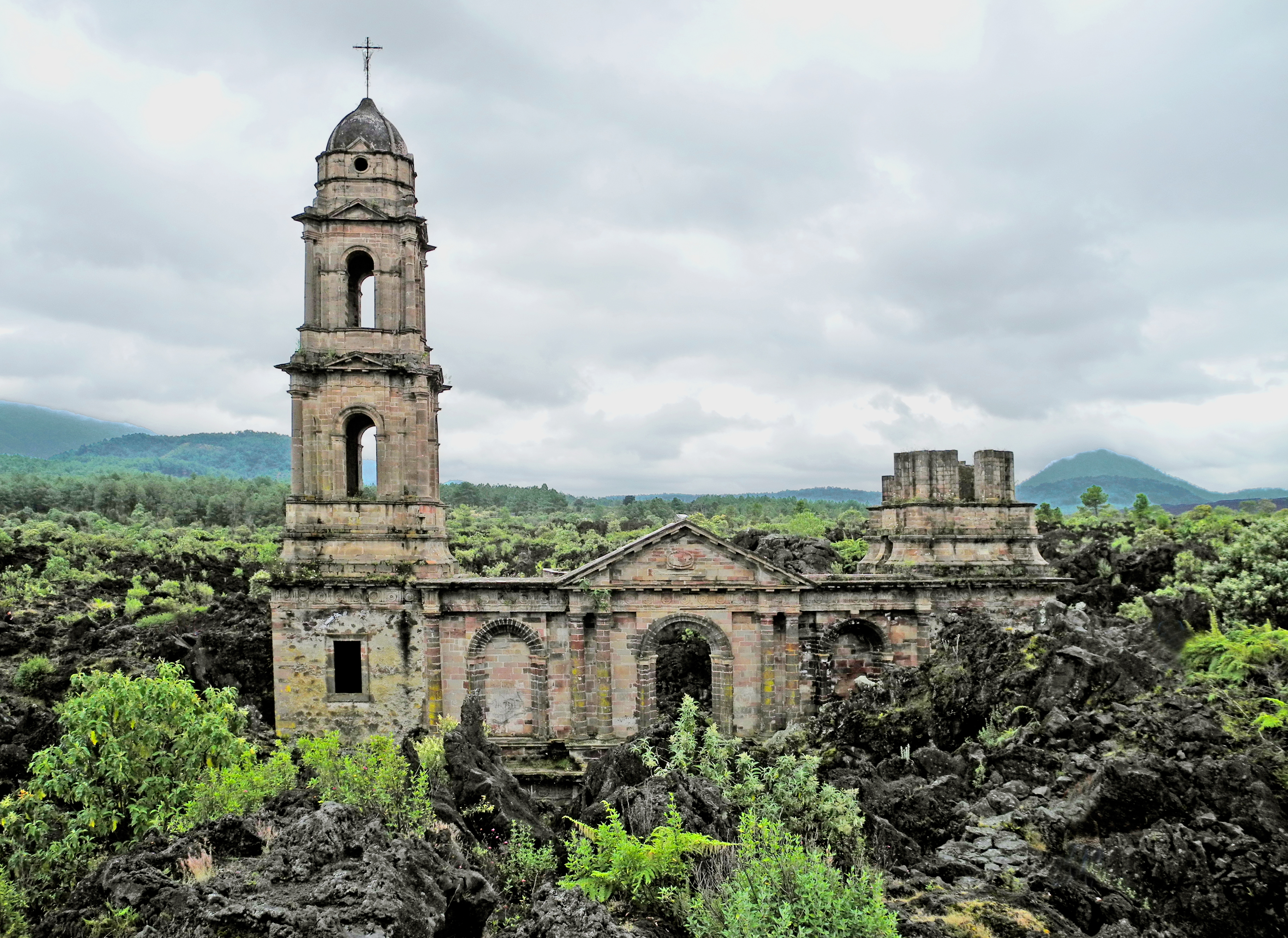
Church of San Juan Parangaricutiro

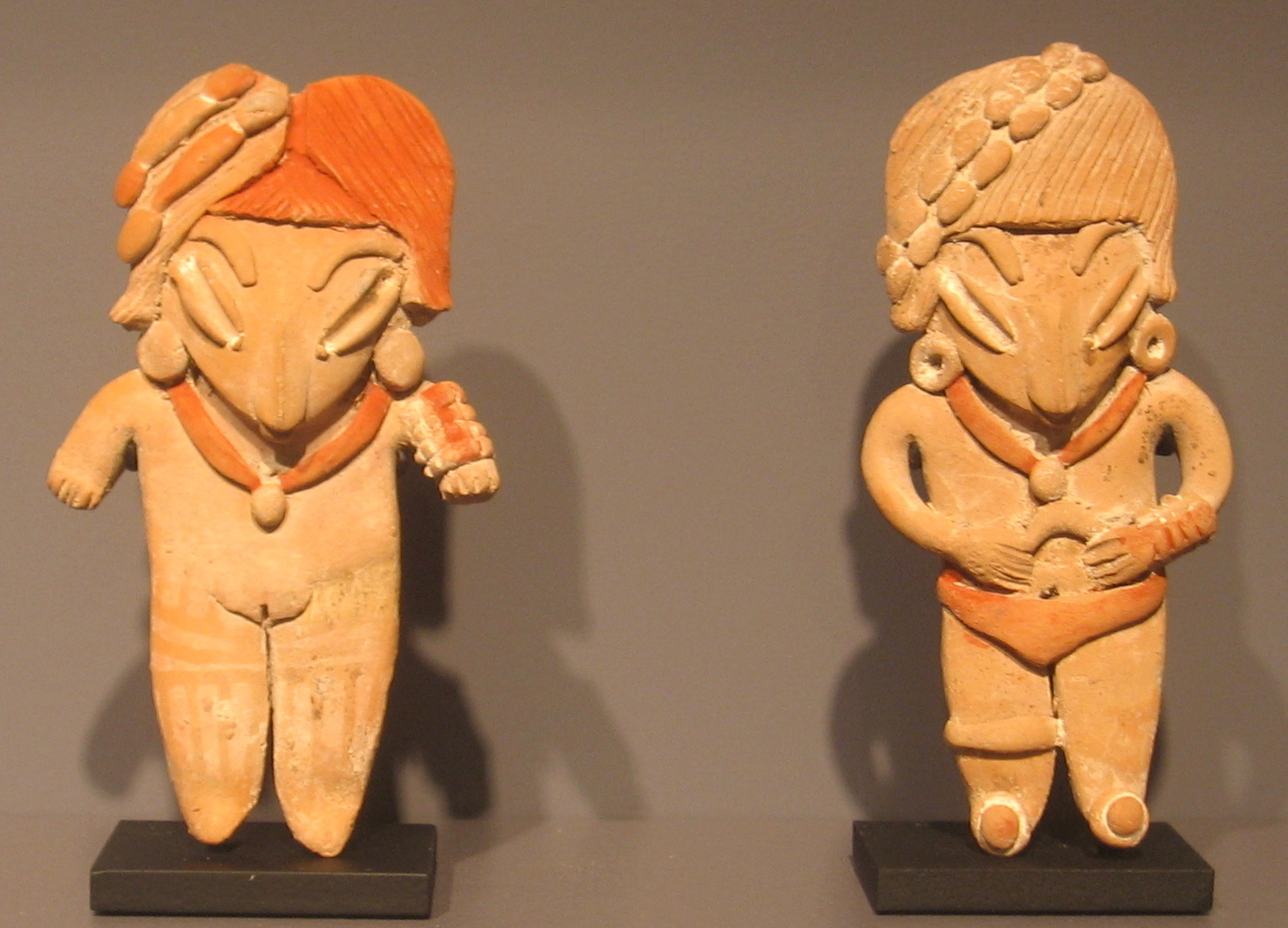
Figurines from the now flooded surroundings of Chupícuaro

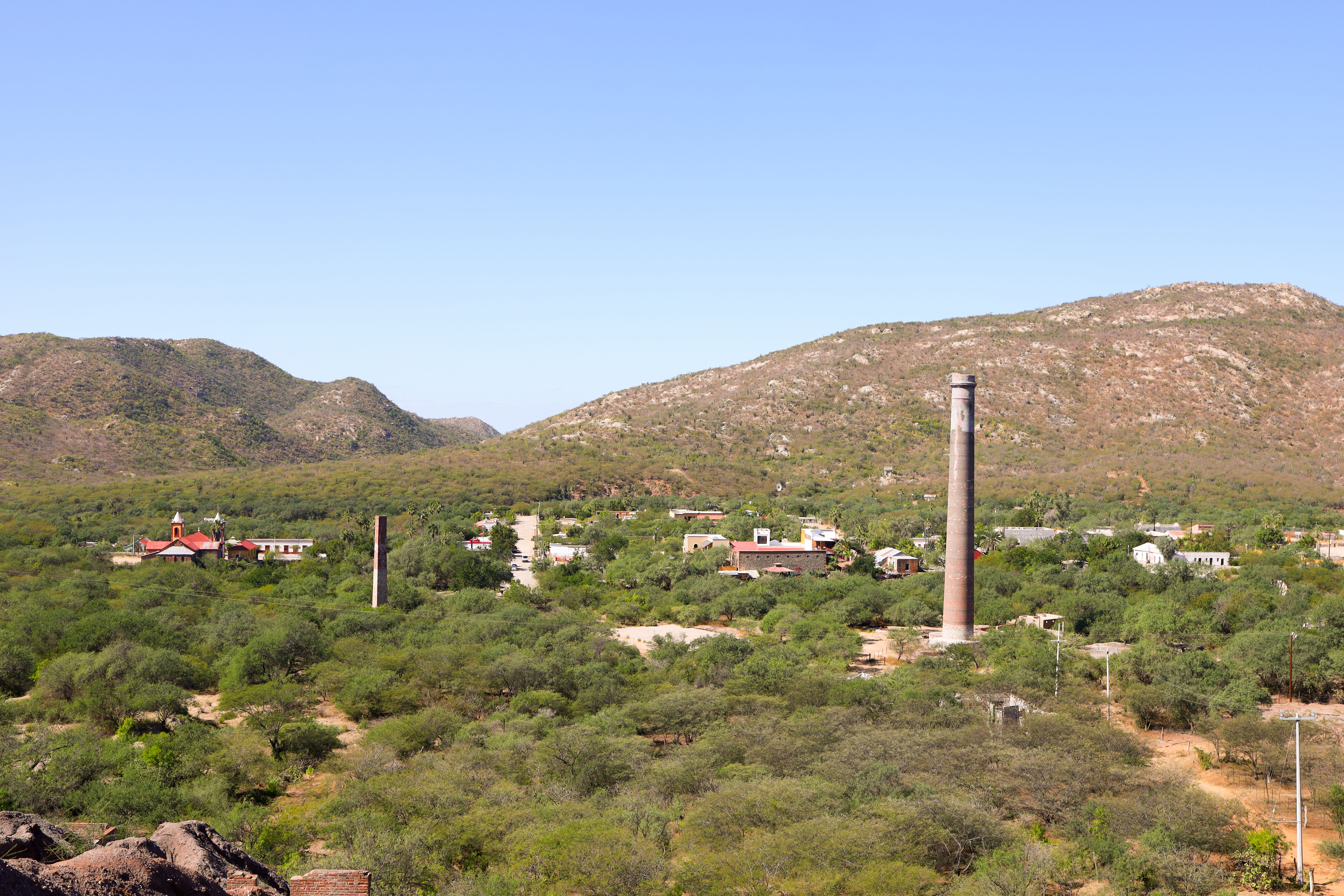
Townscape of El Triunfo

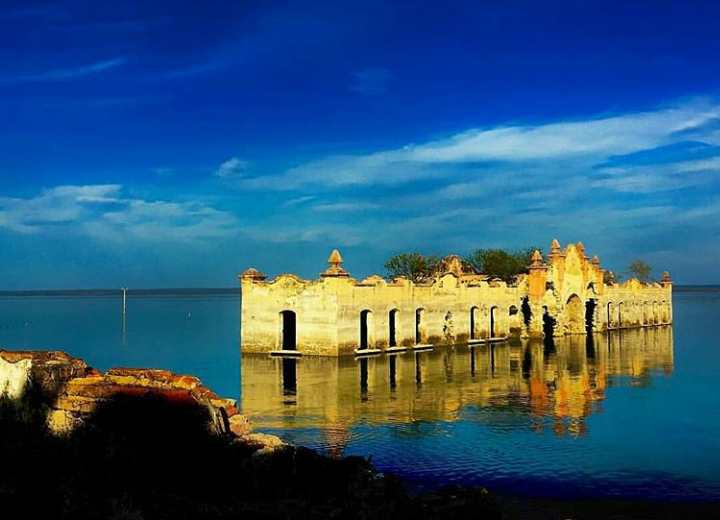
Old school of Padilla

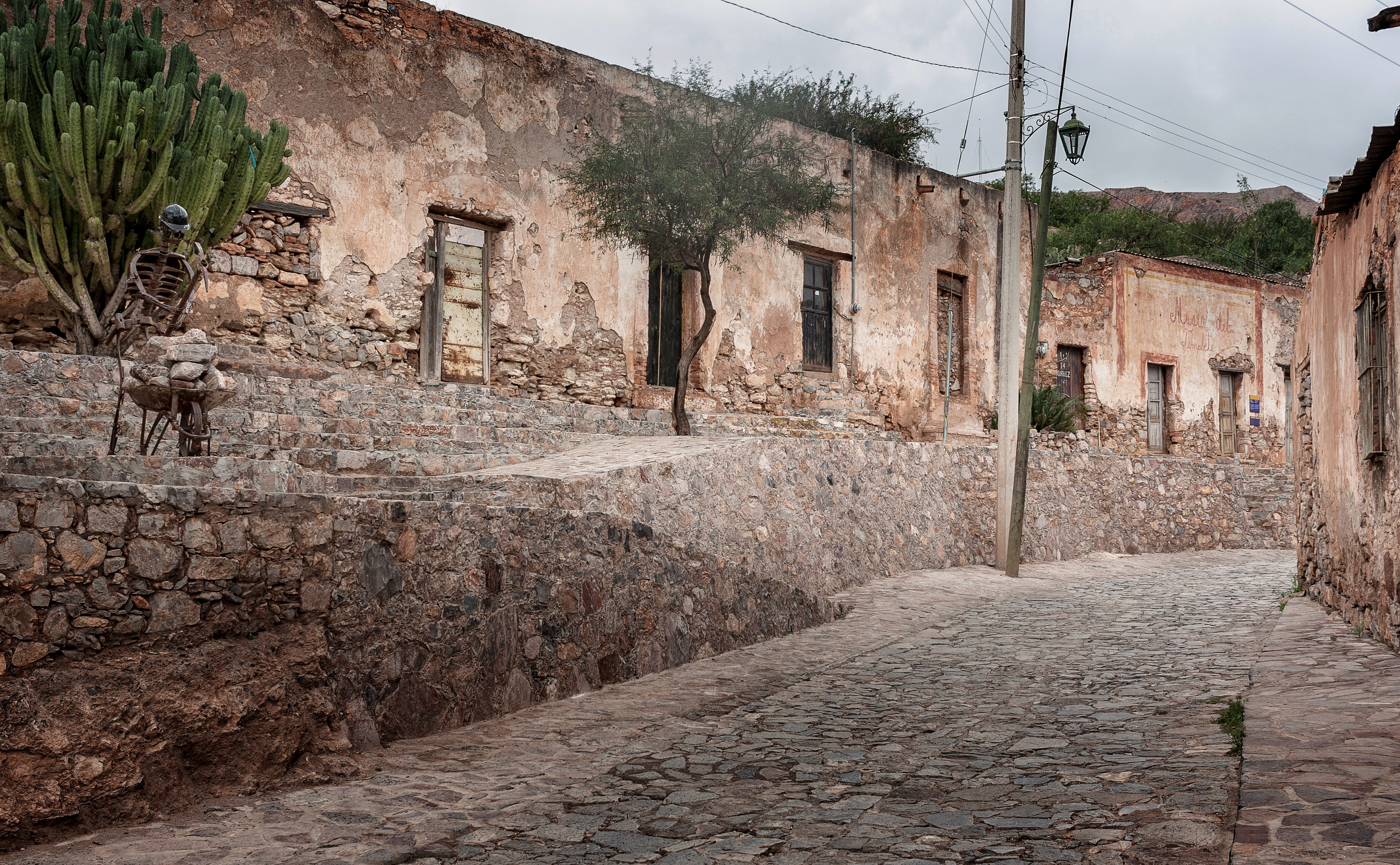
Street at Cerro de San Pedro

- San Juan Parangaricutiro is a village in Michoacán that was buried by ash and lava in 1943, during the formative eruption of Parícutin.
- Ojuela, a mining town near Durango City, was abandoned when the area's ore supply was exhausted.
- Real de Catorce was once a flourishing silver mining town in northern Mexico. Its dramatic landscapes and buildings have been used by Hollywood for movies such as The Mexican (2001) with Brad Pitt and Julia Roberts. Recent efforts to adapt the town to tourism have created a mixture of ghost town and heritage tourist site adapted to visitors in search of interesting history in the country.
- San Antonio de la Iguana, Nuevo León
- Thompson's Landing was a port at the mouth of the Colorado River. During the early settlement of Arizona, shallow-draft steamboats plied the lower reaches of the river.
- Jalapa del Marqués, Oaxaca was an important town under precolonial times and after the Spanish conquest. It was flooded in 1961 in order to make way for a dam. The town was relocated south. Only the former Dominican convent remains.
- Santo Tomás de los Plátanos, Mexico was a small town in the former frontier between the Purépecha Empire and the Aztec Empire, but was flooded in 1956 in order to make way for a dam. A solemn procession with the church's icons was made to the new location, uphill. Only the belltower of the church remains.
- Padilla, Tamaulipas was stablished in 1749 by José de Escandón, served as capital of Tamaulipas between 1824 and 1825, was the place where Agustín de Iturbide was executed and Manuel Mier y Terán took his life. However, the town was flooded in 1971 to make way to a dam, and was relocated upstream. Only ruins remain from the original town, among them the church, the school and the monument marking the place of Iturbide's execution.
- Ciudad Guerrero, Tamaulipas was stablished in 1749 by José de Escandón, served as capital of the Republic of the Rio Grande in 1840. It was abandoned in 1953 in order to make way for the Falcón Dam. When the waters recede, most of the town's stone houses and church are visitable and in decent conditions.
- Santiago Tlaltepoxco, Hidalgo. The town was cleared since the 19th century in order to make way to the railroad from Mexico to Paso del Norte. Only a very ruined church and an old bridge from the old royal road remains.
- Chupícuaro, Guanajuato was one of the oldest settlements in the northern limits of Mesoamerica, where several ancient objects have been found defined as of a particular culture, identified by its name. However, it was flooded in 1949 in order to make way for a dam, and its inhabitants relocated north to a new settlement called Nuevo Chupícuaro. Some intensive excavations were done to salvage as much prehispanic artifacts as possible before the flood took over. It's been almost always covered by water ever since, and the ruined remains of the church rarely surface. In 2013, after a prolongated drought that lowered the lake's levels, the municipality was able to recover the top piece of the belltower, which was installed in the atrium of the new town's church.
- San Luis Taxhimay, Mexico, also known as San Luis de las Peras, was a town in the municipality of Villa del Carbón. It was flooded in 1934 in order to make way for a dam. Only the belltower of the main church and the façade of a chapel remain.
- San Francisco Bojay, Hidalgo was a town in the municipality of Tula flooded in 1949 in order to make way for the Endhó dam. The suburbs were cut in two, becoming separate villages, while its church remained in the middle, often flooded but with its belltower still standing.
- San Antonio Corrales, Hidalgo was a town in the municipality of Alfajayucan flooded in 1950 in order to make way to a dam. The town was relocated to the south, while the small church complex, only remaining building in the original location, has an excellent conservation status.
- La Pupa, Nayarit was a mining town that rose around an old hacienda. With the mine's closure, the town was progressively abandoned. The ruins are still in relatively good condition.
- El Triunfo, Baja California Sur was stablished as a mining town in the late 18th century, was mostly abandoned in 1926 after the mines were shut. Not entirely deserted, it is however barely inhabited. Some buildings have since been restored in order to house touristic facilities.
- San Antonio, Baja California Sur was stablished as a mining town in the late 18th century, and became capital of the territory of Baja California in 1829, losing a while later that privilege to La Paz. It was mostly abandoned in 20th century after the mines were shut. Not entirely deserted, it is however barely inhabitted.
- Cerro de San Pedro, San Luis Potosí is a depopulated mining town. During the 20th century a sour work relationship between the mine operators and the workers closed the mine in 1948, causing its almost total depopulation. The mineral hasn't been drained, but the operation of an open pit mine started in 1998. The pit is directly behind the town. This and the disappearance of the namesake hill (Cerro de San Pedro means "St. Peter's Hill") has threatened the townsite, considered an area of colonial monuments.
- San Pedro de los Pozos, Guanajuato. Not completely abandoned yet and with a second life oriented to tourism, it was a mining town that was abandoned when the mines flooded.
- Bolaños, Jalisco. Former important mining town, it has been reduced to being barely more than a village with less than 1000 inhabitants. Its ruins (the main church, the mint, palaces, etc.) still persist as the reminder of a time past.
- La Encarnación, Hidalgo.
- El Rosario, Baja California Sur.
- Misnébalam, Yucatán

=== Montserrat ===
- Amersham in the Saint Anthony Parish was abandoned in the wake of the Soufrière Hills eruption in 1997.
- Plymouth was once the seat of government in Montserrat, and home to around 4,000 people, until it was almost completely destroyed by the Soufrière Hills volcano in 1997. The entire southern half of the island is now off-limits, leaving over 30 villages and towns abandoned.

=== Saint Pierre and Miquelon ===
- L'Île-aux-Marins ("Sailor's Island") is a ghost town/island located a few miles away from the island of Saint-Pierre. Once inhabited by over 600 fishermen, families and tradesmen, the island was progressively abandoned until the last inhabitant left in 1965. The island is now a tourist attraction.

== Oceania ==
=== Australia ===
- Old Adaminaby drowned by new lake of Snowy Mountains Hydro-Electric scheme. Town relocated.
- Ballara is an abandoned copper mining town in Queensland.
- Betoota, in Queensland, is the smallest designated town in Australia; its last permanent resident died in 2004.
- Big Bell is a former mining town in Western Australia.
- Boydtown, in New South Wales, was originally settled and then abandoned in the 1840s. It remained abandoned until the 1930s. It is now a growing town with commercial and residential developments.
- Broad Arrow was a gold rush town in Western Australia that had been abandoned by the 1920s.
- Calcifer was a mining town established on the Atherton Tablelands in 1894, abandoned by 1907.
- Cassilis was a gold rush town in Victoria that declined during the First World War.
- Collingwood in Queensland was established in 1878, but abandoned about 1900 when it was outcompeted as a regional centre by nearby Winton. There is a commemorative marker at the old graveyard listing eight persons known to be buried there.
- Cook is an isolated town in South Australia built around a railway station, which was closed down in 1997.
- Copperfield is a former copper mining town in Queensland.
- Cossack in Western Australia was a flourishing port town in the 1800s, and profited greatly from the pearling industry. It began to decline during the 20th century.
- Crotty in Western Tasmania was abandoned when the nearby mine closed down. It is now submerged beneath Lake Burbury.
- Cudgegong was a small town in central western New South Wales. Windamere dam now exists where the town once stood, but ruins can be seen in times of drought when the dam dries up.
- Denison Town in New South Wales.
- Farina in South Australia was abandoned when its settlers found that the climate was unsuitable for arable farming.
- Glen Davis in New South Wales was the centre of an oil shale industry during the Second World War; the mine was closed down in 1952.
- Goldsworthy is a former iron ore mining town in Western Australia.
- Gwalia in Western Australia was abandoned when its gold mine closed down in 1963.
- Hill End in New South Wales was never fully abandoned and is now a popular tourist town.
- Iron Baron is a former mining town in South Australia.
- Jay Creek in the Northern Territory was a government settlement for Indigenous Australians in the 1920s and 30s.
- Joadja is a former mining town in New South Wales that had become abandoned by 1911.
- Kanowna is a town in Western Australia that flourished during a gold rush in the late 19th century, and declined during the Great Depression.
- Kiandra is a former gold mining town in New South Wales.
- Linda is a former mining town in Tasmania.
- Malcolm is a former gold mining town in Western Australia.
- Mary Kathleen is a former mining town in Queensland that was deserted after the mine closed down in 1982.
- Maytown is a former mining town in the Palmer River goldfields of Queensland.
- Moliagul is a former gold mining town in Victoria; it was here that the world's largest gold nugget, known as the "Welcome Stranger", was discovered in 1869.
- Mount Britton is a former gold mining town in Queensland.
- Mount Cuthbert is a former copper mining town in Queensland.
- Mount Mulligan is a former coal mining town in Queensland that closed down in 1957.
- Nannine is a former gold mining town in Western Australia.
- Newnes is a former oil shale mining site in New South Wales.
- Old Tallangatta, in Victoria, was abandoned when most of the township was moved 8 km (5 miles) west due to the enlargement of Lake Hume. The current township of Tallangatta has approximately 1,000 residents.
- Ophir is a former gold mining town in New South Wales.
- Ora Banda is a former gold mining town in Western Australia.
- Paradise is a former gold mining town in Queensland.
- Whilst not a town, Parramatta Road in Sydney has over 100 abandoned and boarded-up stores on its 23-kilometre-long (14 mi) strip. The most affected suburbs on the road are Concord and Leichhardt, which would feature empty and derelict shops here and there.
- Pillinger was a port town established in Tasmania to ship ore from the nearby mines.
- Ravenswood in north-eastern Queensland was a ghost town for many years, due to the declining gold rushes, but new gold discoveries in the area and improved mineral processing technologies have boosted the economy of the area and revived the town.
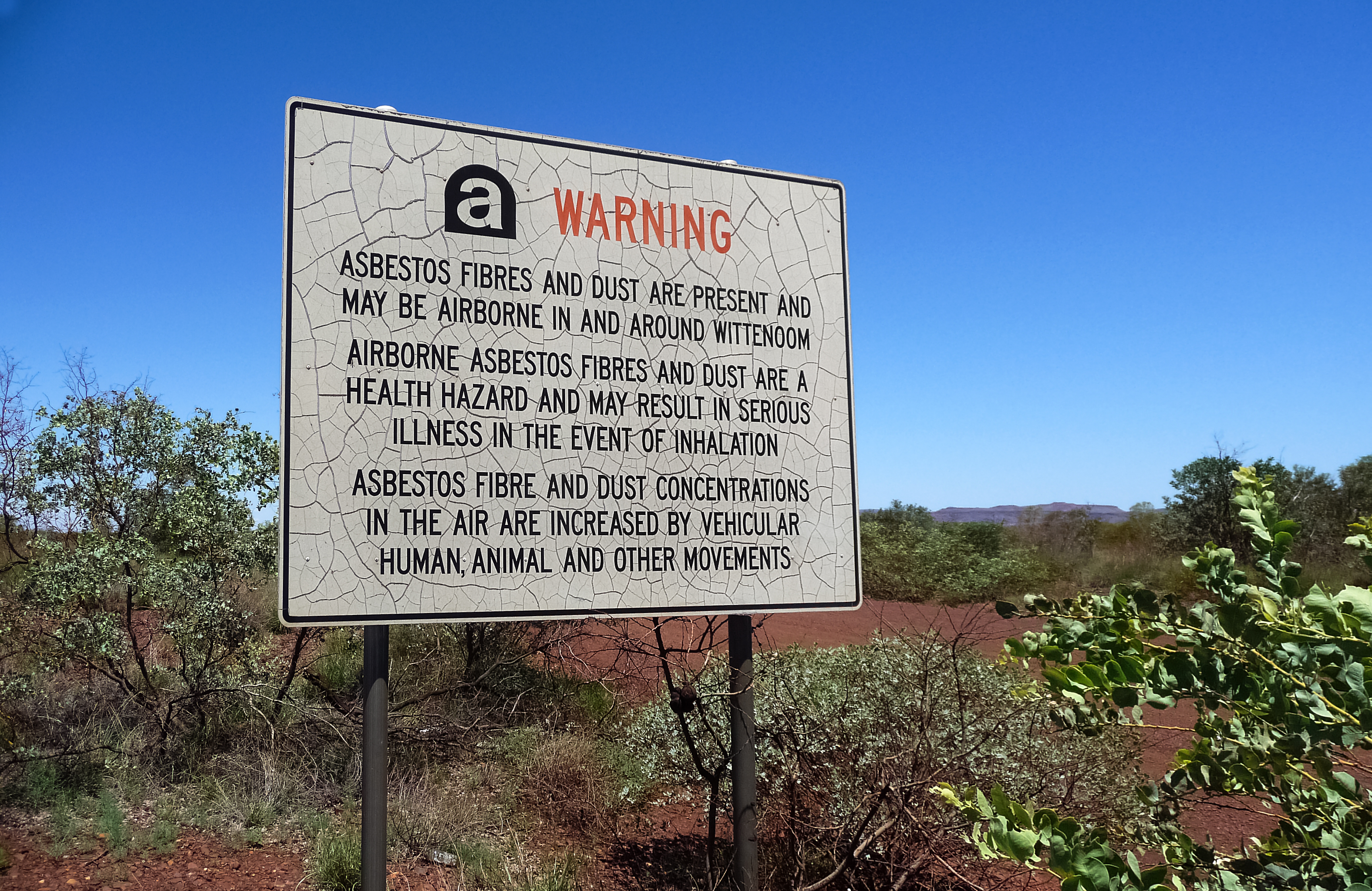
  Sign outside Wittenoom, in Australia, which warns of lingering asbestos danger in the town.
- Selwyn in the Shire of Cloncurry, Queensland, is a former copper mining town.
- Shay Gap in Western Australia's Pilbara region was a company town that existed for roughly 20 years until the iron ore mining ceased in 1993.
- Silverton is a former silver mining town in New South Wales that was deserted when more lucrative silver-lead-zinc ore was discovered at nearby Broken Hill.
- Tarcoon, New South Wales
- Walhalla, Victoria, was never fully abandoned and has now become a popular tourist town.
- Western Tyers, a timber community in Victoria, was abandoned after the timber mill closed in 1969.
- Whroo, a former mining town in Victoria.
- Wittenoom in Western Australia was the country's only source of blue asbestos (crocidolite) in the 1950s and 60s. The mine was shut down in 1966, and the residents of the town were gradually relocated, due to concerns that the asbestos in the air posed a danger to their health.
- Yerranderie is a former silver mine in New South Wales.

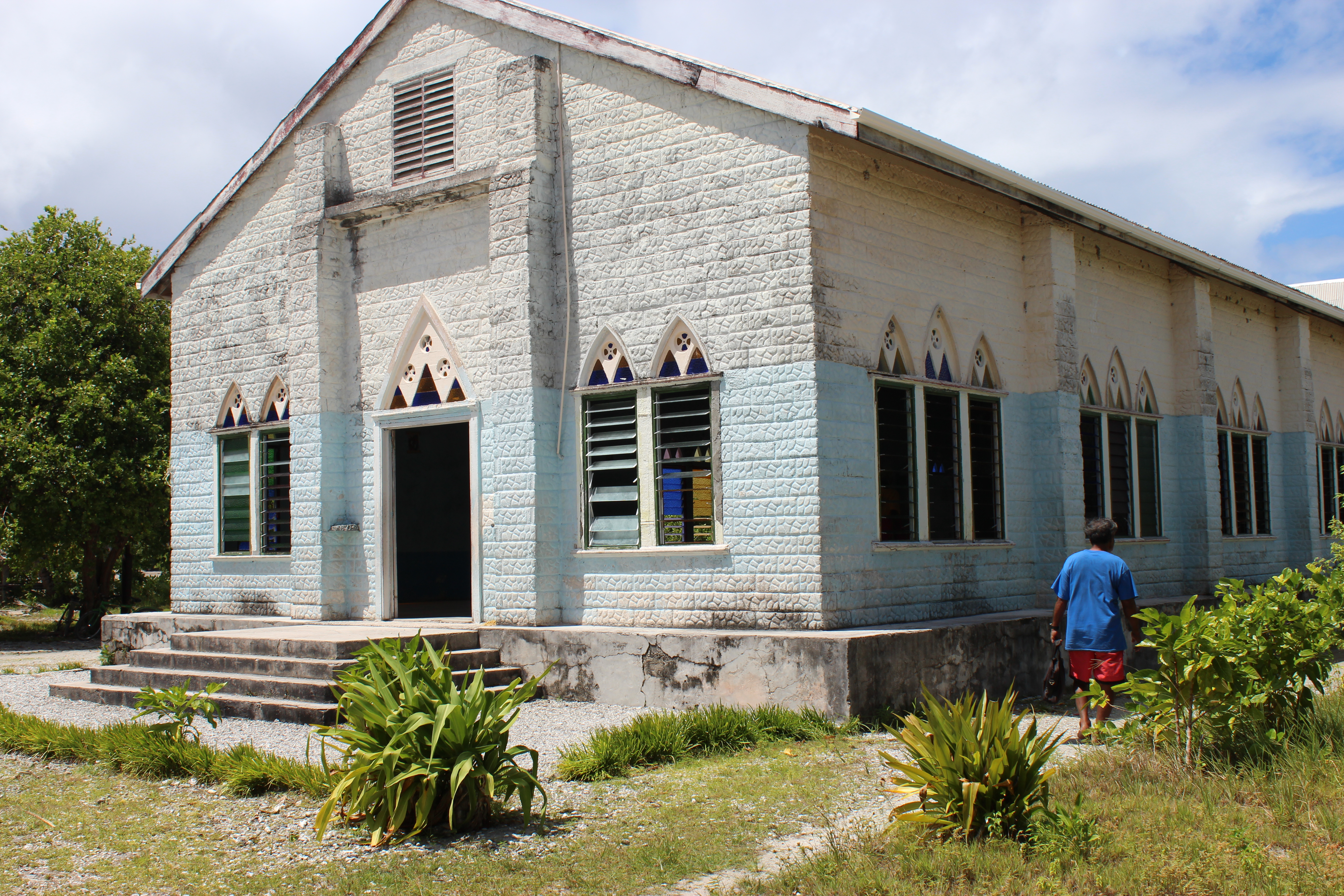
A building in Tebunginako, in Kiribati, shows cracks in the foundation caused by saltwater exposure as the area floods at high tide

=== Kiribati ===
- Banaba, which once had a phosphate mining town.
- Paris
- Tebunginako, where most of the town has been flooded by rising sea levels.

=== New Zealand ===
- Denniston was a coal mining town in the West Coast Region of the South Island of New Zealand. Formerly with a population of around 1400, it now has about ten residents.
- Hardwicke was the sole European settlement in the Auckland Islands, founded in 1849 but abandoned in 1851.
- Jamestown was a settlement in what is now Fiordland National Park.
- Kelso was abandoned after severe and repeated flooding in the late 1970s and early 1980s.
- Lyell was a gold mining town in the Buller Gorge in the South Island.
- Macetown was a gold rush town in Central Otago that started to decline during the 20th century.
- Nenthorn was an Otago gold mining town from 1888 until the 1890s, abandoned when its mining efforts collapsed. Only two ruined buildings and the remains of a battery remain.
- Port Craig is a former logging township on the southwest coast of the South Island.
- Port Molyneux was a port at the mouth of the Clutha River in Otago. After a flood caused the river mouth to move, the town was abandoned.
- Port Pegasus was a township on the south coast of Stewart Island in southern New Zealand.
- Rotowaro, a coal mining town, was removed in the 1980s to make way for an opencast mine. It is the site of the now abandoned Rotowaro Carbonisation Plant.
- Te Hutewai was a very small farming community located around 10 km south of Raglan, in the Waikato District. A school was built but was burnt down in the 1960s and the area today is now farmland.
- Te Wairoa, also called "The Buried Village", was a small Māori village that was destroyed by the 1886 eruption of Mount Tarawera.
- Venture, a small beech bark processing settlement in the Awaroa Inlet of the Abel Tasman National Park, was abandoned as the value of the bark declined and the cost of transport increased into the remote area. The remains of the foundations of the school house and assorted buildings remain in the bush today, although fire, time and the encroachment of the bush has rendered the ruins little more than a collection of stones and bricks. The settlement can only be reached by walking up a rarely used and poorly maintained track at low tide. The settlement and track are on the estate administered by the Department of Conservation.
- Waiuta was a gold mining town in the West Coast Region of the South Island of New Zealand until 1951.

== South America ==
=== Argentina ===
- The small lakeside resort town of Villa Epecuén was abandoned on 10 November 1985, after a series of heavy rains caused the lake water levels to rise and flood the town. The remains of the town re-emerged on 11 May 2013, when the waters of the lake receded.

=== Brazil ===
- The small village of Caraíbas, in the municipality of Itacarambi, suffered a rare earthquake in the early morning of 9 December 2007. It measured 4.9 on the Richter scale. Located over a geological fault, the village of 76 families was evacuated and has been abandoned ever since.
- Fordlândia was established by American industrialist Henry Ford in 1928 near Santarém. This was done to mass-produce natural rubber. Built in inadequate terrain, designed with no knowledge of tropical agriculture, and managed with little regard for local culture, the enterprise was an absolute failure; in 1934, the Ford factory was relocated to Belterra, but ultimately closed down in 1945.
- Velho Airão (formerly Airão) was founded in 1694 in the modern state of Amazonas. It gained relevance as a collection and distribution point for natural rubber in the Negro, Jaú and Branco Rivers but went bankrupt in the early 20th century, when the United Kingdom started purchasing rubber from British Malaya. This resulted in its inhabitants abandoning the town, most relocating to Itapeaçu, which was renamed to Novo Airão. After the last resident left in 1985, the site was utilized by the Brazilian Navy for firing practice until it was declared a protected historical landmark by the IPHAN in 2005.

=== Chile ===
- Chaitén is a small city in southern Chile that was heavily damaged by a volcanic eruption.
- Humberstone and Santa Laura Saltpeter Works are two former saltpeter refineries that have been declared a UNESCO World Heritage Site.
- La Noria, a deserted mining town in the Atacama Desert. The infamous Atacama skeleton was found at La Noria.
- Port Famine (Spanish: Puerto Hambre) is possibly Chile's oldest ghost town. It was founded in the Strait of Magellan in 1584 by Pedro Sarmiento de Gamboa. Starvation and the cold climate killed all of the inhabitants. The English navigator Sir Thomas Cavendish landed at the site in 1587. He found only ruins of the settlement, and renamed the place "Port Famine".
- Sewell is a former mining town that was once home to at least 14,000 people.

=== Colombia ===
- Armero was left in ruins by a volcanic eruption in 1985 that killed over 20,000 inhabitants. Survivors of the tragedy left for other towns, and Armero is currently unpopulated.
- Bojayá is a small town in the Chocó department, that was attacked by the Revolutionary Armed Forces of Colombia (FARC) on 2 May 2002. Most of the inhabitants hid in the church; A FARC mortar bomb landed in the building, killing approximately 140 people, including 40 children. Today, Bojayá is a ghost town and though plans have been made to rebuild it, it will not be on the exact location of the massacre.
- Gramalote, a town in Norte de Santander Department, was abandoned due to massive mudslides brought by flooding near the area.
- San Cayetano was permanently evacuated in 1999 as a result of a geological fault. Rebuilt in 2002 in a new location.
- Sativanorte was abandoned in 1933 after the land sinking. The population was rebuilt in a new location the following year.
- Siberia (Colombia), a town in Cundinamarca, was abandoned in 1998.
- Guasabra district of Santa Fe de Antioquia had to be abandoned due to geological instability, it was later rebuilt near its original location.
- San José de Maipures was a small town in the department of Vichada, it was the first capital of the department.
- Santa María la Antigua del Darién, initially founded by Spanish conquistadors, but was abandoned later.

=== French Guiana ===
- Guisanbourg was the former administrative centre of what is now Régina. The discovery of gold in 1855, led to its demise, and in the mid-1980s, the last citizen left the town.

=== Guyana ===
- Ituni, a former bauxite mining town in decline since the mines closed.
- Jonestown was established in the 1970s by members of the Peoples Temple, led by Jim Jones. On 18 November 1978, Jones orchestrated a mass suicide, resulting in the death of 913 of Jonestown's 1,110 inhabitants. The town now stands in ruins, and is being slowly reclaimed by the jungle.
- Mango Landing, a periodically waning gold mining town in the contested Essequibo region.

=== Peru ===
- Machu Picchu was built during the Inca Empire and is now a popular tourist site.

=== Venezuela ===
- Carmen de Uria, destroyed in 1999 during the Vargas flooding.
- Congo Mirador, a "floating village" suspended on Lake Maracaibo.
- La Cristinas, a gold mining town.
- Potosí was a Venezuelan town in the western state of Táchira. The town was deliberately flooded by the Venezuelan government in 1985 to build a hydroelectric dam. In 2010, the town was uncovered for the first time since its flooding due to a drought caused by the weather phenomenon called El Niño.

== See also ==
- Deadwood, South Dakota – an example of a historic town that almost became a ghost town in the 1960s, but revived as a tourist attraction.
- Category:Ghost towns
- Ghost town
