= Vranduk =

Vranduk may refer to the following places in Bosnia and Herzegovina:

- Vranduk (Doboj)
- Vranduk (Zenica)
