= Dragostin =

Dragostin Драгостин
- Former Village
- Location within Bulgaria
- Coordinates: 41°34′28″N 23°41′48″E
- Country: Bulgaria
- Province: Blagoevgrad Province
- Municipality: Gotse Delchev
- Time zone: UTC+2 (EET)
  - Summer (DST): UTC+3 (EEST)

Dragostin (before 1934 called Borzhoza) is a ruined mountain village now in the municipality of Gotse Delchev, in Blagoevgrad Province, Bulgaria.

According to the statistics of Bulgarian ethnographer Vasil Kanchov from 1900 the settlement is recorded as "Bordjova Çiftlik" with 70 inhabitants, all Bulgarian Christians. Served by a poor road, and surrounded by woodland, the village had fewer than twenty houses and stood about three kilometres to the west of the centre of Gotse Delchev. The population slowly left because there were no modern amenities and because access to the neighbouring town was difficult. Due to having no permanent residents, nor any other activity for many years, and after a plea from the Municipality, on 29 February 2008 Dragostin was removed from the official list of villages and the whole of its area was transferred into the administration of Gotse Delchev. The electric supply was cut off some years ago.

Although some of the former village's houses are still standing, they are not lived in, so are in decay, and some are thought to be in a dangerous state. However, a church standing just outside the village is reported to be still in good condition.
