= Eureka City =

Ghost town in South Africa

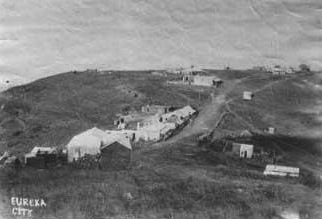
Eureka City

Eureka City is a ghost town in South Africa. It was established in 1885, when gold was discovered on the Sheba Reef. It is located 7 km from Barberton, Mpumalanga. Its ruins are now located in the northern section of Mountainlands Nature Reserve. A permit from the authorities is now required to enter the ghost town.

== History ==
In 1887 it had a population of around 700 people. In 1886, the town had three shops, three hotels, a bakery, chemist, racecourse, music hall and bars to cater for the diggers in the area. All that remains now are the ruins of the old Victoria Hotel and the neighbouring Sheba school. The town fell under the Lydenburg District of the South African Republic (ZAR).
