= Sredna =

Sredna Средна
- Former village
- Location within Bulgaria
- Coordinates: 41°35′N 23°41′E
- Country: Bulgaria
- Province: Blagoevgrad Province
- Municipality: Gotse Delchev
- Elevation: 670 m (2,200 ft)
- Time zone: UTC+2 (EET)
  - Summer (DST): UTC+3 (EEST)

Sredna is a former village in Gotse Delchev Municipality, in Blagoevgrad Province, Bulgaria. Because the village has had no permanent residents nor any activity for many years, after a plea from the municipality, it was erased from registers and all its land and other properties were transferred to the town of Gotse Delchev on February 29, 2008. Many of the houses are in bad condition.
