= Vranduk (Doboj) =

Vranduk Врандук
- Village
- Location within Bosnia and Herzegovina
- Coordinates: 44°51′43″N 18°01′50″E
- Country: Bosnia and Herzegovina
- Entity: Republika Srpska
- Municipality: Doboj

Population (2013)
  - Total: 3
- Time zone: UTC+1 (CET)
  - Summer (DST): UTC+2 (CEST)

Vranduk (Cyrillic: Врандук) is a village in the municipality of Doboj, Republika Srpska, Bosnia and Herzegovina. According to the preliminary results of the Bosnian census of 2013, while there are still 5 dwellings, it apparently no longer has any inhabitants. In 1991 it had a population of 199 of which 195 were Croats. The Yugoslavian censuses of 1971 and 1981 counted 167 and 224 inhabitants respectively.

== Historical Population ==
Historical population

Year	Pop.	±%
1971	167	—
1981	224	+34.1%

Year	Pop.	±%
1991	199	−11.2%
2013	3	−98.5%
