= Połonina Caryńska =

Polonyna in the Bieszczady mountains

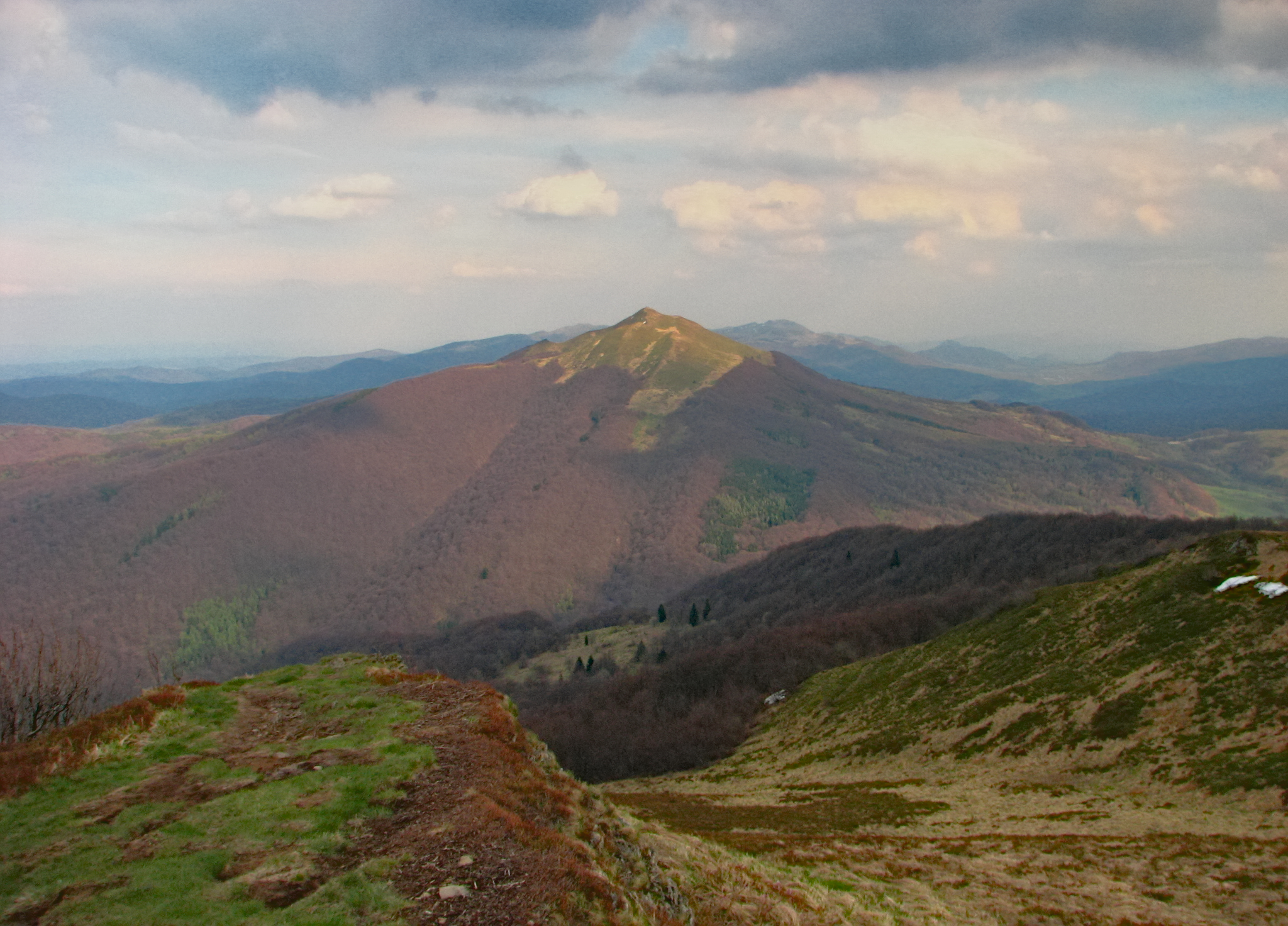
- View from Połonina Wetlińska

Highest point
- Peak: 1297 m, Kruhly Wierch
- Prominence: 442 m
- Coordinates: 49.1390°N 22.5801°E

Geography

Climbing
- Easiest route: Hiking

Połonina Caryńska, (Polish pronunciation: [pɔwɔˈnina t͡sarɨŋˈska]) also known as Połonina Berehowska, is a montane ecosystem in the Bieszczady Mountains laying between valleys of the Dwernik and Wołosaty rivers, which contain the settlements of Brzegi Górne and Ustrzyki Górne. It has four major culminations, the highest is Kruhly Wierch (1297 m), while the other ones have the heights of 1245, 1239 and 1148 metres.

Similar to Połonina Wetlińska, the southwestern slopes are sharp and short, while the southeastern ones are softer, filled with streams that form small valleys and are usually the preferred route. The Caryńskie Pass separates it from Magura Stuposiańska in the south, while the Wyżniańska Pass marks the border between it and the mountain chain Dział. The view from the peak is extensive, as the massifs of Wielka Rawka and Połonina Wetlińska as well as the biggest mountains of the region (Tarnica, Halicz) can be seen. During clear weather, the Ukrainian mountain range of Gorgany or even the Tatra Mountains can be seen.

== History ==
Its name derives from the village of Caryńskie, which is located near the połonina. It used to own a church and a cemetery in those lands, but they were moved and rebuilt in 1929. There are other villages which owned pastures on the land, such as Berehy Górne, Bereżki and Ustrzyki Górne. Grazing was still being carried out by those villages until the end of the interwar period, and due to large numbers of animals, the development of trees was limited and shaped the mountain's look to how it is today. Currently, it is in the Bieszczady National Park.

Połonina Caryńska contains many rare species such as Orobanche alba, Tozzia alpina, Carex bigelowii, Aconitum lasiocarpum and Aconitum bucovinense.

== Hiking trails ==
Brzegi Górne – Połonina Caryńska – Ustrzyki Górne (3:20h, 8.9 km)

Przysłup Caryński – Połonina Caryńska – Wyżniańska Pass – Mała Rawka (4h)

Ustrzyki Górne – Połonina Caryńska – Brzegi Górne – Wyżniańska Pass – Połonina Caryńska

== Gallery ==
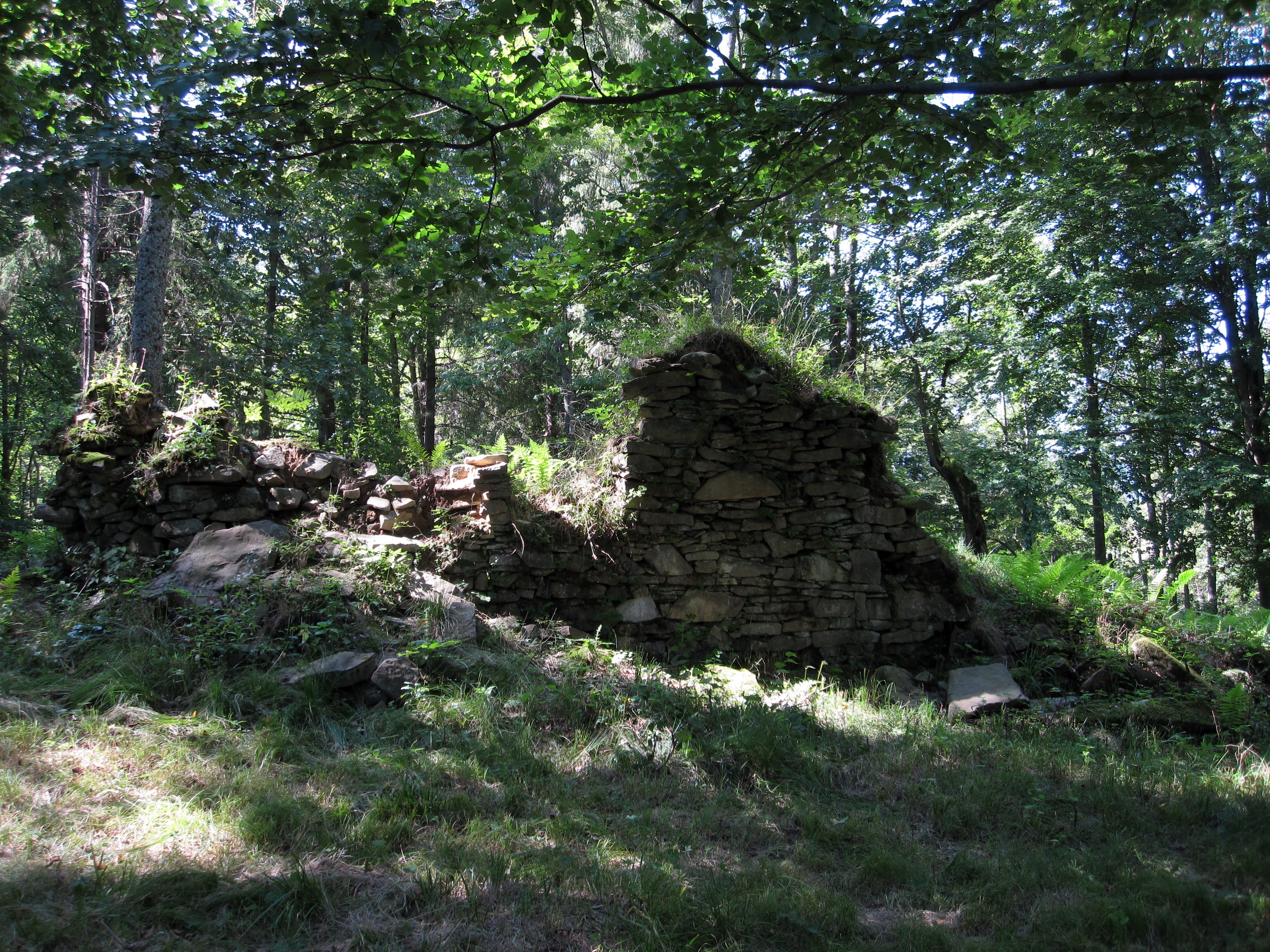
Church ruins

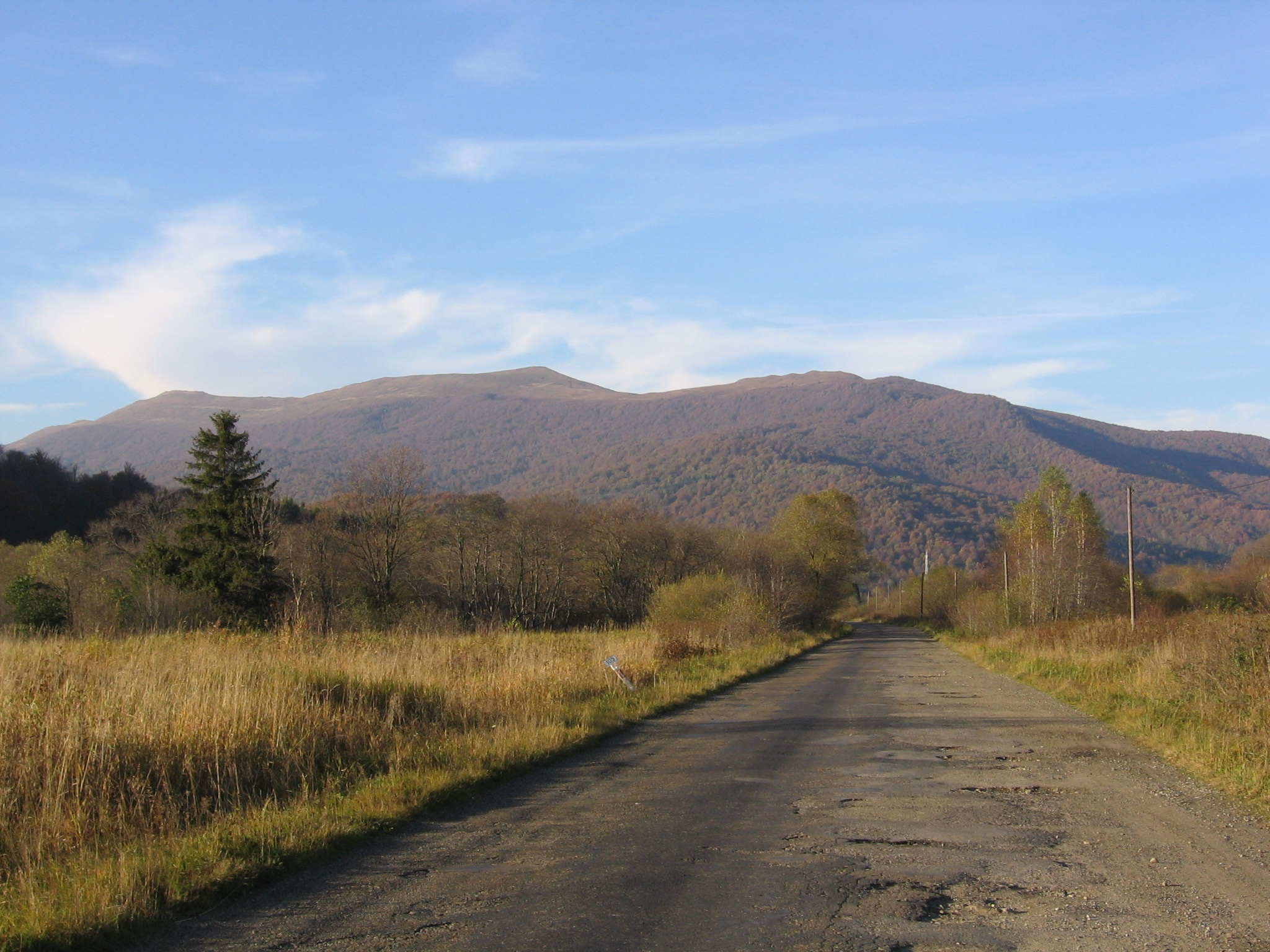
View from Wołosaty

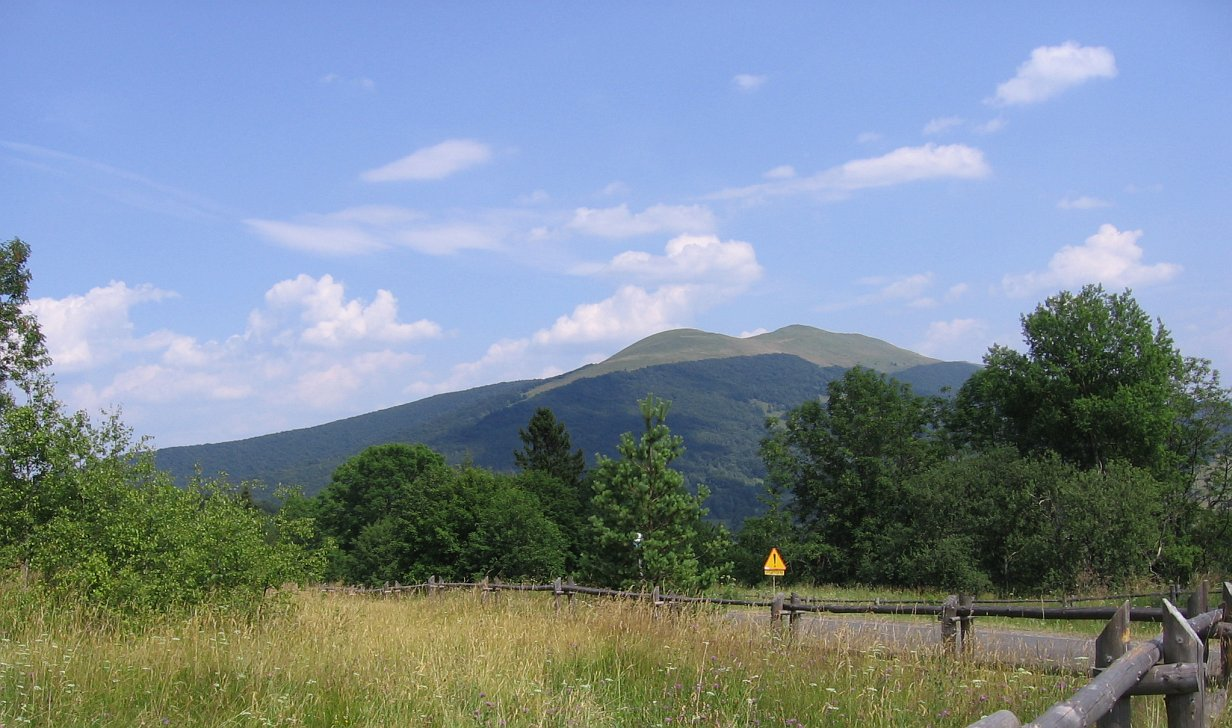
View from Wyżna Pass

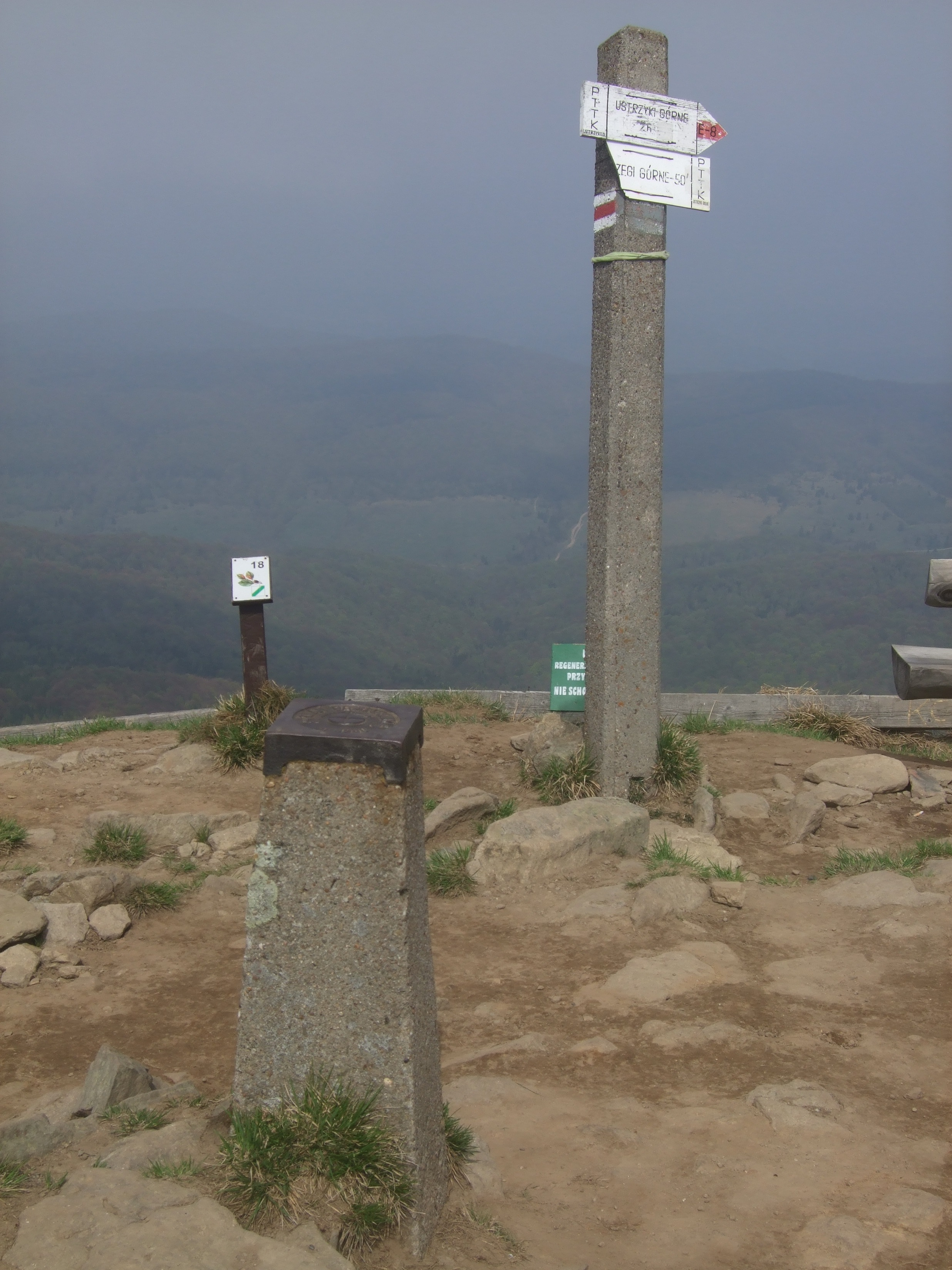
Geodetic control network point

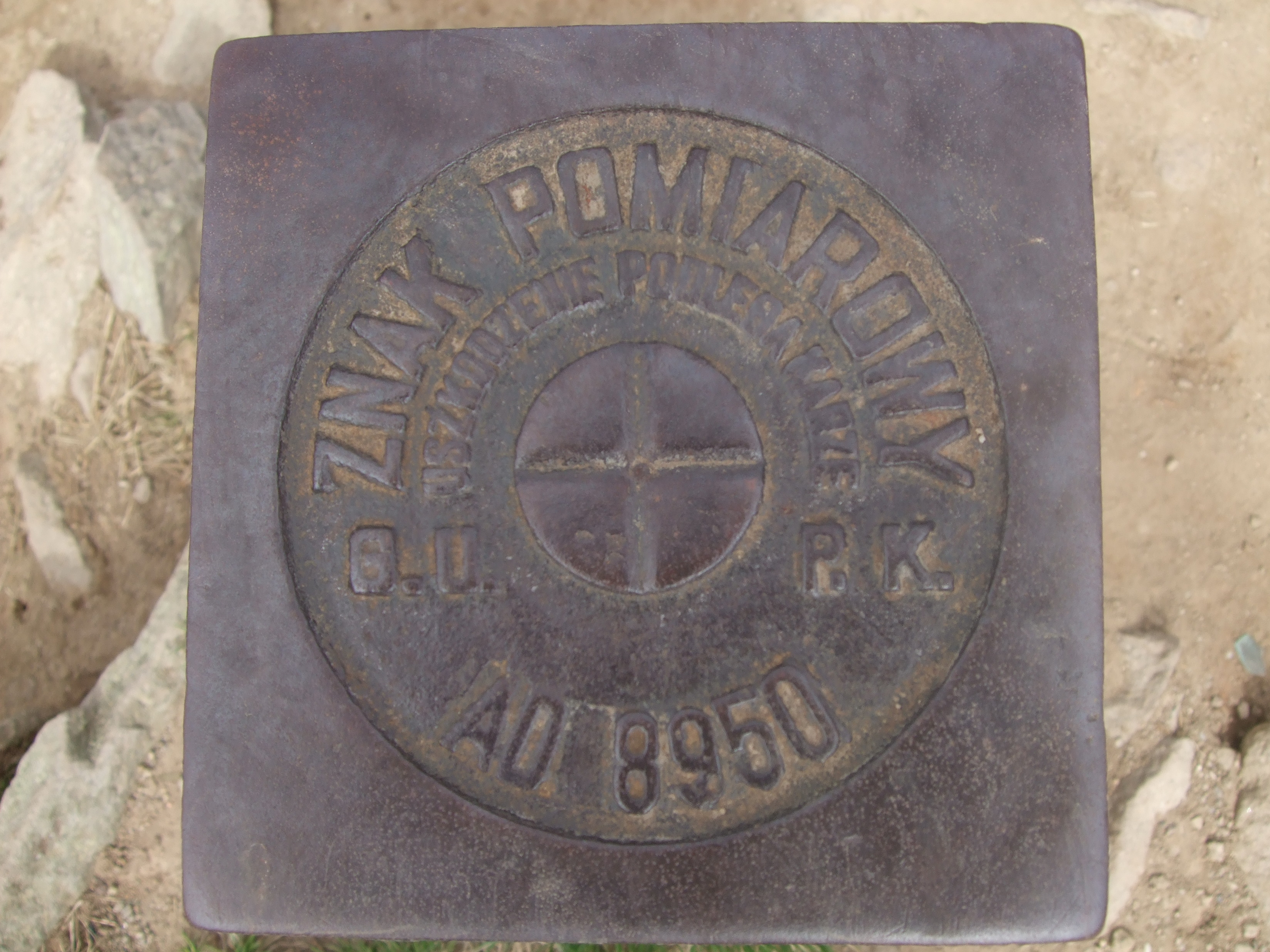
2nd class survey marker

== See also ==
- Bieszczady Mountains
- Brzegi Górne
- Ustrzyki Górne
- Polonyna (montane meadow)
