= Wołosaty =

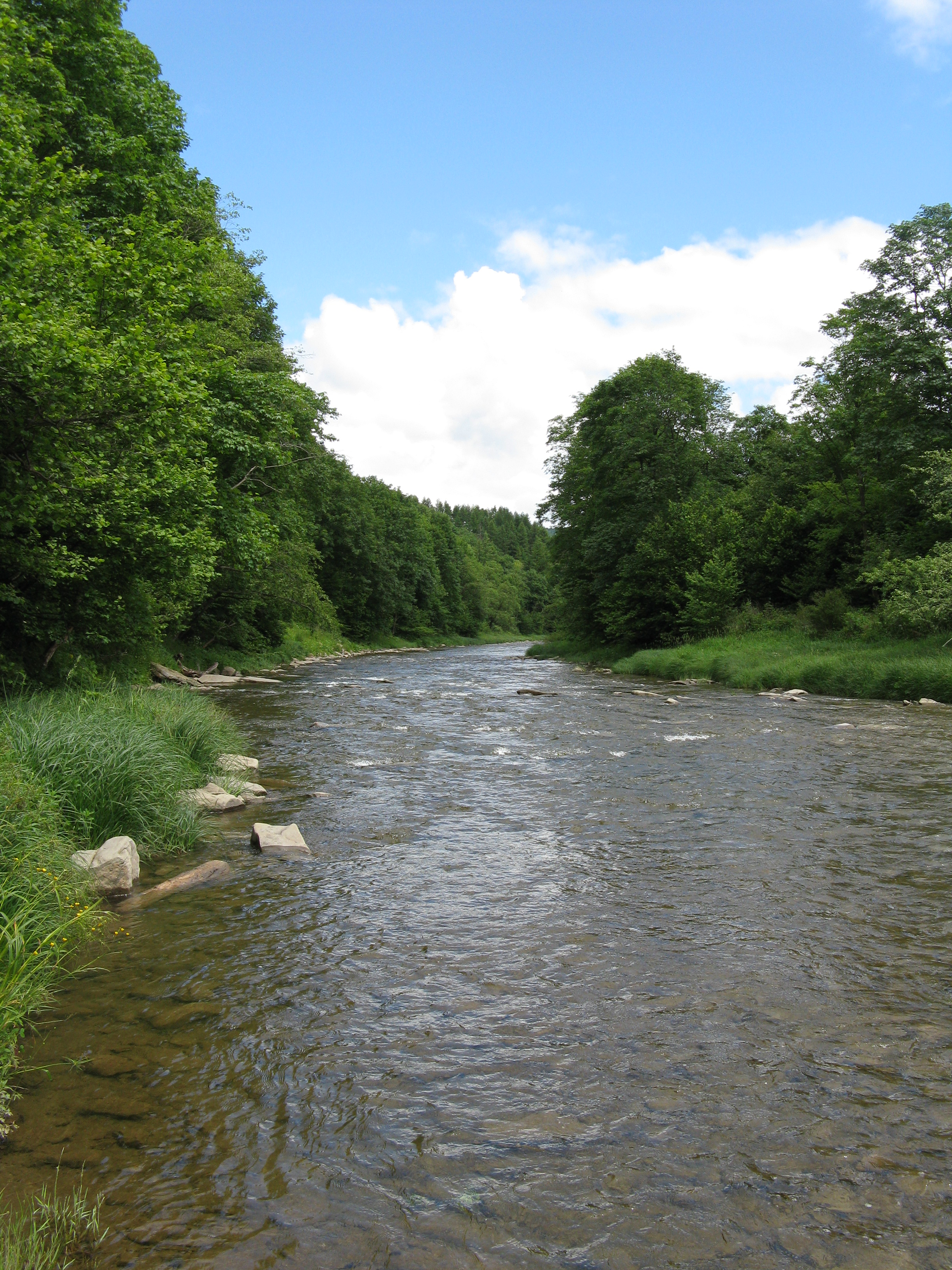
- Wołosaty near Pszczeliny

Location
- Country: Poland
- Voivodeship: Podkarpackie
- County (Powiat): Bieszczady
- Gmina: Gmina Lutowiska

Physical characteristics
- Source
  - location: near Ustrzyki Górne
  - coordinates: 49°06′18″N 22°38′55″E
  - elevation: 1,140 m (3,740 ft)
- Mouth: San
  - location: north of Stuposiany
  - coordinates: 49°11′48″N 22°40′54″E
  - elevation: 550 m (1,800 ft)
- Length: 27.8 km (17.3 mi)
- Basin size: 118.2 km^{2} (45.6 mi^{2})

Basin features
- Progression: San→ Vistula→ Baltic Sea

Wołosaty is a river in the Western Bieszczady Mountains, a left tributary of the San River. Its length is 27.8 km, and its drainage basin covers an area of 118.2 km^{2}[1]. The source is located in the Tarnica massif, on the southern slope of Kopa Bukowska (approximately 1140 m above sea level), and the mouth is in Stuposiany (approximately 550 m above sea level). The valley is traversed by provincial roads: number 897 on the section between Ustrzyki Górne and Wołosate, and 896 (part of the great Bieszczady loop) between Ustrzyki Górne and Stuposiany.

The Wołosaty Valley lies within the Western Bieszczady Mountains, part of the Eastern Carpathians, and forms part of the forest complexes included in the 2021 extension of the UNESCO World Heritage Site Ancient and Primeval Beech Forests of the Carpathians and Other Regions of Europe.

== Course ==
The upper section of the river is called Wołosatka. Flowing northwest through Wołosate, it separates the Tarnica massif from the border range. In Ustrzyki Górne, the Terebowiec stream flows into it from the right, and then the Rzeczyca stream from the left. From this point, the name changes to "Wołosaty". Further on, the river flows north, between Połonina Caryńska, Magura Stuposiańska, and Kosowiec on the left, and the ridges of the Tarnica group on the right, passing through the villages of Bereżki, Pszczeliny, and Stuposiany, where it flows into the San River[2].

== Flora and fauna ==
Among the rare plant species found in the Wołosatka valley are the few-flowered sedge and the Eastern Carpathian monkshood [3].

== Main tributaries ==
The main tributaries are:[4]

=== Left ===
Zgniły, Szczawinka, Wołosatczyk, Kanczowa, Rzeczyca, Bystry

=== Right ===
Zworec, Polaniec, Zwór (from below Szeroki Wierch), Zakopaniec, Terebowiec, Zwór (west of Bukowe Berdo)
