= Border Protection Forces =

Border Protection Forces Wojska Ochrony Pogranicza
- Emblem of the Border Protection Forces

- Ensign of vessels of the Border Defence Army
- Abbreviation: BPT, WOP

Agency overview
- Formed: 13 September 1945
- Preceding agency: Straż Graniczna (1928–1939) Border Protection Corps (1924–1939) in the border with the Soviet Union
- Dissolved: 15 May 1991
- Superseding agency: Border Guard

Jurisdictional structure
- Operations jurisdiction: PL

Operational structure
- Parent agency: Ministry of Interior

Notables
- Anniversary: 10 June

Border Protection Forces (Polish: Wojska Ochrony Pogranicza, WOP), also known under its English abbreviation BPT, was the border guard service of the Polish People's Republic from 1945 to 1989. During its 46 years of existence, it repeatedly changed its structural and service subordination, passing from the Ministry of National Defense through the Ministry of Public Security to the Ministry of the Interior, and vice versa, to remain under the Ministry of Interior since 1972. Border Protection Forces soldiers were subject to the same rules and regulations as those of other soldiers of the Polish People's Republic. As a result of political transformation and the setup of the Third Polish Republic, the Border Protection Forces were disbanded on May 16, 1991, and the Border Guard was created in their place as a preventive-type police formation established to protect Poland's borders.

== History ==
=== Foundations ===
On May 17, 1945, the commander of the 2nd Army of the Polish People's Army received the order of the Supreme Commander of the Polish Army No.00264, ordering them to populate the eastern bank of the Odra and Bystrzyca with five infantry divisions: 5, 7, 8, 10 and 12. Parallel to this, another decision of the Supreme Commander of the Polish People's Army moved divisions 7, 8 and 10 further west, to the Odra and Lusatian Neisse lines. All work related to the regrouping and occupation of the state border was scheduled for June 10, 1945. This day became a celebration of the Border Protection Forces fficial establishment. In total, eleven infantry divisions and one armored corps were deployed on the state border. Securing the borders with regular armies lasted until November 1945, until the Border Protection Forces were organized. Until now, the internal structure of the division was the basis in organizing border service. Each division protected a section of the border of about 120–160 km (75–99 mi) long, further subdivided to each 40–70 km (25–43 mi) protected by a regiment which in turn divided to 12–25 km (7.5–15.5 mi) guarded by a battalion and further divided to 8–15 km (5.0–9.3 mi) of border guarded by a company.

=== 1945–1948 ===
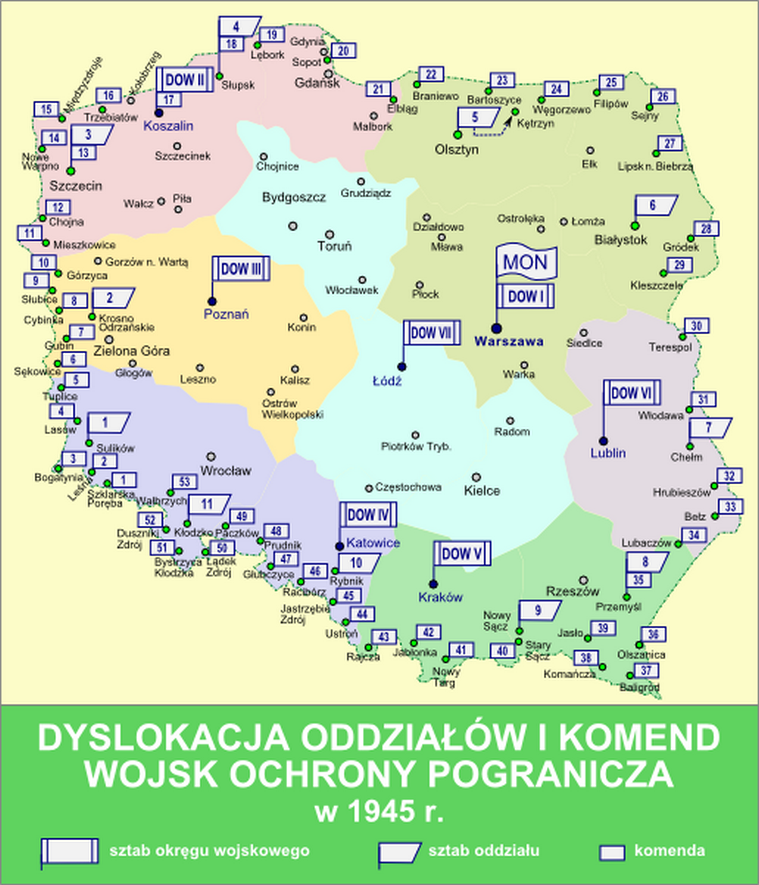
Location of the Border Protection Forces units in 1945

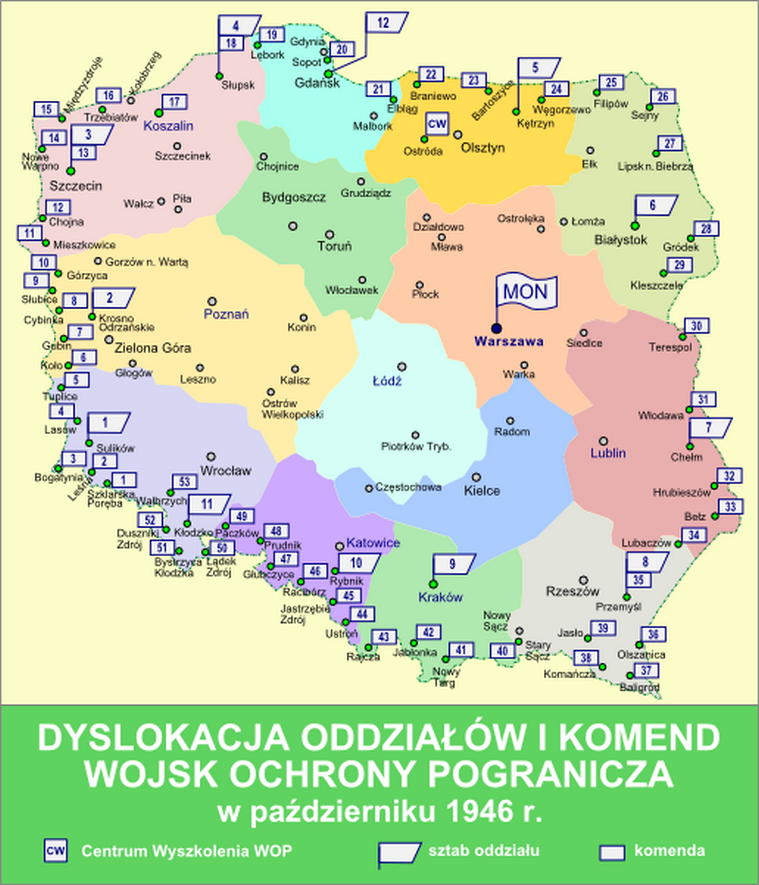
Location of the Border Protection Forces units in October 1946

Border protection by linear units was treated as a transient condition. This problem was resolved by order of the Supreme Commander of the Polish Army No.0245 of September 13, 1945, which created the Border Protection Forces.

On September 27, 1945, the Department Border Protection Forces spectorate was formed. Until February 14, 1946, it was subordinate to the First Deputy Minister of National Defense, Division General Vsevolod Strażewski, and from October 30, 1945, to the Second Deputy Minister of National Defense, general Karol Świerczewski. Full-time employment amounted to 48 military and 155 contract employees. It consisted of the departments of: intelligence, operational-line, combat training, communications, personnel records and the communication section of border conflicts and transitional checkpoints.

The Main Inspectorate of Border Protection organized the protection of state borders and managed specialist services related to border protection. In this respect, he was subject to the departments of the border service of military districts, and through them the border protection departments. Communication between OW's border service departments and border protection units was secured by independent communications campaigns formed in military districts.

BPT departments were created at the level of military districts: BPT I category department at the Command of the Silesian Military District, three BPT II category departments at the Kraków, Pomeranian and Warsaw Military District commands, two BPT III category departments at the Command of the Lublin and Poznan Military Districts. Also formed: 11 BPT branch commands with service sub-units, 53 episode commands, 249 watchtowers, 17 independent communications companies, Independent Dog Training Center.

The BPT department and departments at military districts did not in the strict sense of the word mean the command authorities of the field organizational units, which were the branches and subordinate section commands, watchtowers and transitional checkpoints. These were supervisory and control institutions. The order of September 13 appointed 17 independent communications companies with 99 full-time employees in each. The same order obliged the head of the BPT Department to create a Service Dog Training Center in Ostróda with 82 military positions.

The organizational order of the BPT Department of September 29, 1945, divided the state borders into sections of branches, commands and watchtowers. This order also specified the deployment of troops. According to preliminary assumptions, 1st branch was to be located in Żagań, 2nd in Rzepin, 3rd in Stargard, 4th in Gdańsk, 5th in Węgorzewo, 6th in Sokółka, 7th in Włodawa, 8th in Przemyśl, 9th in Nowy Sącz, 10th in Koźle and 11th in Bolkowice. On average, there were 321.6 km per unit, 66.7 km per command, and 14.4 km per border station. Sections 4 and 9 received the longest sections. Based on the order No.0304 of the Commander-in-Chief of the Polish Army of October 28, 1945, heads of BPT departments at the command of military districts organized on November 15, 1945 to fifty-one border control points (Polish: Przejściowe punkty kontrolne) to control traffic at border crossings, including 27 road, 19 rail, 4 sea and 1 air.

The hurriedly-organized BPT organizational structure had many disadvantages, and so the earliest attention was paid to the improper dislocation of branches and subunits. Formed in the Żagań region, the 1st Department of the BPT was stationed in Sulików for half a year, from April 1946 to move to Lubań Śląski, and the 4th Department formed in Gdańsk to October 1946, stationed in Słupsk, was transferred to Koszalin. The 9th Branch formed in Nowy Sącz was moved to Kraków, and the 5th Branch from Olsztyn to Kętrzyn. The newly formed 12 Division, residing in Sopot until autumn 1946, was moved to Gdańsk.

The Border Protection Inspectorate department and border protection units were reorganized in September 1946. BPT departments in military districts and communication companies for servicing departments were dissolved, subordinating border protection units directly to the BPT Department. Border protection departments were given regional names. The Department formed the Political and Educational Department, the Communications Node and support services. The full-time status of the BPT Department after the reorganization was 96 military and 17 contract employees. On October 1, 1946, the BPT Department assumed the command of protection border units. Supplies remained within military districts. A new 12 BPT branches were established. This branch took over from the 4th Division three section commands - in Lębork, Sopot and Elbląg. The 3rd Division of the OP in Szczecin gave the 4th Division the command of the section in Międzyzdroje, keeping for itself the regions of the Baltic Sea in the vicinity of Świnoujście and the Szczecin Lagoon.

On the southeastern border, the 8th Division in Przemyśl took over the command of the section from the 9th Division 38 and 39. New names have been established for former and reformed BPT branches, mainly originating from their headquarters.

=== 1948–1950 ===
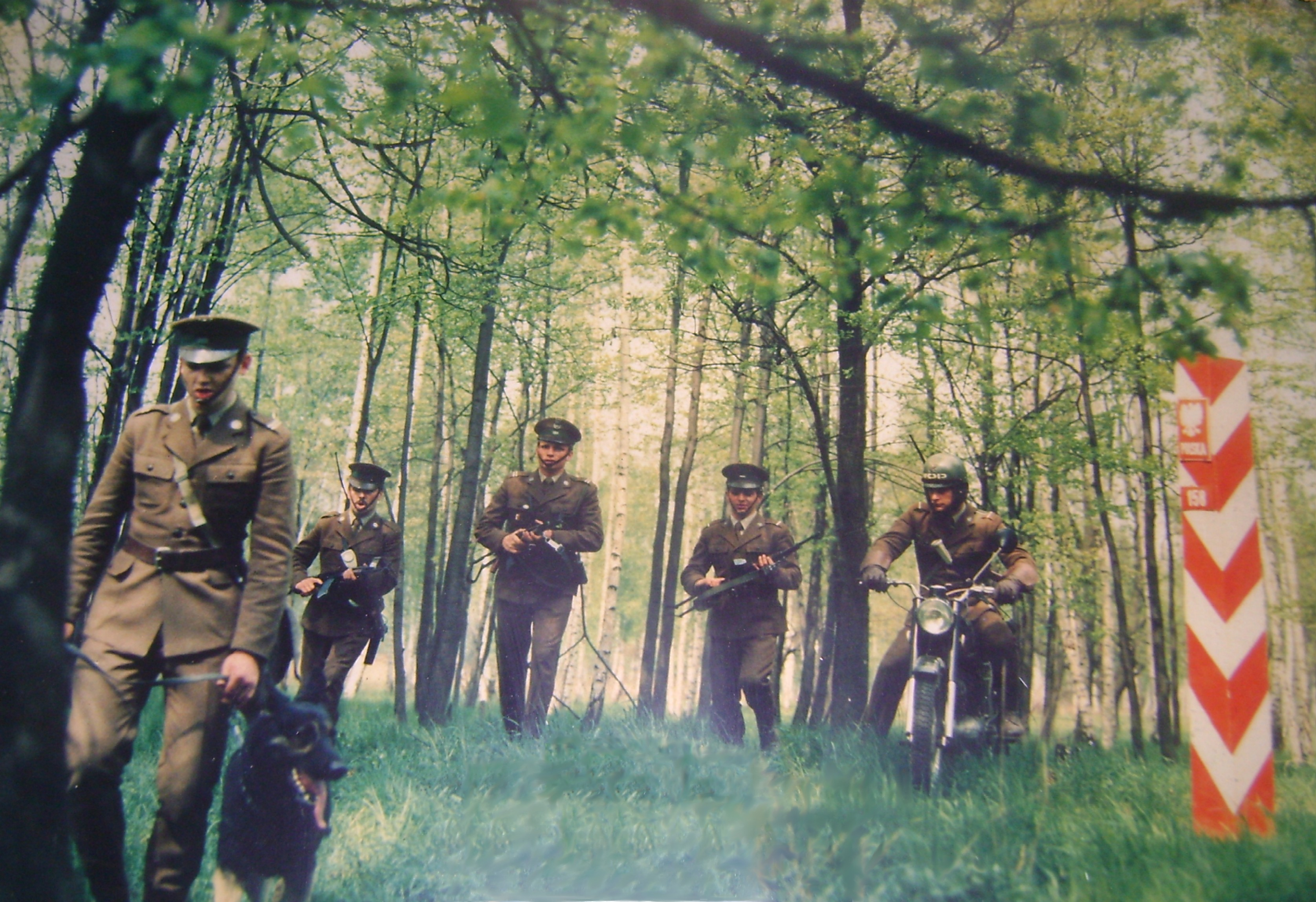
Soldiers at the border post No.158 on the border with the German Democratic Republic, near Pieńsk, Lusatian BPT Brigade

In 1948 the Chief Inspectorate of Border Protection was formed on the basis of the Border Protection Forces Department. It was subordinated to the Second Deputy Minister of National Defense, General Stanisław Popławski.

It consisted of a staff with departments: operational, combat training, organizational and record keeping, border traffic and border conflicts, special communications. In addition, the inspectorate included: Political and Educational Board, Department VII (special), Personnel Department, Quartermaster Inspection Department, Engineering and Sapper Service, Armaments Inspector, Health Department, Communications Node, Prosecutor's Office and Secret Office.

The same order changed the names of the Border Protection Forces branches and subunits: BPF branches were renamed border guard brigades, episode commands into independent border protection battalions, BPT Krosno Command to Krosno independent border protection battalion. The Chief Inspectorate of Border Protection Forces covered twelve border protection brigades, one independent battalion of the Border Protection Forces Training Center and GPK in Okęcie. The supplies of the inspectorate and BPT units were still under the control of the 3rd Deputy Minister of National Defense and military districts.

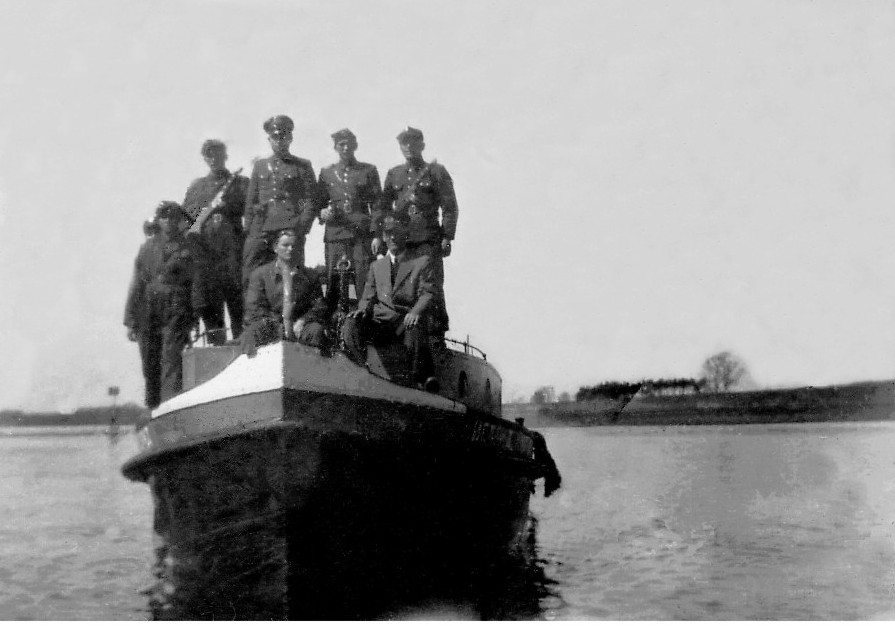
Maritime unit of the Border Protection Forces in Miłów in the 1950s

By order of the Minister of National Defense No.205 of December 4, 1948, on January 1, 1949, the Border Protection Forces was subordinated to the Ministry of Public Security. BPT supplies were taken over by Ministry of Defense voivodeship headquarters. This coincided with the deterioration of international relations, and in the country with the beginning of the fight against right-wing nationalist deviation. BPT was included in the ideological fight. Migration and smuggling began to be treated as espionage or diversionary penetration of the borderland by foreign intelligence agents. Imposing such a view of threats by the management of the Ministry of Public Security resulted in far-reaching organizational and structural changes in the BPT. By November 10, 1948, the last border section was filled in the pressure headland. BPT watchtowers were built in Wetlina, Ustrzyki Górne, Stuposiany, Dwernik and Hulsk.

On January 1, 1949, there were 2,673 officer positions at the BPT. 2070 of them were planted. Deficiencies reached about 23%. Officers of peasant (40.6%) and workers (37.5%) were the largest group of soldiers. 79% of the soldiers were conscripts of the Polish People's Army, 16% of the pre-war Polish Army, while the remaining 5% were citizens of the USSR and officers of the Soviet Armed Forces. In September 1949, port security battalions were formed, changing the system of border protection in their area and including fishing traffic under constant control. During this period, sections of the border protected by the OP brigades were corrected and corresponded to the borders of Voivodeships, and sections of independent OP battalions to the borders of the powiats. This was to improve cooperation between the Home Army troops and powiat and voivodeship party organs, Public Security Service and public administration.

To give border protection a greater prestige and rank, emphasizing the military nature of this formation, from January 1, 1950, the names of units returned to the earlier designation: Border Protection Forces.

In accordance with Order No. 41 of the Council of Ministers of June 24, 1965 the Border Protection Forces were subordinated to the Ministry of National Defence.

=== 1983–1991 ===
After the martial law, border battalions were reconstructed. Battalions were re-established in Sanok, Nowy Targ, Cieszyn, Racibórz, Prudnik, Zgorzelec, Gubin, Słubice and Chojna. The organization of battalions in Nowy Sącz, Lubań Śląski and Szczecin was stopped at the stage of the backbone commands. These were later disbanded.

In 1991, due to the liquidation of the formation, the Border Protection Forces staff was formally released to the reserve and, on a voluntary basis, entered service as officers of the newly formed Border Guard.

== See also ==
- Kresy
- Oder–Neisse line
- Curzon Line
- Recovered Territories
- Territorial changes of Poland immediately after World War II
- Border Agreement between Poland and the USSR of 16 August 1945
- 1951 Polish–Soviet territorial exchange
- Treaty of Zgorzelec
- German–Polish Border Treaty
