= Ustrzyki Górne =

- Village
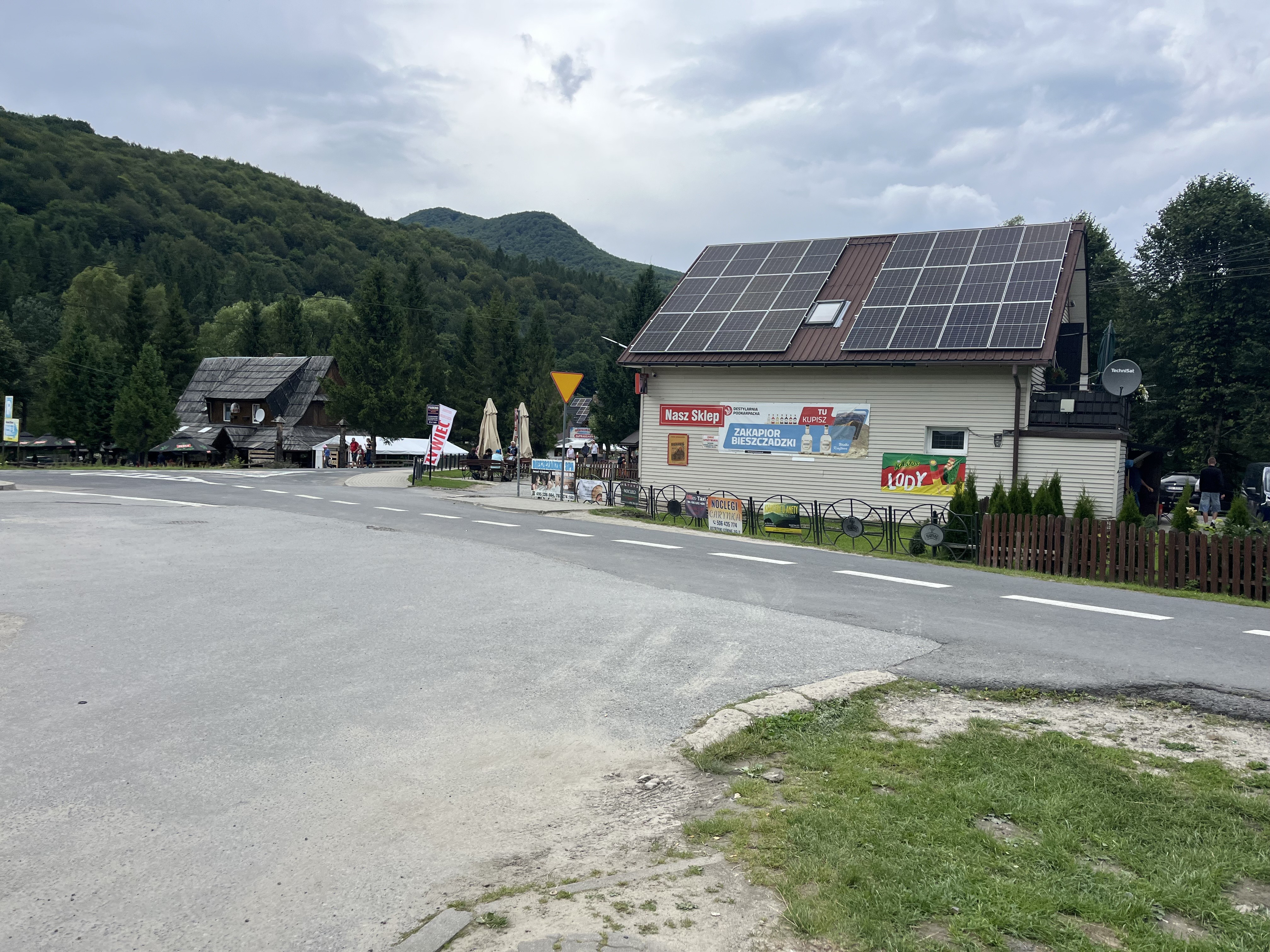
- Central Ustrzyki Górne
- Interactive map of Ustrzyki Górne
- Location within Poland
- Coordinates: 49°6′17″N 22°39′2″E
- Country: Poland
- Voivodeship: Subcarpathian
- County: Bieszczady
- Gmina: Lutowiska
- Elevation: 650 m (2,130 ft)
- Population: 82
  - Density: 2.04/km^{2} (5.3/sq mi)

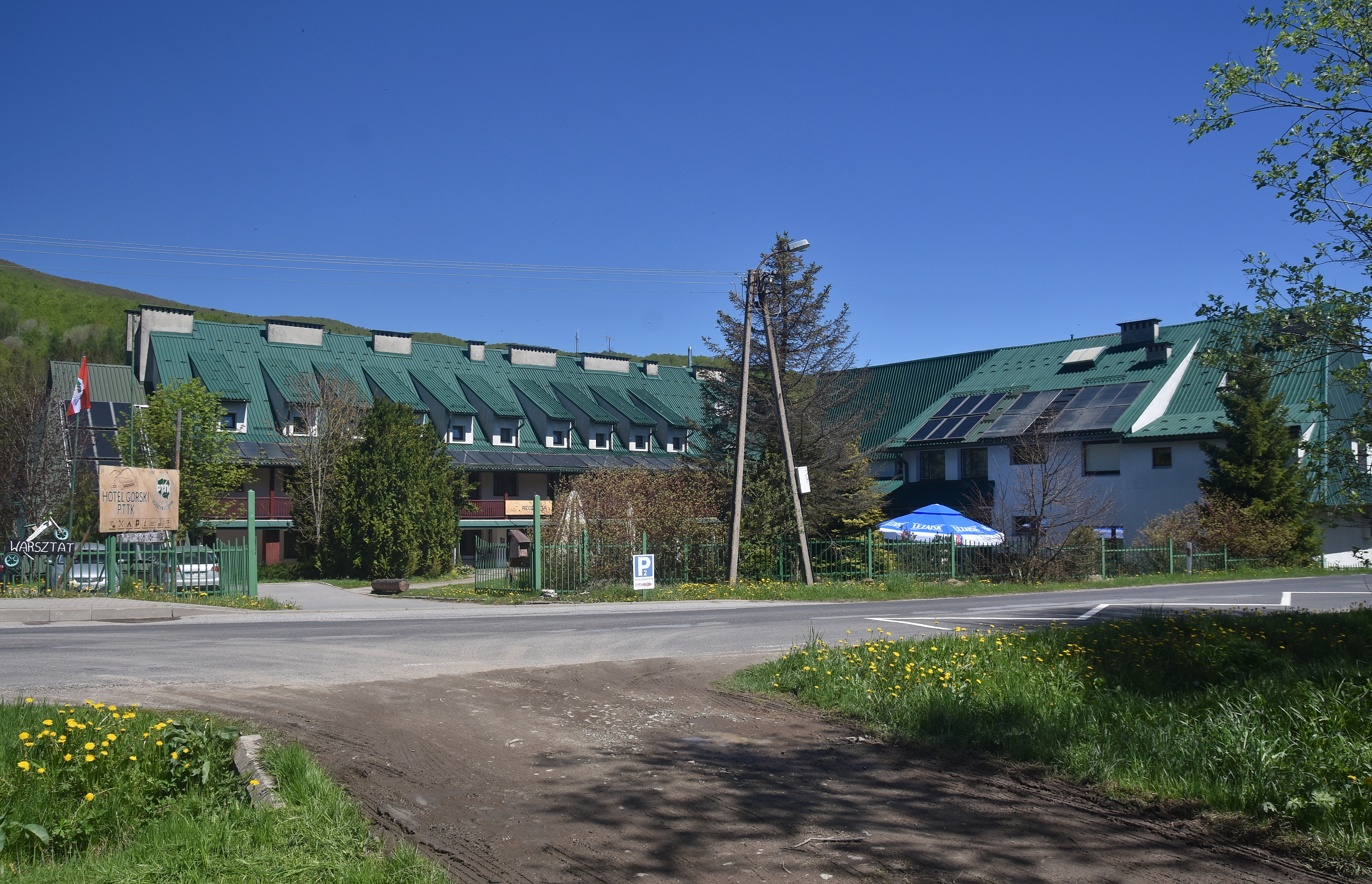
The PTTK hotel in Ustrzyki Górne

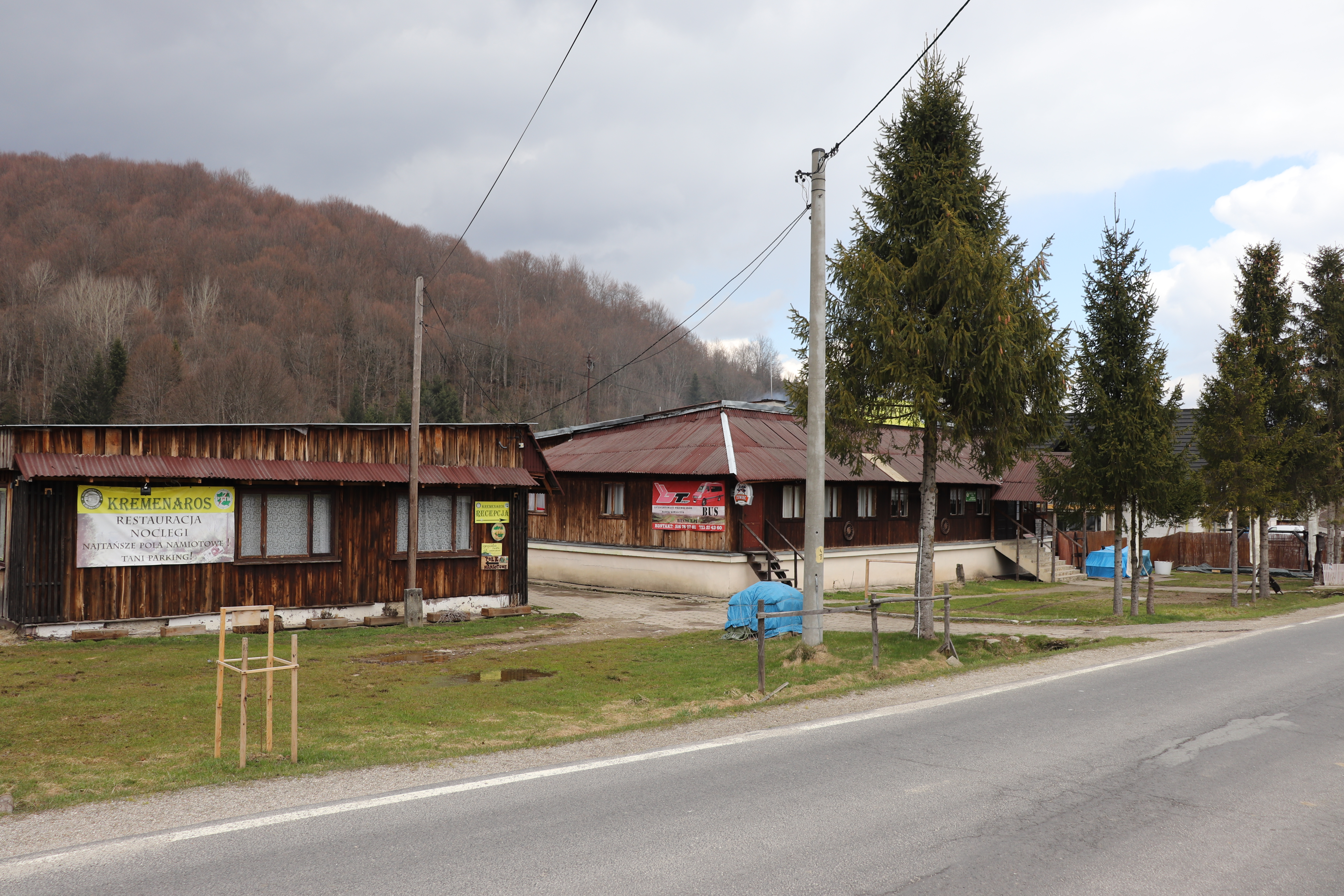
The beginning of the hiking trail to Krzemieniec

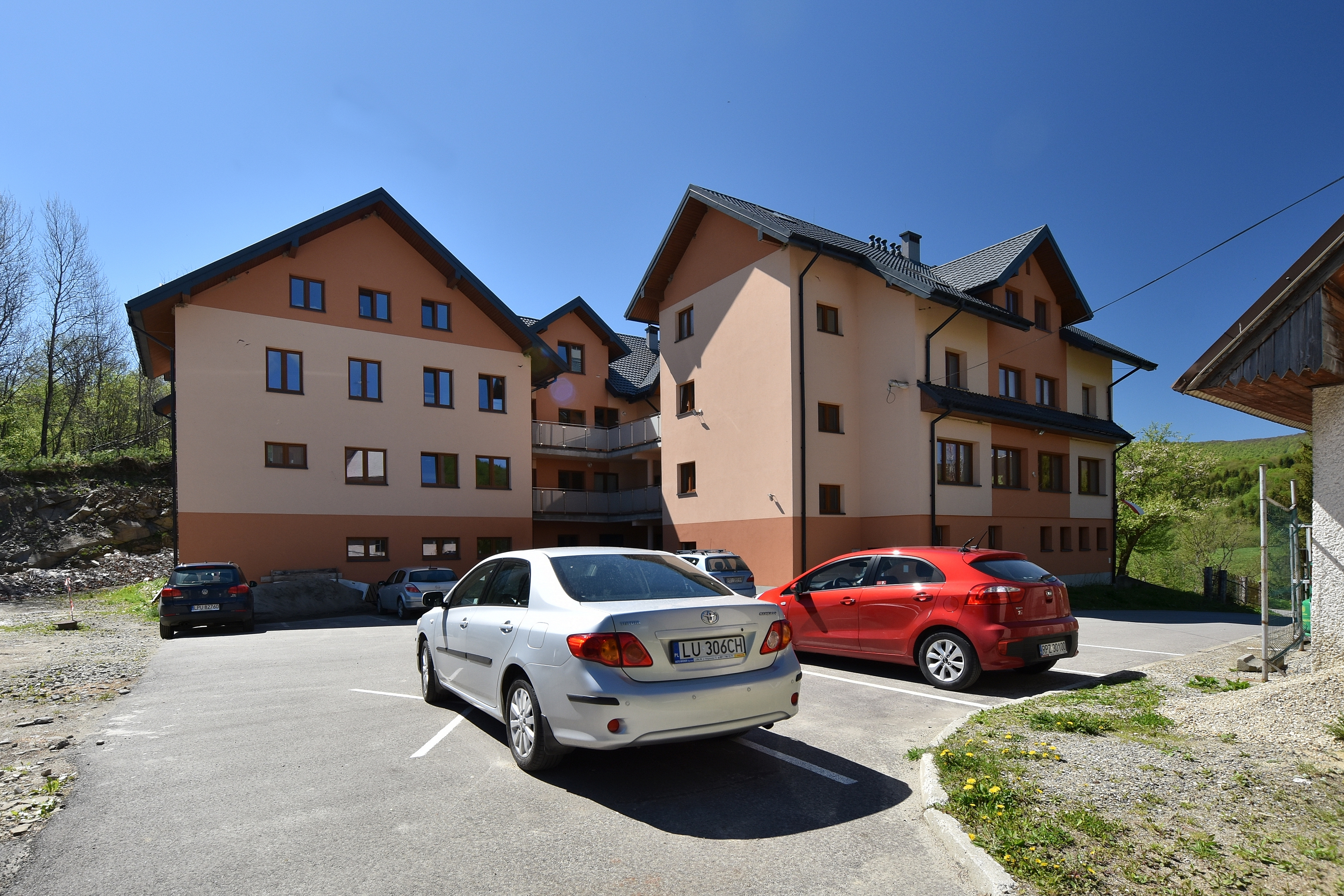
The Dom Rekolekcyjny, a lodge operated by the local church

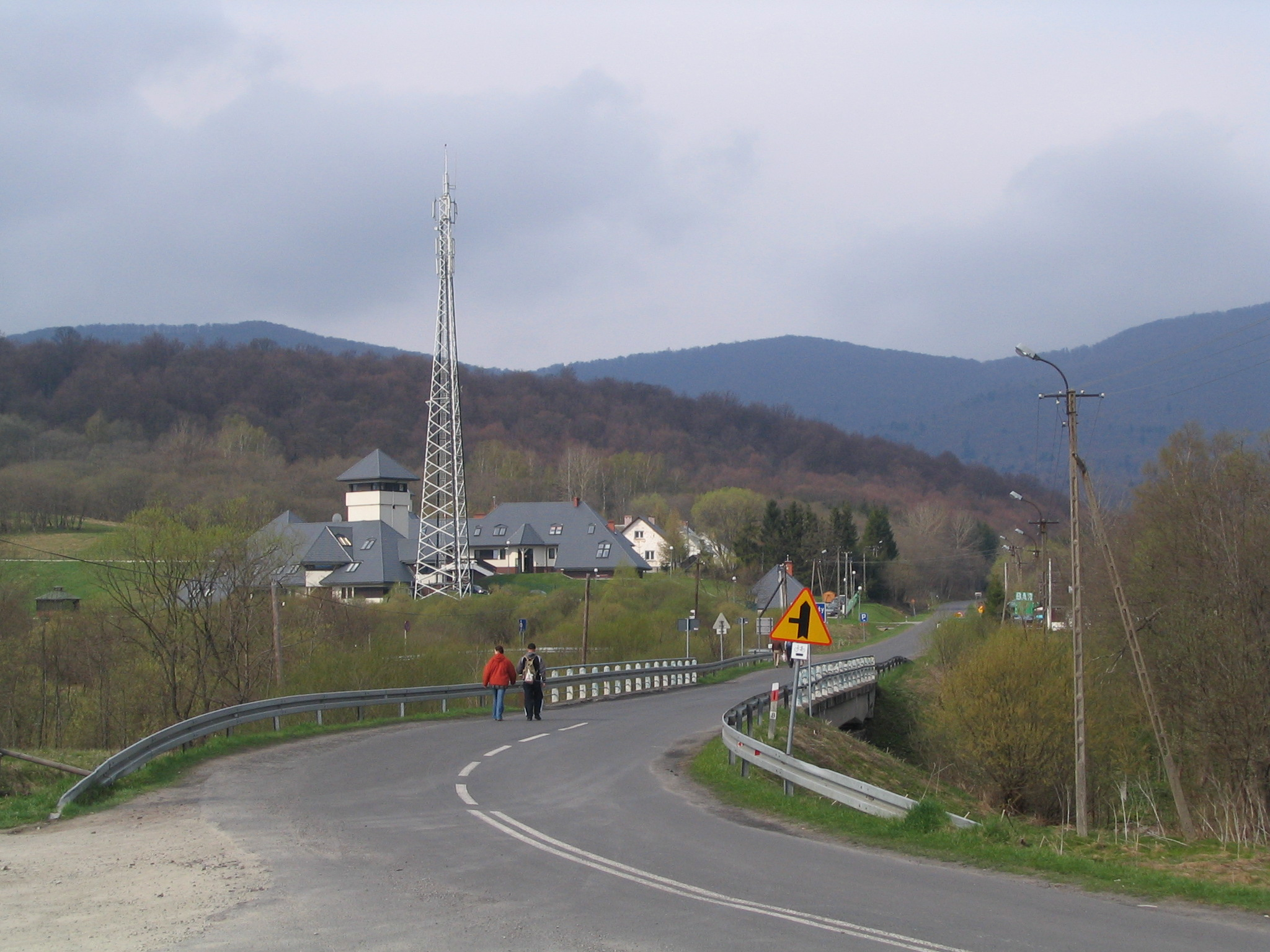
Entering the village, with Połonina Caryńska and a Border Guard station in the distance

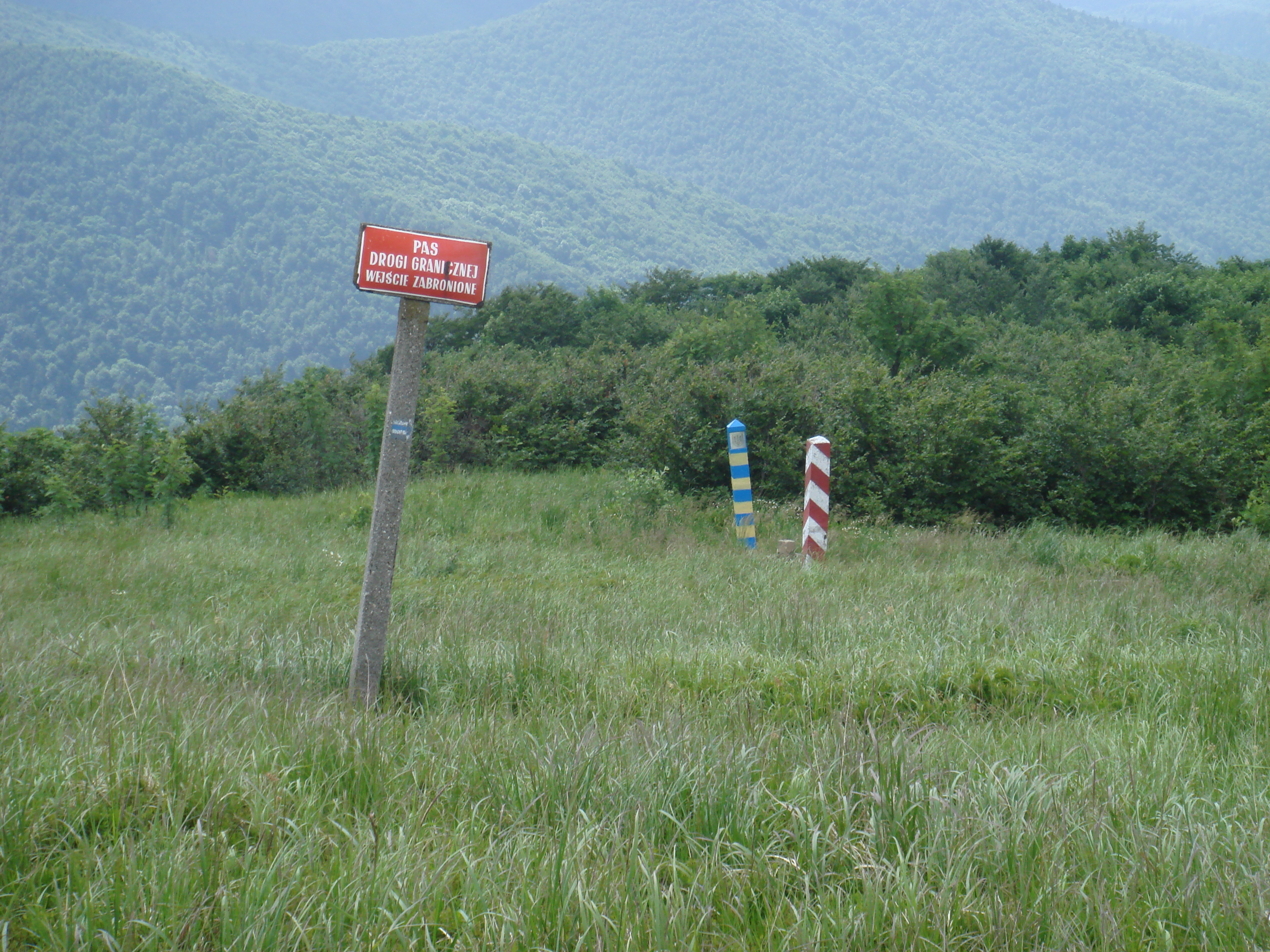
The border of Poland and Ukraine near Ustrzyki Górne

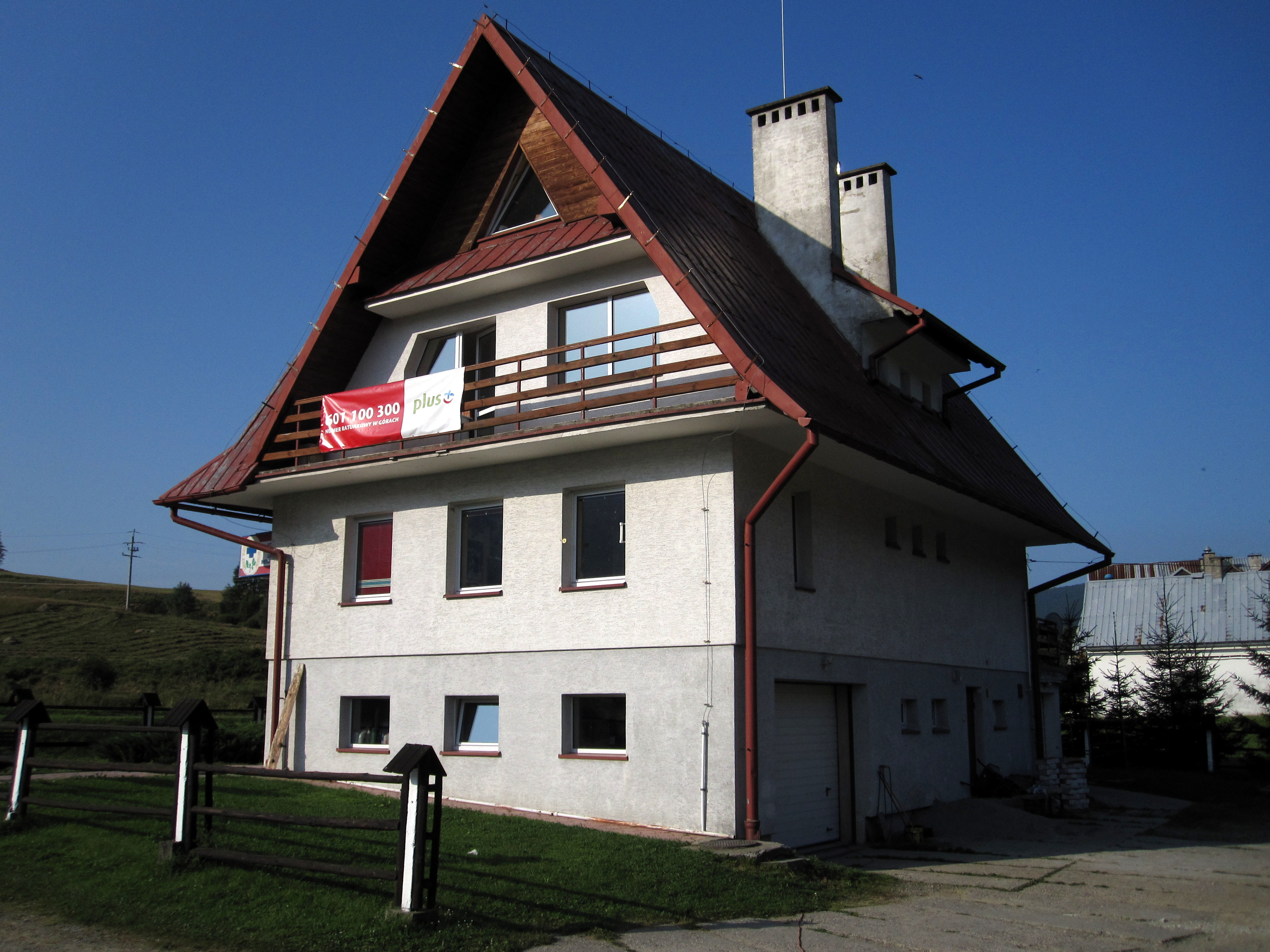
A building belonging to the Mountain Volunteer Search and Rescue

Ustrzyki Górne (Polish: [uˈstʂɨkʲi ˈɡurnɛ]) is a village located in the Bieszczady National Park. Administratively, it is found in Bieszczady County, Podkarpackie Voivodeship, Poland. Found at the centre of the park, it is home to several of its institutions, including its directorate, and is an important location for the local tourism industry. It was completely destroyed in 1946 by the Ukrainian Insurgent Army and was gradually rebuilt, today being a major location for visitors to the Bieszczady Mountains.

== Etymology ==
Ustrzyki Górne was first recorded in 1529 as Czerthezy ville Stupossyan. Its current name, Ustrzyki, comes from the Rusyn term ustje riky, meaning "mouth of a river".

== Location and characteristics ==
Ustrzyki Górne is located in the Bieszczady Mountains, within the Bieszczady National Park. It lies in Gmina Lutowiska, Bieszczady County, Podkarpackie Voivodeship. It is located on the Wołosaty stream, specifically at its confluence with the Rzeczyca and Terebowiec streams.

It is the headquarters of the directorate of the Bieszczady National Park and contains one of the seven regional stations of the Mountain Volunteer Search and Rescue, a non-profit mountain rescue organization. Its members use Ustrzyki Górne as a starting point for operations on nearby mountains such as Połonina Caryńska, Mała Rawka, and Tarnica. The Border Guard is also present in Ustrzyki Górne on account of its proximity to the borders with Slovakia and Ukraine.

=== Tourist attractions ===
Notable attractions in Ustrzyki Górne include a museum of mountain tourism, one of the many such museums organized by the Polish Tourist and Sightseeing Society, and the last of them to be founded, having been opened in 1991. Constructed within a former mountain hut known as the Green House (Zielony Domek), it is open only in July and August.

Ustrzyki Górne is also one of the most advantageous starting points for many peaks of the Bieszczady Mountains. It is directly connected by trails to Wielka Rawka and Kremenaros, as well as to Połonina Caryńska, Tarnica, and Wołosate. Furthermore, it is home to several hotels and guesthouses for visitors.

=== Paths and trails ===
There are two trails going through Ustrzyki Górne, both part of the E8 European long distance path:

Final section of the Main Beskid Trail: Połonina Wetlińska – Brzegi Górne – Połonina Caryńska – Ustrzyki Górne – Szeroki Wierch – Halicz – Rozsypaniec – Wołosate

Border trail: Kremenaros – Wielka Rawka – Ustrzyki Górne – Wołosate – Tarnica (proximity) – Bukowe Berdo – Widełki

== History ==
=== Initial settlement and prior events ===
Ustrzyki Górne was first settled in the Neolithic period. According to Tadeusz Sulimirski (1898–1983), a professor at Jagiellonian University at the time of the Second Polish Republic, the first settlers of the area were the ancient Thracians.

In the early 14th century, the Kmit family, a szlachta family residing in a castle in Wiśnicz, noticed the lands south of their possessions were almost entirely uninhabited and organized a settlement effort in the Bieszczady. According to the borders of their lands that Przemysław Dąbkowski described in his 1931 work Ziemia Sanocka w XV stuleciu, modern Ustrzyki Górne was at the edge of the Kmits' possessions.

The village was found at the location where two other streams, the Terebowiec and Rzeczyca, flowed into the Wołosaty. The area was settled because of its fertile soil and the relative protection provided by the forests surrounding it. Settlers were granted wolnizna, exempting them from all taxes, rents, and payments to the king or any other overlord.

The process succeeded in creating a village in what today is Ustrzyki Górne. Said village was first mentioned in 1529 as Czterthezy ville Stupossyan. This suggests it was founded by inhabitants of Stuposiany, a nearby village. Their settlement effort was successful, as evidenced by another record mentioning the village (then named Ustryki) existing in 1580, in a document partitioning the lands of the Kmit family following the death of its patriarch.

=== Early modern period (1580–1772) ===
In said partition, Ustrzyki were given to Jadwiga ze Stadnickich Tarłowa. By 1589, Ustrzyki were already recorded as paying taxes, suggesting that the 24-year wolnizna had ended and that the area had been settled before 1565. They were then owned by the Dwernicki family, followed by the Ustrzycki family. To distinguish Ustrzyki from their main seat of power, Ustrzyki Dolne, the former was named Ustrzyki Górne (Upper Ustrzyki) due to its mountainous location, whilst the more important Ustrzyki was named Ustrzyki Dolne (Lower Ustrzyki) in contrast with the other village of the same name.

Maciej Stanisław Ustrzycki, a noble who had owned Ustrzyki Górne since 1662, was awarded for his services to Poland by being given the much more desirable Ustrzyki Dolne instead of Górne. Ustrzyki Górne, in turn, fell into the hands of the King of Poland, by whom it would be ruled until the loss of Polish sovereignty. Conditions for settlers in Ustrzyki Górne were tough, as were for most settlers in the area around the time. The village was subjected to repeated raids in the 15th and 16th century.

For much of its history, Ustrzyki Górne was inhabited by Boykos. Farming in Ustrzyki Górne mostly focused on oats and barley. Potatoes and lettuce were later introduced, and small amounts of beetroots, rutabagas, and carrots were also harvested. The village was also granted rights to allow its cattle to graze on nearby mountains, such as Połonina Caryńska. Grazing formed the backbone of the area's agricultural economy and the area's cattle was known across the region for its fine quality.

=== Austrian rule (1772–1918) ===
In 1777, the village's tenant lost the financial ability to maintain it. 2 years later, in 1779, it was acquired by the city of Dobromyl, which put it up for sale in 1819, alongside the neighbouring town of Wołosate. It was purchased by Jakób and Józef Rittner for a total of 8,251 Rhine złoty. They aimed to make Ustrzyki Górne their family's central property, constructing a family cemetery there. After the First Partition of Poland, the area fell into stagnation, but the restored political order eventually resulted in a return to relative prosperity.

The village remained in the hands of the Rittners until 1848. The exact details of who its next owners were are not certain. Between 1862 and 1868, it belonged to the Austrian noble Uso Künsberg von Langenstadt; in 1879, to August Künsberg; and in 1881, Zefiryna Pilatowska sold it to Dr. Samuel Unger. The same year, Samuel sold it to Kornelia Langenstadt, baroness of Künsberg, who, in 1884, handed the rights to the village to August Nowak.

=== Polish rule (1918–1939) ===
The village's modernization began in the 1920s, when its then-owner, Feiwel Adlersberg, noted the potential for developing the lumber industry in Ustrzyki Górne. He assisted in successfully lengthening the Bieszczady Forest Railway from Stuposiany to the remote village. It brought Adlersberg and the village significant profits for many years, but due to the effects of the Great Depression, the owner of Stuposiany Władysław Herman made the decision to end service on the part of the railway he owned. It was then sold for scrap.

Although Adlersberg's economic ventures were intensive, they did not result in any major environmental devastation. The forests around Ustrzyki Górne remain largely intact to this day, as both the terrain and environmental challenges, such as the significant population of bears and lynxes, discouraged lumber industry activity. A station of the Polish Customs Guard operated there from 1920 to 1928, later transforming into a station of the Border Guard.

=== World War II, destruction, and depopulation (1939–1947) ===
The years of German occupation in Ustrzyki Górne are not known about in detail. It is known that the German occupiers employed the locals in operating charcoal furnaces and cutting beech wood. The village was liberated by the Red Army on 27 September 1944. Although Ustrzyki Górne managed to survive World War II without significant changes, it would be wiped off the map in the events following the war.

As early as the summer of 1944, an Insurgent Army unit, named after Pavlo Polubotok, began gathering in the forests between Brzegi Górne, Wołosate, and Ustrzyki Górne. It was led by a sotnik with the surname Pavlenko who was a member of the Melnykites. From 1944 to 1946, the area was practically governed by the Insurgent Army. Its local leader in Ustrzyki Górne was Vasil Shyshkanynets, pseudonym "Bir".

As the fighting between the Soviet government and the Insurgent Army intensified, Shyshkanynets came to the realization it was a battle that the Insurgent Army would lose. Consequently, in June 1946, Shyshkanynets and his men burnt the village down to make future settlement efforts more difficult. The remaining Polish inhabitants, now lacking a home, were moved to the Soviet Union. On 23 April 1947, during Operation Vistula, the town's remaining Ukrainian population was deported, leaving it fully depopulated. The methods of deportation were highly non-humanitarian, as was the case with similar events in most other villages during the operation.

=== Rebuilding and modern day (1947–today) ===
The village, burnt down and depopulated, was described by Jan Gerhard, an officer of the French Résistance and Polish People's Army, as overgrown with weeds and containing "only a cluster of thatch-covered huts". The next construction there was a station of the Border Protection Forces. As the area was on the Polish border, it was heavily guarded and access was restricted, but even in the face of the restrictions, the Polish Tourist and Sightseeing Society set up camping locations in Ustrzyki Górne as early as 1950.

Practically cut off from the outside world, Ustrzyki Górne was mostly visited by hikers, including Andrzej Mularczyk, who described the often unwelcoming conditions vividly in a 1957 report, Przychodzą, sam nie wiem, z której strony; as he noted in the report, in the late 1950s, it was inhabited mostly by members of the Border Protection Forces, as well as two newlyweds known as the Hartmans. In the 1950s, the lumber industry became active in Ustrzyki Górne once again, but operated with great difficulty.

The only public road leading to Ustrzyki Górne was, by 1958, in detestably bad condition, which contributed to the village's isolation significantly. From 1954 to 1962, a new road across the Bieszczady Mountains was paved and opened to cars, linking Ustrzyki Górne to the rest of the world. Although development and tourist traffic did result in some areas from the construction of the roads, the village remained small and underdeveloped.

The most important building in Ustrzyki Górne was a mountain hut known as the Zielony Domek, where most outside visitors were concentrated. Most of its users belonged to or were in some way tied to the Student Club of Beskid Guides (Polish: Studenckie Koło Przewodników Beskidzkich; SKPB), consisting of various students from universities in Warsaw, which played the most significant role in Ustrzyki Górne's development after the war, assisting in several infrastructure and construction projects, also beginning many themselves. This role became relevant starting in 1959, after the first SKPB tents were set up in Ustrzyki Górne, near a demolished church. They set up a small base, nicknamed Bison Base (Polish: Baza imienia Żubra), which became significant for the inhabitants for the area as a rain shelter. The Polish Scouting and Guiding Association also used the surrounding Bieszczady wilderness for their activities.

The Administration of Forest Construction (Polish: Zarząd Budownictwa Leśnego) of Lesko, alongside various other projects funded by the government, notably created a hotel for workers, most of whom came from Brzozów County and the surrounding areas and worked for its various construction works. This way, it contributed to a working-class local character and further assisted local development. The Mountain Volunteer Search and Rescue station in the village was founded in 1961, and the first search and rescue training for its volunteers took place in 1962. A new building was constructed for its purposes, which, in 1989, was officially named a Regional Station of Mountain Search and Rescue.

Another important location for the community at this time was Pulpit, a restaurant which was the place where much of local folklore originated. In 1981, the directorate of the Bieszczady National Park moved from Pszczeliny to Ustrzyki Górne, bringing it greater governmental attention. On 22 July 1984, a church was opened there, the first in Ustrzyki Górne in several decades. Its opening was a major event for the surrounding area. A lodge run by said church was opened in 1994.

== Demographics ==
According to the 2021 Polish census, Ustrzyki Górne has a population of 82 people, a decrease of 7 from the 2011 figure of 89. Due to its large amount of mountainous, uninhabited terrain, population density in Ustrzyki Górne equals 2.04 people per km^{2}. Of its 82 inhabitants, 37 are women and 45 are men; most (61%) are between 18 and 65 years of age.

=== Historical demographics ===
Historical population
Year	Pop.	±%
1785	171	—
1844 (est.)	250	+46.2%
1879	300	+20.0%
1899	392	+30.7%
1910	494	+26.0%
1921	428	−13.4%
1938	491	+14.7%
1943	482	−1.8%

The village, mostly inhabited by Boykos before its destruction by the Ukrainian Insurgent Army, had a population of 171 as in 1785. It averaged 250 inhabitants between 1844 and 1862, and in 1879, it surpassed 300. In 1899, its population totalled 392. Its highest population number was reached in 1910, at 494 total inhabitants, which had decreased to 428 by 1921 and recovered to 491 by 1938. As of 1943, 482 people lived in Ustrzyki Górne. No population data is available for the immediate post-war period.

Of the village's 428 inhabitants in 1921, 341 were Greek Catholics, 31 were Roman Catholics, and 56 were religious Jews. Meanwhile, 110 inhabitants considered themselves Rusyns, 313 considered themselves Poles, and 5 considered themselves ethnically Jewish.

== Bibliography ==
- Luboński, Paweł (2022). Bieszczady. Przewodnik dla prawdziwego turysty. Piastów: Oficyna Wydawnicza "Rewasz". ISBN 978-83-8122-054-5.
- Bałda, Waldemar (2019). Serce Bieszczadów. Opowieść o Ustrzykach Górnych. Łódź: KSIĘŻNY MŁYN dom wydawniczy Michał Koliński. ISBN 978-83-7729-498-7.
- Dąbkowski, Przemysław Roman (1931). Ziemia sanocka w XV stuleciu. Lviv: Redakcja i Administracja Wschodu. Archived from the original on 30 November 2024.
