= Ustrzyki =

Ustrzyki may refer to the following places in Poland:

- Ustrzyki Dolne
- Ustrzyki Górne
