= Żurawin, Podkarpackie Voivodeship =

Żurawin
- Settlement
- Location within Poland
- Coordinates: 49°13′7″N 22°43′4″E
- Country: Poland
- Voivodeship: Subcarpathian
- County: Bieszczady
- Gmina: Lutowiska

Żurawin [ʐuˈravʲin] is a settlement in the administrative district of Gmina Lutowiska, within Bieszczady County, Subcarpathian Voivodeship, in south-eastern Poland, close to the border with Ukraine.
