= Zatwarnica =

- Village
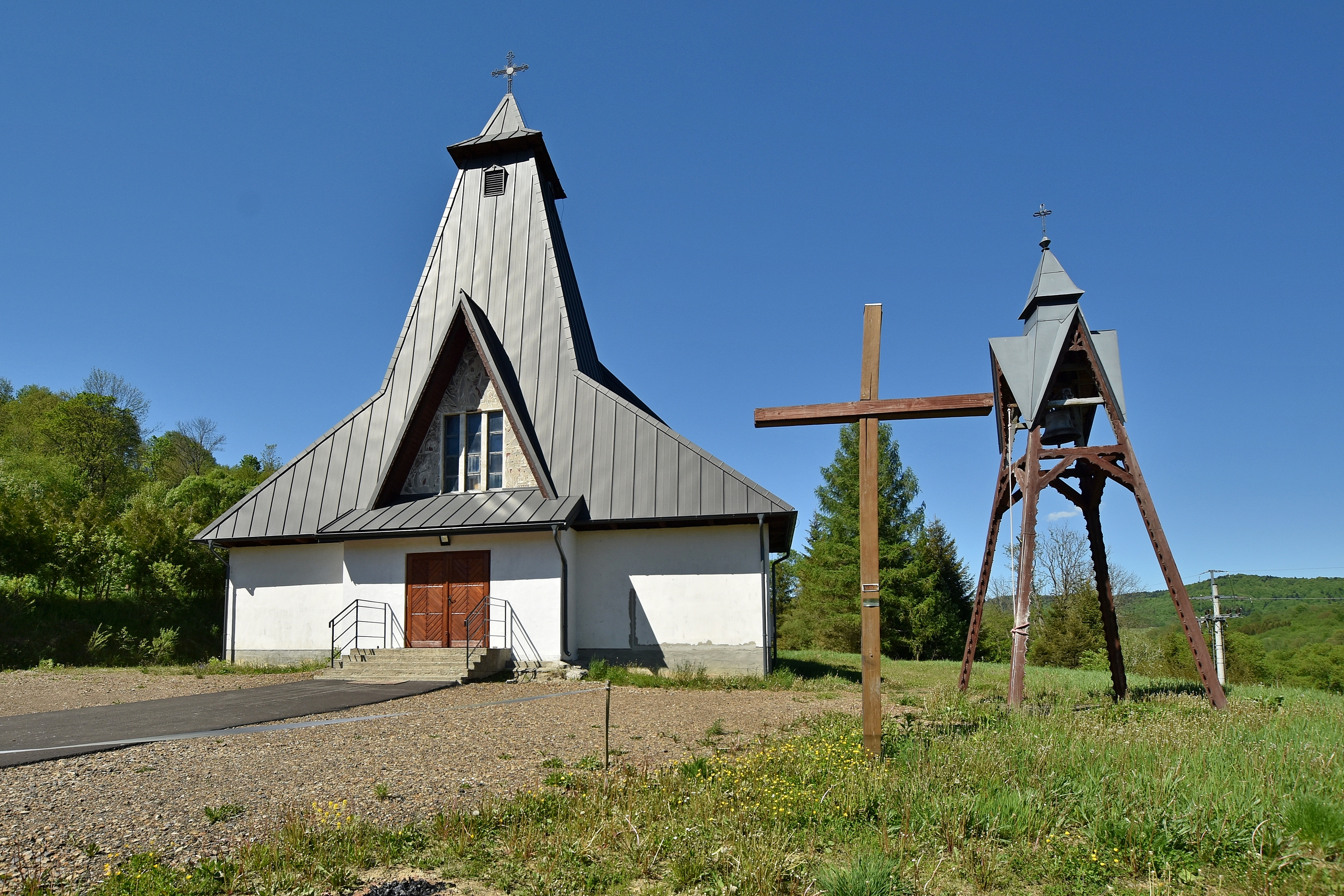
- Church of Christ, the Good Shepherd

- Location within Poland
- Coordinates: 49°13′32″N 22°33′5″E
- Country: Poland
- Voivodeship: Subcarpathian
- County: Bieszczady
- Gmina: Lutowiska

Population
  - Total: 238

Zatwarnica [zatfarˈɲit͡sa] is a village in the administrative district of Gmina Lutowiska, within Bieszczady County, Subcarpathian Voivodeship, in south-eastern Poland, close to the border with Ukraine.
