= Tarnawa Wyżna =

- Village
- Location within Poland
- Coordinates: 49°6′23″N 22°50′28″E
- Country: Poland
- Voivodeship: Subcarpathian
- County: Bieszczady
- Gmina: Lutowiska
- Population: 0

Tarnawa Wyżna [tarˈnava ˈvɨʐna] is a former village in the administrative district of Gmina Lutowiska, within Bieszczady County, Subcarpathian Voivodeship, in south-eastern Poland, close to the border with Ukraine.
