= Lutowiska =

Lutowiska Літовищі Шевченко (1944-1957)
- Village
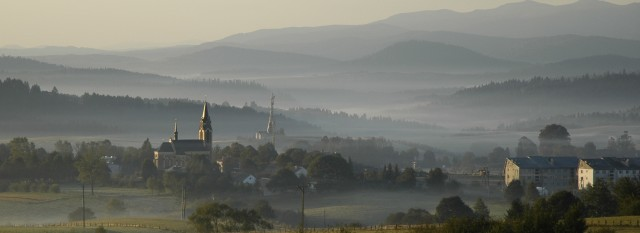
- Lutowiska

- Coat of arms
- Interactive map of Lutowiska
- Location within Poland
- Coordinates: 49°15′4″N 22°41′45″E
- Country: Poland
- Voivodeship: Subcarpathian
- County: Bieszczady
- Gmina: Lutowiska
- Population: 750

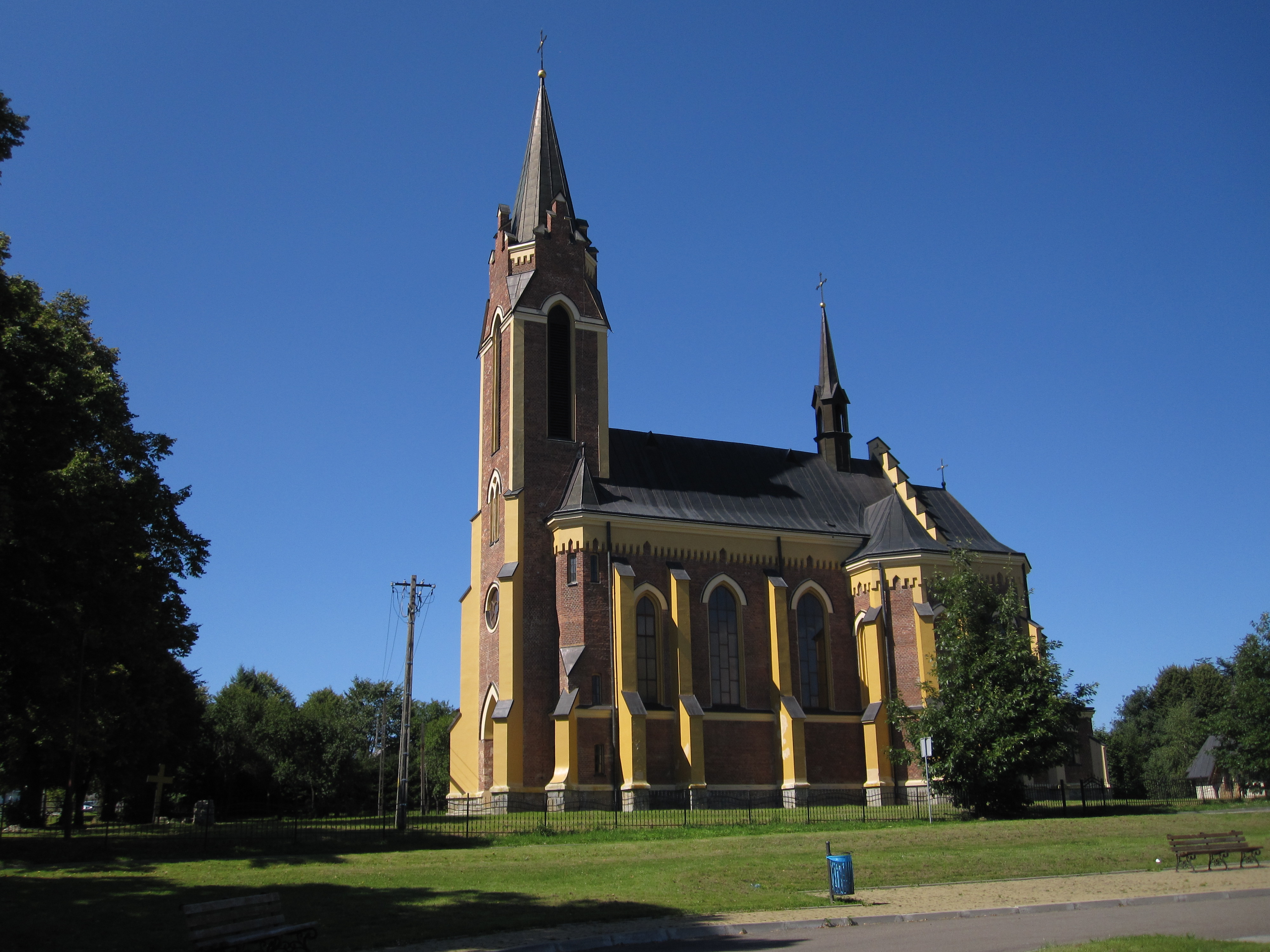
The Catholic Church of St. Stanislaus. Built between 1911 and 1914

Lutowiska [lutɔˈvʲiska] is a village in Bieszczady County, in the Subcarpathian Voivodeship of southeastern Poland, near the border with Ukraine. It is the seat of the gmina (administrative district) called Gmina Lutowiska.

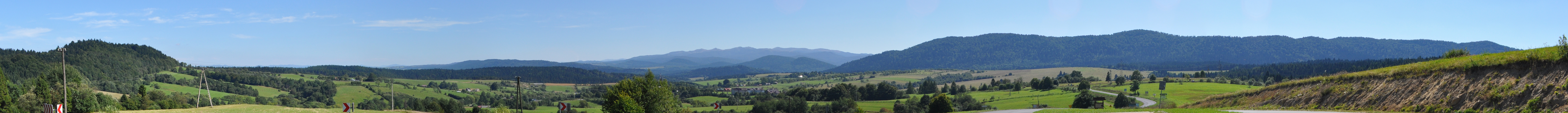
Panorama of Lutowiska

== See also ==
- 1951 Polish–Soviet territorial exchange
