= Bukowiec, Bieszczady County =

Bukowiec
- Village
- Location within Poland
- Coordinates: 49°4′39″N 22°50′33″E
- Country: Poland
- Voivodeship: Subcarpathian
- County: Bieszczady
- Gmina: Lutowiska
- Population: 0

Bukowiec [buˈkɔvʲɛt͡s] is a former village, located in the administrative district of Gmina Solina, within Bieszczady County, Subcarpathian Voivodeship, in south-eastern Poland, close to the border with Ukraine.

In 1996, Bukowiec was among three former villages (the other two were Beniowa and Carynskie) incorporated into Bieszczady National Park.
