= Krywe, Bieszczady County =

Krywe
- Village
- Location within Poland
- Coordinates: 49°15′2″N 22°31′19″E
- Country: Poland
- Voivodeship: Subcarpathian
- County: Bieszczady
- Gmina: Lutowiska
- Population: 1

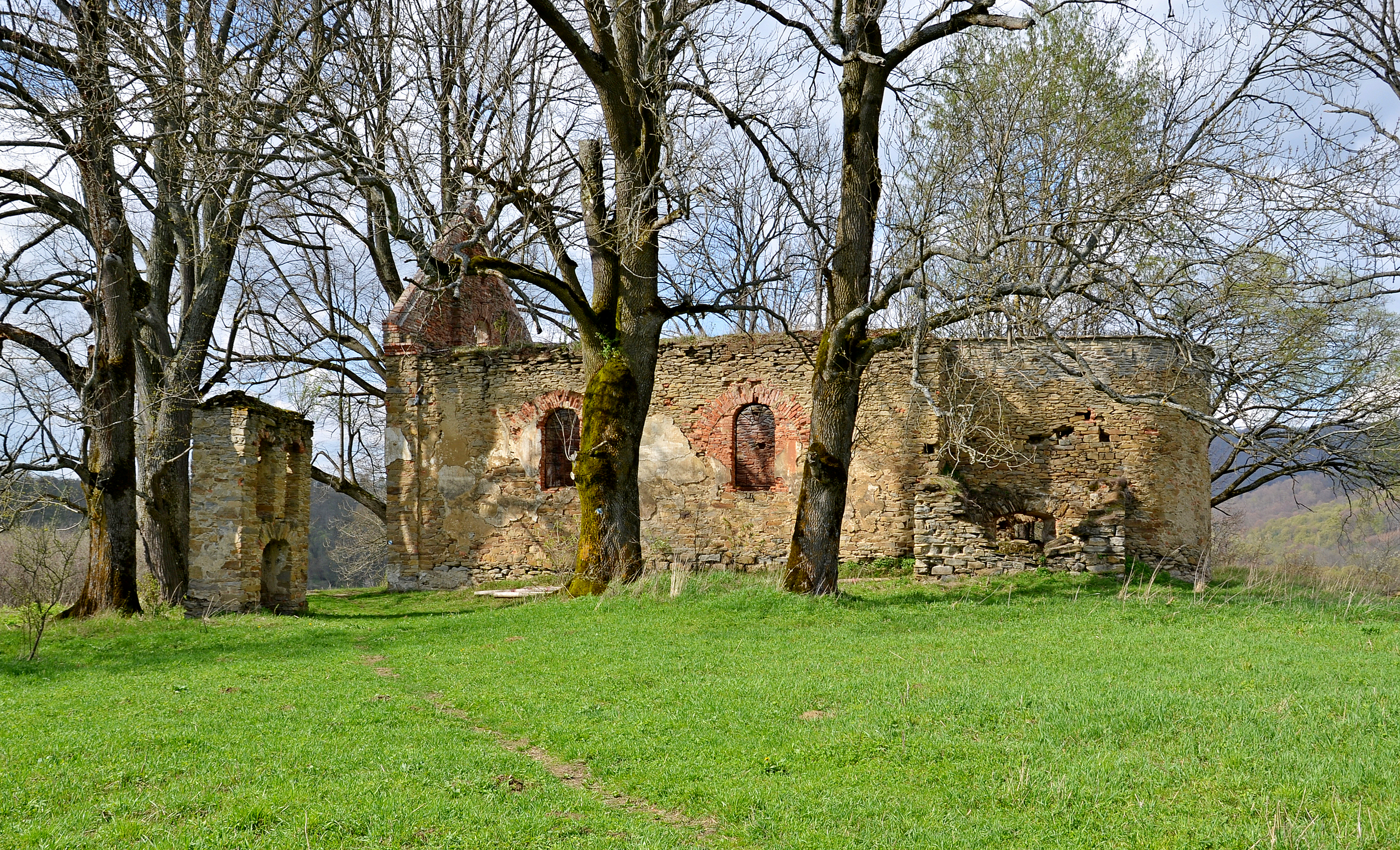
Ruins of church in Krywe

Krywe [ˈkrɨvɛ] is a village in the administrative district of Gmina Lutowiska, within Bieszczady County, Subcarpathian Voivodeship, in south-eastern Poland, close to the border with Ukraine.
