= Łokieć, Bieszczady County =

Łokieć
- Village
- Location within Poland
- Coordinates: 49°9′21″N 22°44′42″E
- Country: Poland
- Voivodeship: Subcarpathian
- County: Bieszczady
- Gmina: Lutowiska
- Population: 0

Łokieć [ˈwɔkʲɛt͡ɕ] is a former village in the administrative district of Gmina Lutowiska, within Bieszczady County, Subcarpathian Voivodeship, in south-eastern Poland, on the border with Ukraine.
