= Dwerniczek =

- Village
- Location within Poland
- Coordinates: 49°18′19″N 22°43′1″E
- Country: Poland
- Voivodeship: Subcarpathian
- County: Bieszczady
- Gmina: Lutowiska
- Population: 70

Dwerniczek [dvɛrˈɲit͡ʂɛk] is a village in the administrative district of Gmina Lutowiska, within Bieszczady County, Subcarpathian Voivodeship, in south-eastern Poland, close to the border with Ukraine.

The San river crosses the area.
