= Hulskie, Podkarpackie Voivodeship =

Hulskie
- Village
- Location within Poland
- Coordinates: 49°14′42″N 22°32′12″E
- Country: Poland
- Voivodeship: Subcarpathian
- County: Bieszczady
- Gmina: Lutowiska
- Population: 3

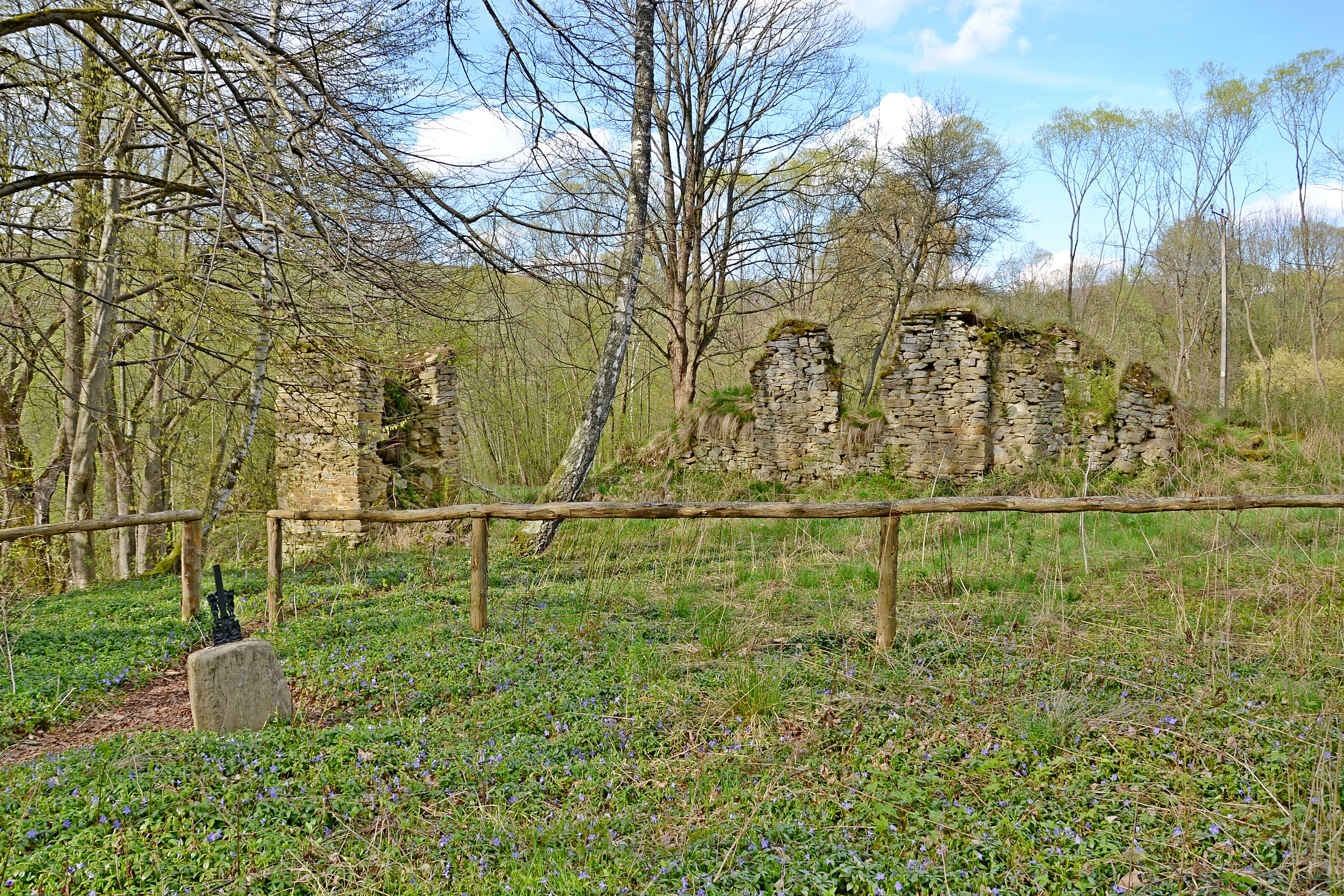
Hulskie - remains of Greek catholic church and cemetery

Hulskie [ˈxulskʲɛ] is a village in the administrative district of Gmina Lutowiska, within Bieszczady County, Subcarpathian Voivodeship, in south-eastern Poland, close to the border with Ukraine.
