= Halicz (Bieszczady) =

Mountain peak in Poland

Coordinates: 49°04′N 22°46′E

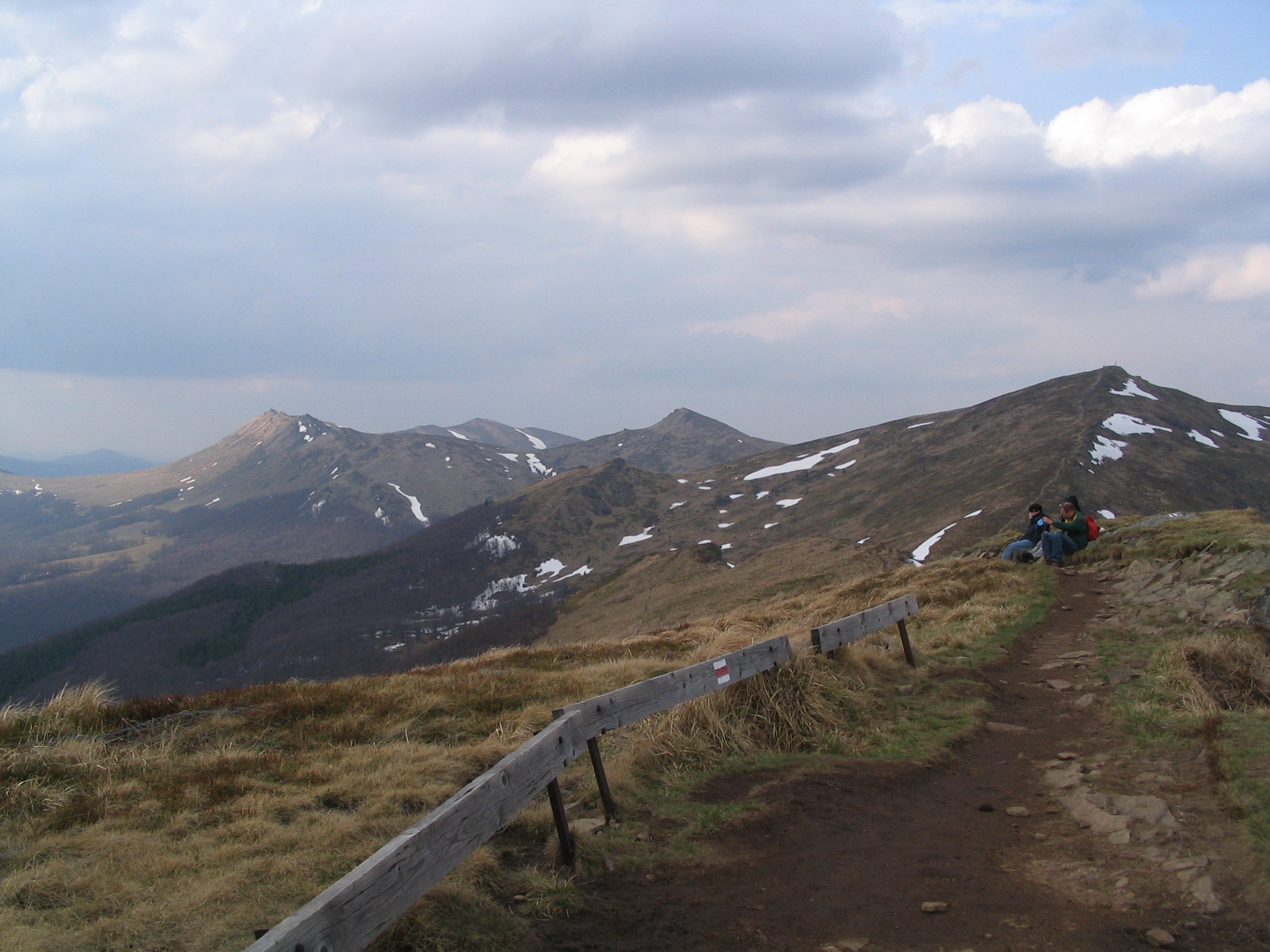
- Halicz (right) and Tarnica (left)

Highest point
- Elevation: 1,333 m (4,373 ft)
- Prominence: 103 m (338 ft)

Geography
- Location: Tarnawa Niżna, Podkarpackie Voivodeship, Poland
- Parent range: Bieszczady Mountains

Halicz is a peak in the Bieszczady Mountains in southern Poland. Its height is 1,333 meters.

It is one of the highest peaks in the mountain range and from its summit one can look out over the rest of the Bieszczady in both Poland and Ukraine.

== See also ==
- Bieszczady National Park
