= Sianki =

- Village
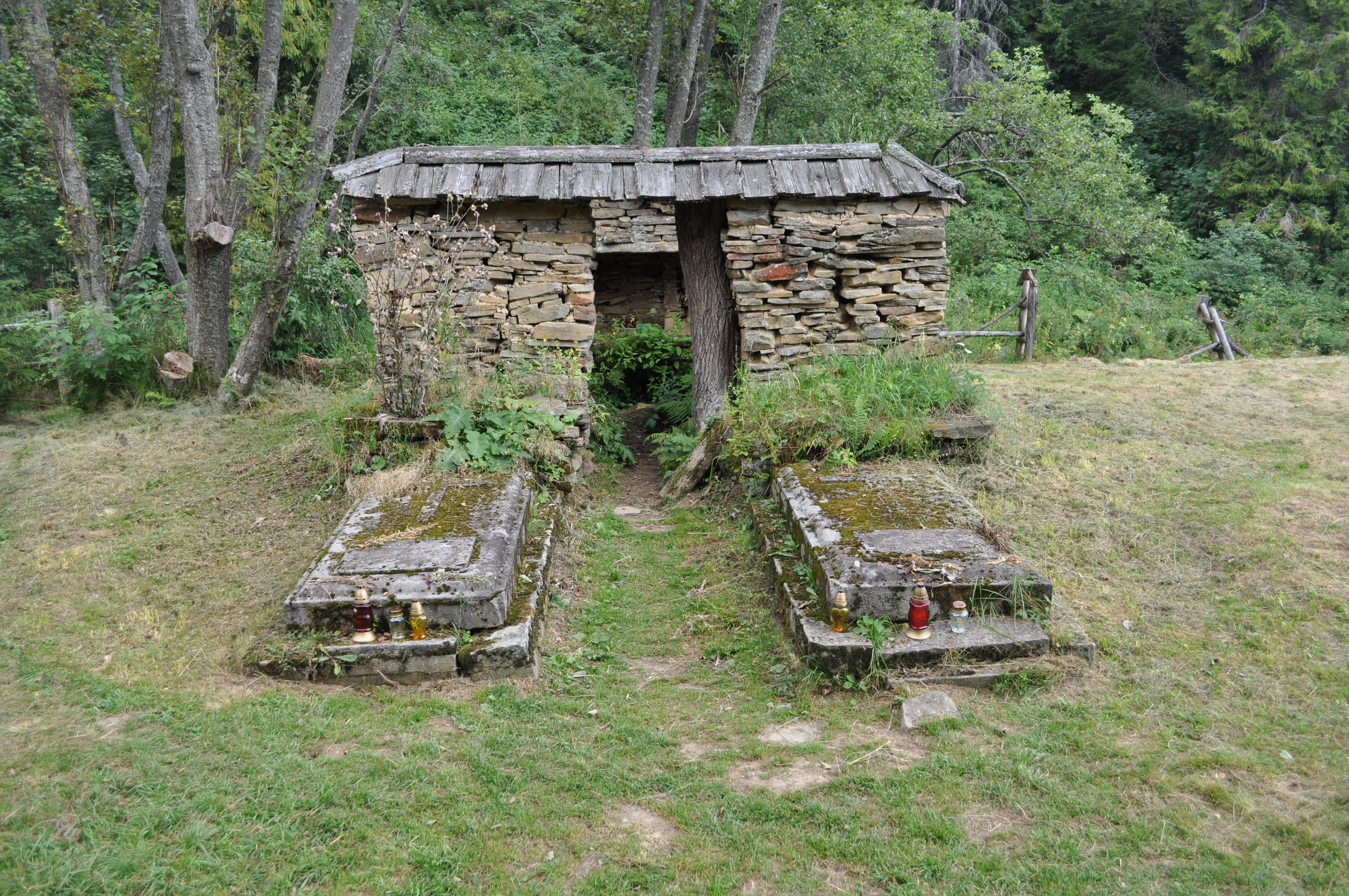
- Tombs of Franciszek and Klara Stroińscy in Sianki
- Interactive map of Sianki
- Location within Poland
- Coordinates: 49°1′9″N 22°53′23″E
- Country: Poland
- Voivodeship: Subcarpathian
- County: Bieszczady
- Gmina: Lutowiska
- Population: 0

Sianki [ˈɕaŋkʲi] is a former village in the administrative district of Gmina Lutowiska, within Bieszczady County, Subcarpathian Voivodeship, in south-eastern Poland, on the border with Ukraine.

On the Ukrainian side of the border there is a still extant part of the village (Sianky).
