= Sokoliki Górskie =

- Village
- Location within Poland
- Coordinates: 49°5′34″N 22°53′26″E
- Country: Poland
- Voivodeship: Subcarpathian
- County: Bieszczady
- Gmina: Lutowiska
- Elevation: 836 m (2,743 ft)
- Population: 0

Sokoliki Górskie [sɔkɔˈlʲikʲi ˈɡurskʲɛ] is a former village in the administrative district of Gmina Lutowiska, within Bieszczady County, Subcarpathian Voivodeship, in south-eastern Poland, close to the border with Ukraine.
