= Bereżki =

- Settlement
- Location within Poland
- Coordinates: 49°8′16″N 22°40′3″E
- Country: Poland
- Voivodeship: Subcarpathian
- County: Bieszczady
- Gmina: Lutowiska
- Population: 10

Bereżki [bɛˈrɛʂkʲi] is a settlement in the administrative district of Gmina Lutowiska, within Bieszczady County, Subcarpathian Voivodeship, in south-eastern Poland, close to the border with Ukraine.
