= Bieszczady National Park =

National park in Poland

- Bieszczadzki Park Narodowy
- IUCN category II (national park)
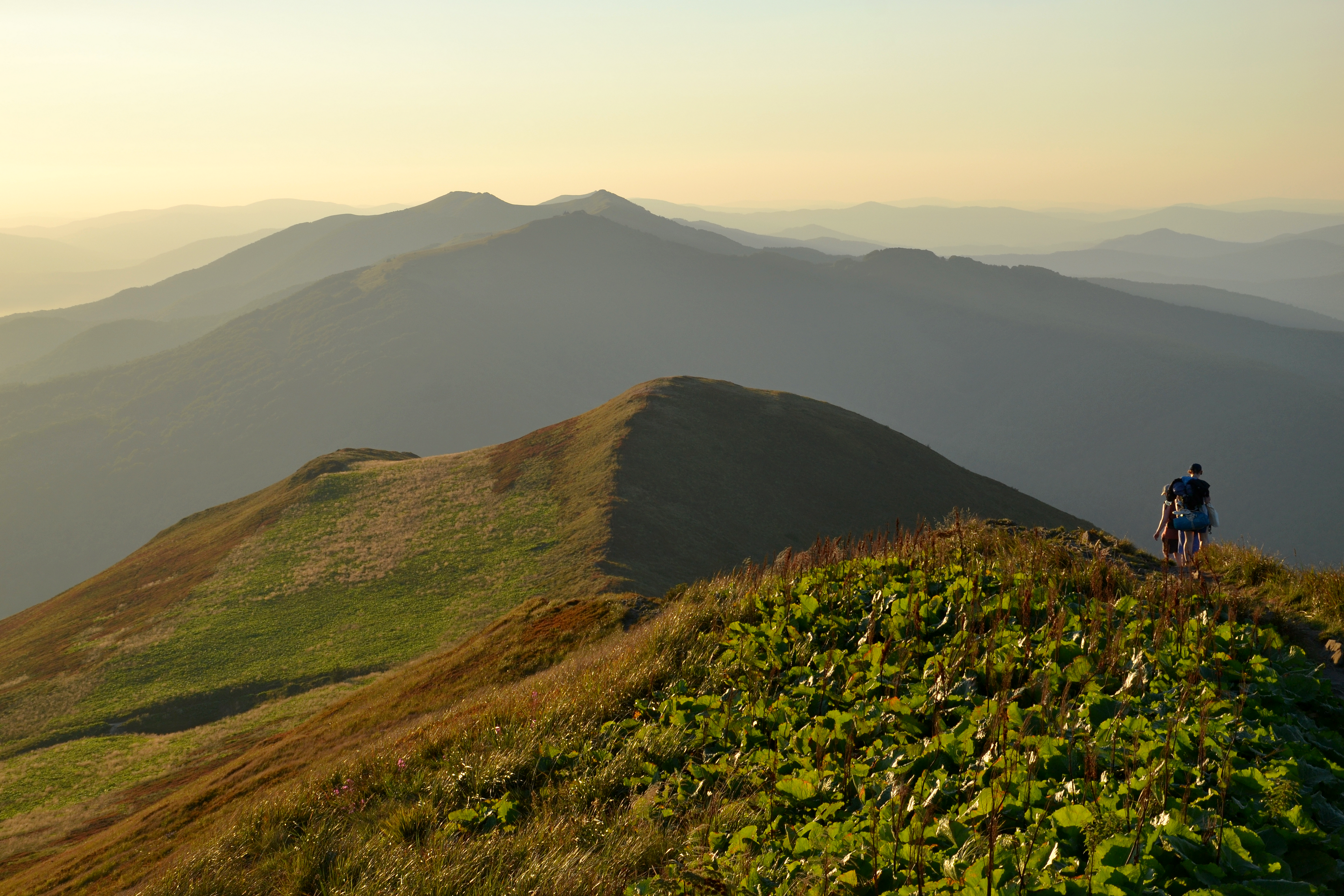
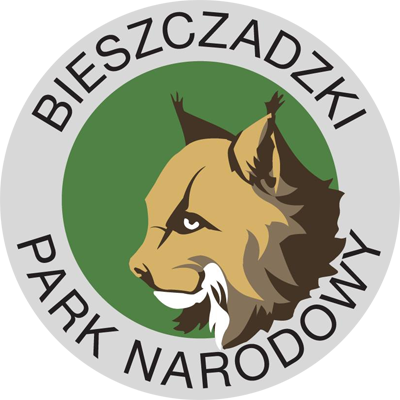
- Połonina Caryńska Park logo with a Eurasian lynx

- Location within Poland
- Location: Subcarpathian Voivodeship, Poland
- Coordinates: 49°17′17″N 22°29′49″E
- Area: 292.02 km^{2} (112.75 sq mi)
- Established: 1973
- Governing body: Ministry of the Environment
- Website: Official website

UNESCO World Heritage Site
- Part of: Ancient and Primeval Beech Forests of the Carpathians and Other Regions of Europe
- Criteria: Natural: ix
- Reference: 1133ter
- Inscription: 2007 (31st Session)
- Extensions: 2011, 2017, 2021

Bieszczady National Park ([bʲɛˈʂt͡ʂadɨ]; Polish: Bieszczadzki Park Narodowy) is the third-largest national park in Poland, located in Subcarpathian Voivodeship in the extreme southeast corner of the country. In 2021, the national park became a UNESCO World Heritage Site (as an extension to the Ancient and Primeval Beech Forests of the Carpathians and Other Regions of Europe).

== History ==
The park was created in 1973. At the time it covered only 59.55 square kilometres (22.99 sq mi), but over the years it was enlarged four times. The last enlargements took place in 1996 (when the park incorporated the former villages of Bukowiec, Beniowa and Carynskie) and in 1999 (when the former villages of Dzwiniacz, Tarnawa and Sokoliki were added).

It occupies 292.02 square kilometres (112.75 sq mi), covering the highest areas of the Polish part of the Bieszczady Mountains. In 1992 the park and its surrounding areas became part of the UNESCO East Carpathian Biosphere Reserve, which has a total area of 2,132.11 square kilometres (823.21 sq mi) and includes parts in Slovakia and (since 1998) Ukraine.

== Geography ==
Forests cover about 80% of Bieszczady National Park. The woods are mainly natural; in some cases they have preserved their pristine character. The highest peak in the park, Tarnica, is 1,346 metres (4,416 ft) above sea level.

== Fauna ==
Animal life is abundant with several species of endangered animals thriving in the area, among them brown bears, grey wolves, European wildcats, wild boars, Eurasian beavers, Eurasian otters, and Eurasian lynx as well as deer (such as moose) and European bison (over 500 live in the area). The park contains interesting bird species, including eagles and owls, and is home to the largest Polish population of Aesculapian snakes.

The park is sparsely populated (less than 1 person per km^{2}), which means that animals can roam freely. The region is very popular among tourists, but there are not many facilities. Around 70% of the park is regarded as strict preserve, which means that the use of trails is restricted. The park's authorities promote walking trips.

== Hiking trails ==
- European walking route E8
    - Prešov
    - Miháľov
    - Kurimka
    - Dukla
    - Iwonicz-Zdrój – Rymanów-Zdrój
    - Puławy
    - Tokarnia (778 m)
    - Kamień (717 m)
    - Komańcza
    - Cisna
    - Ustrzyki Górne
    - Tarnica
    - Wołosate
