= Dwernik =

- Village
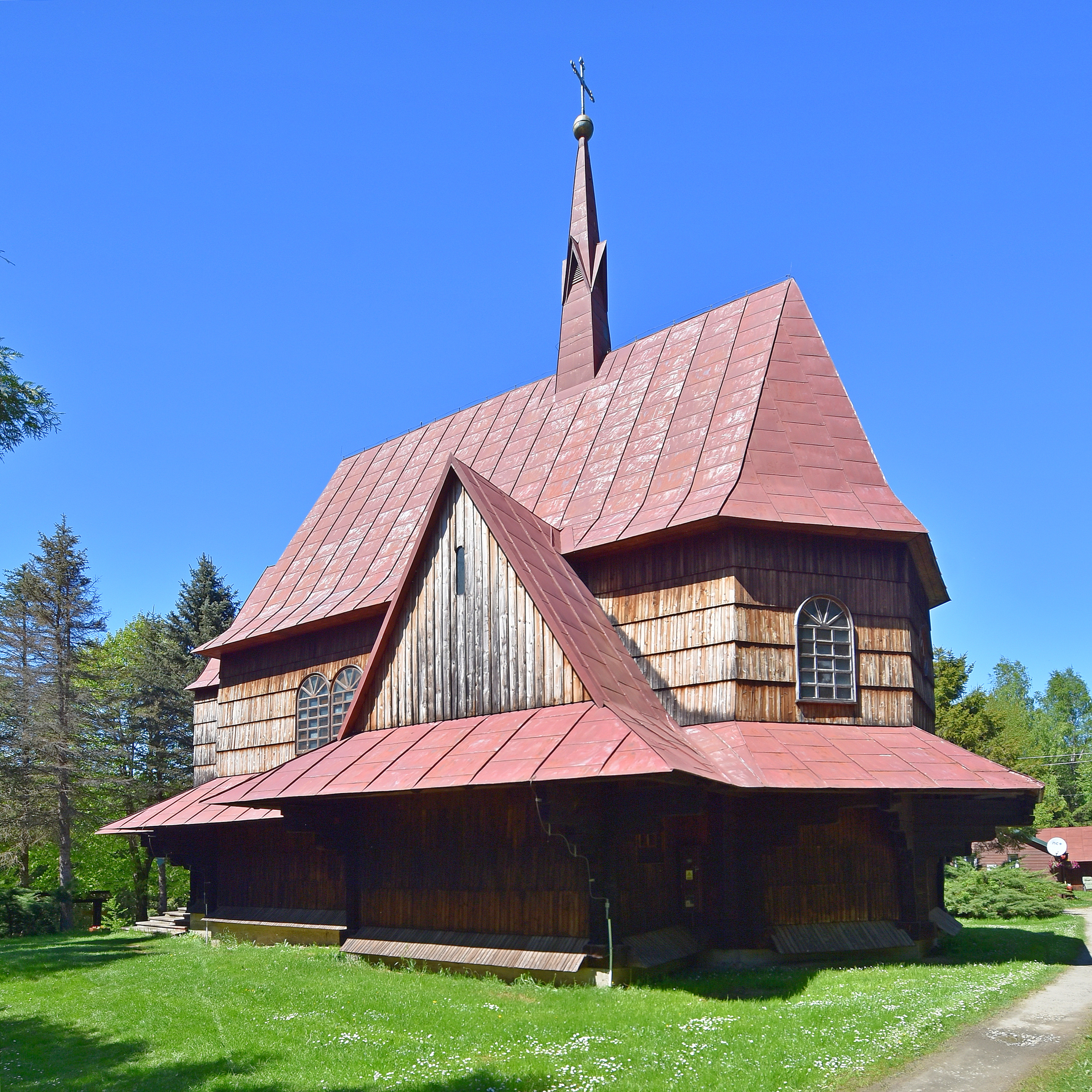
- Church of Archangel Saint Michael

- Location within Poland
- Coordinates: 49°12′28″N 22°37′32″E
- Country: Poland
- Voivodeship: Subcarpathian
- County: Bieszczady
- Gmina: Lutowiska

Population
  - Total: 160

Dwernik [ˈdvɛrɲik] is a village in the administrative district of Gmina Lutowiska, within Bieszczady County, Subcarpathian Voivodeship, in south-eastern Poland, close to the border with Ukraine.
