= Tarnawa Niżna =

- Village
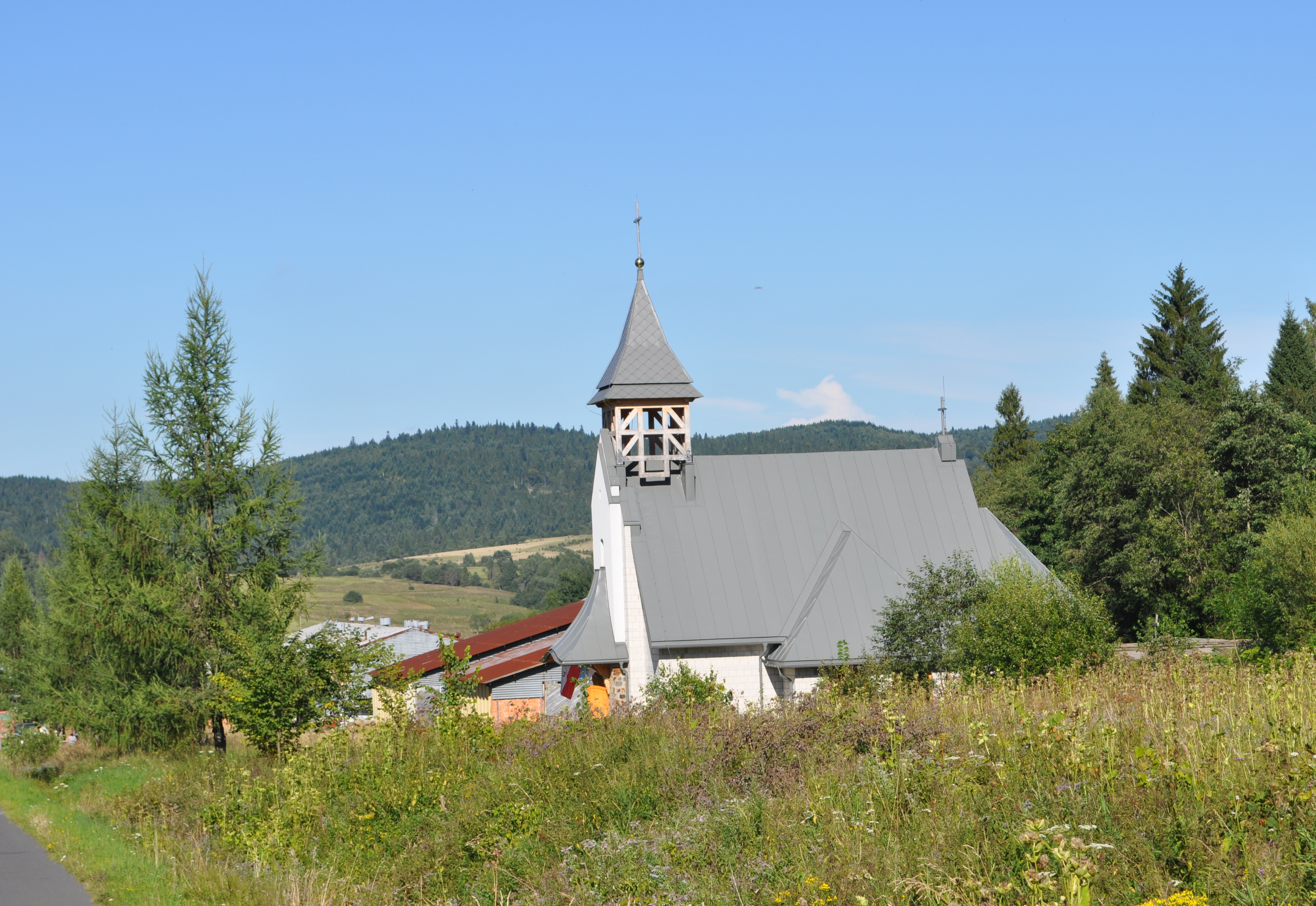
- Church in Tarnawa Niżna

- Location within Poland
- Coordinates: 49°7′33″N 22°47′40″E
- Country: Poland
- Voivodeship: Subcarpathian
- County: Bieszczady
- Gmina: Lutowiska
- Population: 40

Tarnawa Niżna [tarˈnava ˈɲiʐna] is a village in the administrative district of Gmina Lutowiska, within Bieszczady County, Subcarpathian Voivodeship, in south-eastern Poland, close to the border with Ukraine.
