= Gmina Lutowiska =

Gmina Lutowiska Lutowiska Commune
- Gmina
- Coat of arms
- Interactive map of Gmina Lutowiska
- Coordinates (Lutowiska): 49°15′4″N 22°41′45″E
- Country: Poland
- Voivodeship: Subcarpathian
- County: Bieszczady
- Seat: Lutowiska

Area
  - Total: 475.85 km^{2} (183.73 sq mi)

Population (2006)
  - Total: 2,197
  - Density: 4.617/km^{2} (11.96/sq mi)
- Website: http://www.lutowiska.pl/

Gmina Lutowiska is a rural gmina (administrative district) in Bieszczady County, Subcarpathian Voivodeship, in south-eastern Poland, on the border with Ukraine. Its seat is the village of Lutowiska, which lies approximately 22 kilometres (14 mi) south of Ustrzyki Dolne and 101 km (63 mi) south-east of the regional capital Rzeszów.

The gmina covers an area of 475.85 square kilometres (183.7 sq mi), and as of 2006 its total population is 2,197.

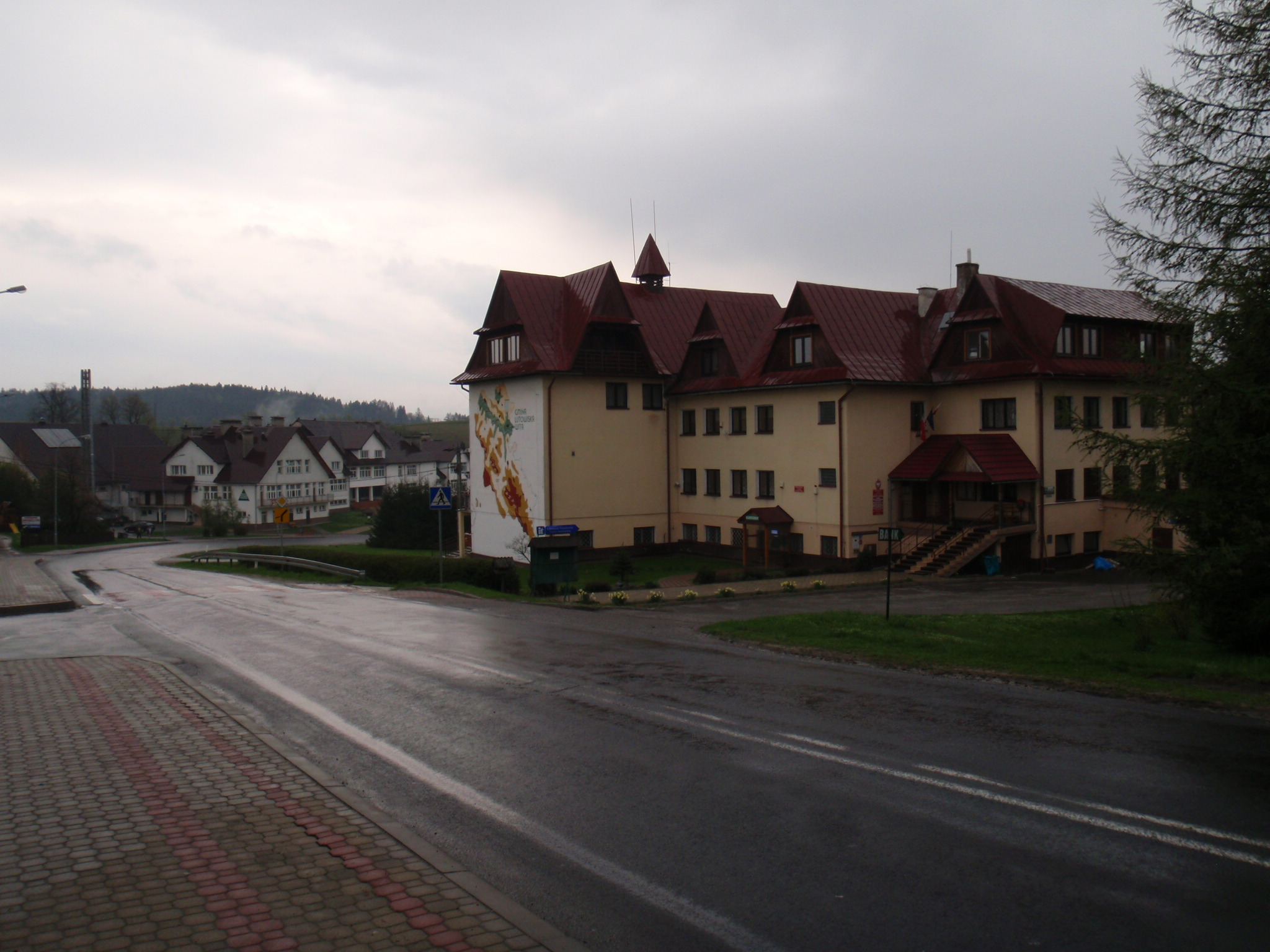

The gmina contains part of the protected area called San Valley Landscape Park.

== Villages ==
Gmina Lutowiska contains the villages, settlements and former villages of Beniowa, Bereżki, Brzegi Górne, Bukowiec, Caryńskie, Chmiel, Dwerniczek, Dwernik, Dydiowa, Dźwiniacz Górny, Hulskie, Krywe, Krywka, Łokieć, Lutowiska, Muczne, Nasiczne, Procisne, Pszczeliny, Sianki, Skorodne, Smolnik, Sokoliki Górskie, Stuposiany, Tarnawa Niżna, Tarnawa Wyżna, Ustrzyki Górne, Wołosate, Zatwarnica and Żurawin.

== Neighbouring gminas ==
Gmina Lutowiska is bordered by the gminas of Cisna and Czarna. It also borders Ukraine.
