= Pszczeliny =

- Village
- Location within Poland
- Coordinates: 49°9′59″N 22°41′28″E
- Country: Poland
- Voivodeship: Subcarpathian
- County: Bieszczady
- Gmina: Lutowiska
- Population: 153

Pszczeliny [pʂt͡ʂɛˈlʲinɨ] is a village in the administrative district of Gmina Lutowiska, within Bieszczady County, Subcarpathian Voivodeship, in south-eastern Poland, close to the border with Ukraine.
