= Stuposiany =

- Village
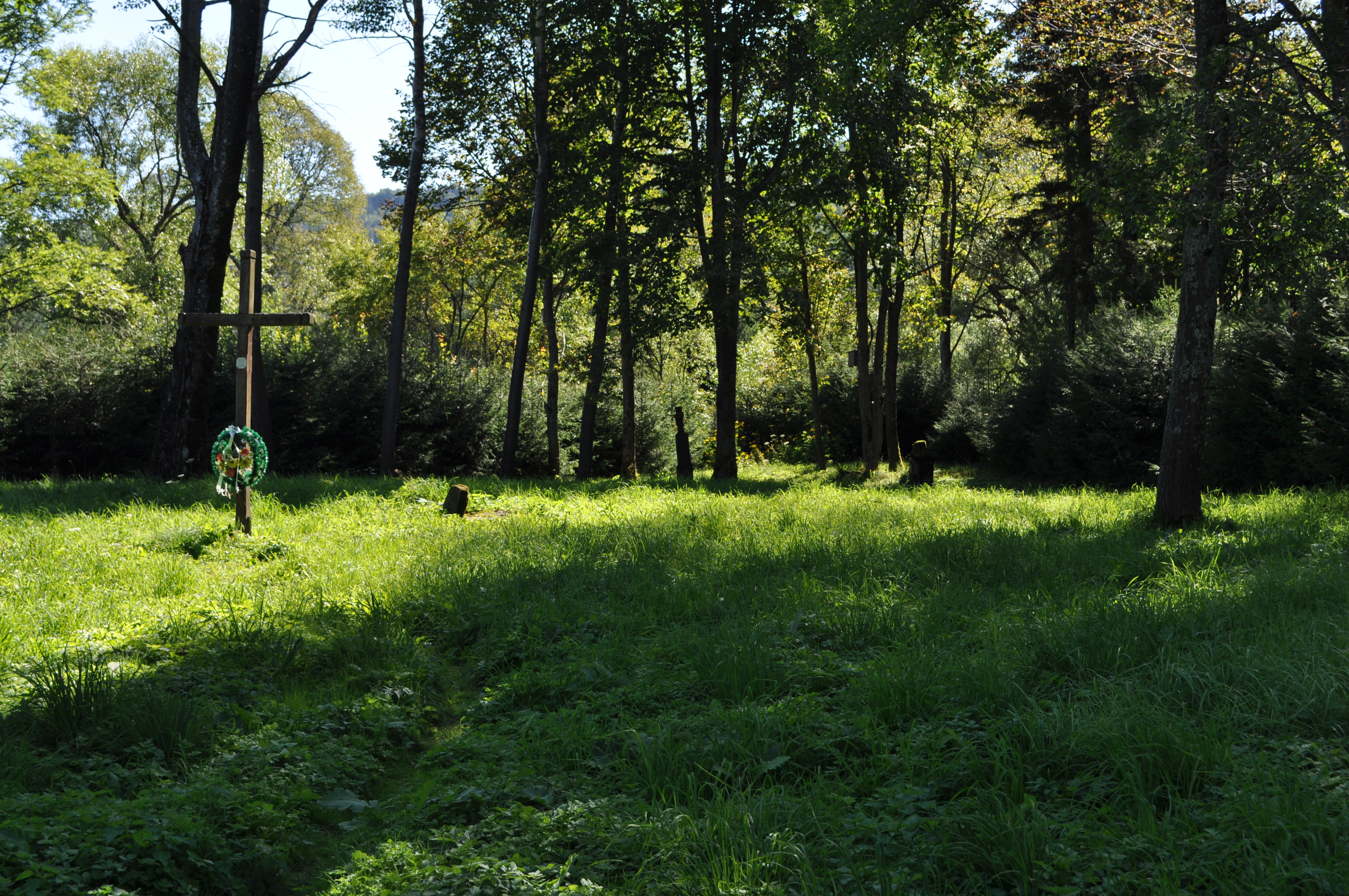
- Cemetery in Stupiosiany

- Location within Poland
- Coordinates: 49°11′21″N 22°40′56″E
- Country: Poland
- Voivodeship: Subcarpathian
- County: Bieszczady
- Gmina: Lutowiska
- Population: 120

Stuposiany [stupɔˈɕanɨ] is a village in the administrative district of Gmina Lutowiska, within Bieszczady County, Subcarpathian Voivodeship, in south-eastern Poland, close to the border with Ukraine.
