= Low Beskids =

Mountain range in Poland and Slovakia

Low Beskids / Central Beskids
- Slovak: Nízke Beskydy Polish: Beskidy Środkowe
- Low Beskids / Central Beskids, marked in red and labeled with B

Highest point
- Peak: Busov (Slovakia)
- Elevation: 1,002 m (3,287 ft)
- Coordinates: 49°29′00″N 22°40′04″E

Dimensions
- Length: 120 km (75 mi) west-east
- Width: 50–70 km (31–43 mi) north-south
- Area: 7,000 km^{2} (2,700 mi^{2})

Geography
- Countries: Slovakia and Poland
- Parent range: Outer Eastern Carpathians
- Borders on: Doły Jasielsko Sanockie, Bieszczady Mountains, Pogórze Bukowskie, Bukovské vrchy, Vihorlat Mountains, Eastern Slovak Lowland, Slanské vrchy, Čergov and Ľubovnianska vrchovina

Geology
- Rock types: granite, gneiss and limestone

The Low Beskids (Slovak: Nízke Beskydy) or Central Beskids (Polish: Beskidy Środkowe; Czech: Centrální Beskydy; Ukrainian: Центральні Бескиди) are a mountain range in southeastern Poland and northeastern Slovakia. They constitute a middle (central) section of the Beskids, within the Outer Eastern Carpathians.

Since there are several traditional divisions of the Beskid Mountains in general, this particular region has also been classified by different designations. In Slovak terminology, the region is called Low Beskids (Slovak: Nízke Beskydy). In Polish terminology, the same region is not classified under the term Low Beskids (Polish: Beskid Niski), since that term is used to designate only one part of the region, while the Polish equivalent term for the entire region is Central Beskids (Polish: Beskidy Środkowe).

It is a hilly region, encompassing the Prešov Region, Sanok County and Jasło County, and covering the area between Busov, Ondavská vrchovina, Laborecká vrchovina, Beskydské predhorie in Slovakia, and Beskid Sądecki, Pogórze Bukowskie and Bieszczady near the river Wisłoka, Wisłok and Osława in Poland. The mountain range has two summits, one of 1,002 (Busov), and one of 997 metres (Lackowa). The Low Beskids separate the Bieszczady Mountains from the Western Carpathians.

Original flora and fauna of the region were preserved because of the area's remoteness. The mountain range is covered with beech forests. The area is protected by Magurski National Park and Jaśliski Park Krajobrazowy. Animals living in this reserve are, amongst others, black storks, deer and wolves.

== Subdivisions ==
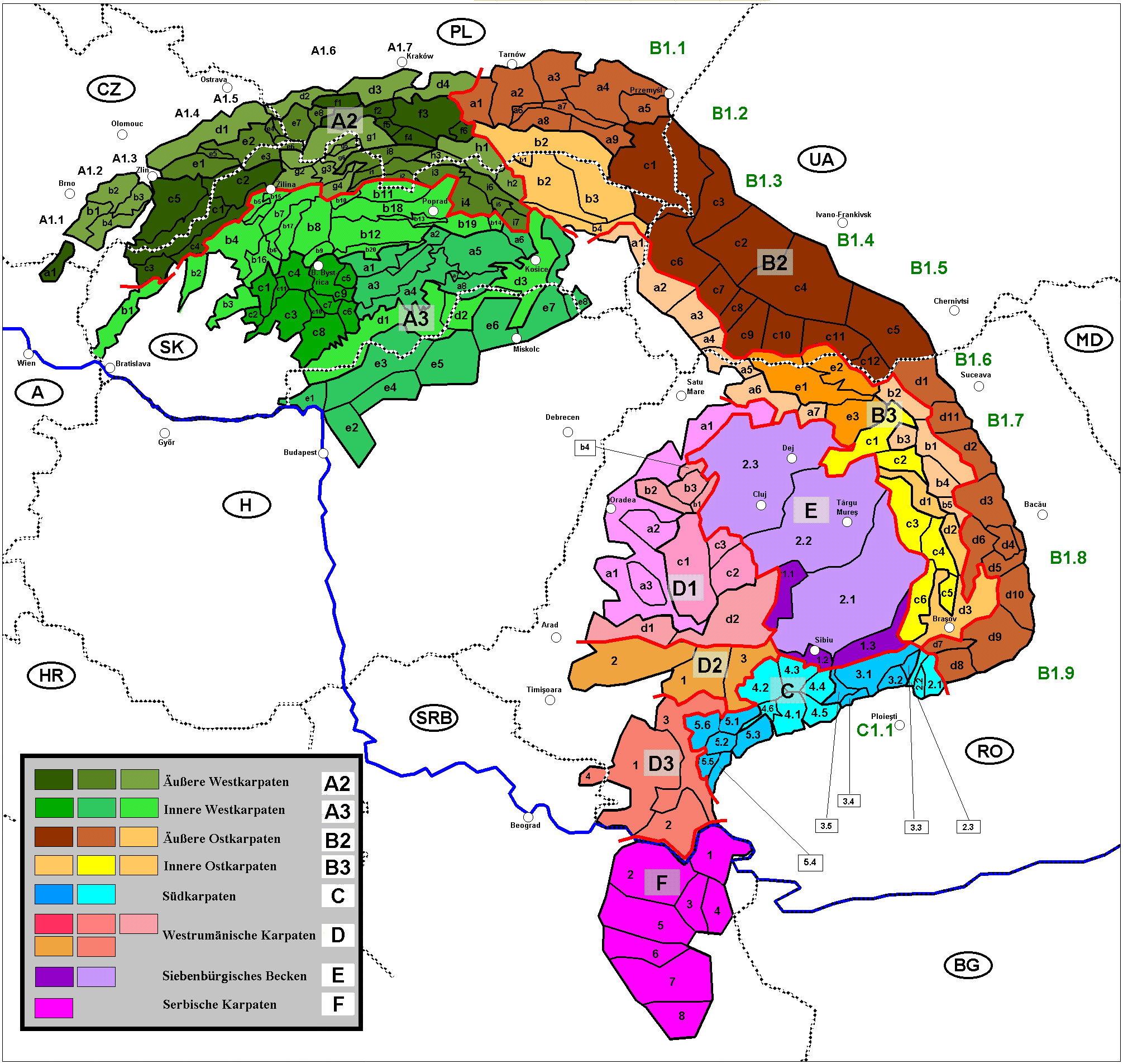
The Low Beskids / Central Beskids (b1+b2+b3+b4) within Carpathians

Since there exist many variants of divisions of the mountain ranges and names for the Beskids, several divisions are given in the following:

- Low Beskid (Polish: Beskid Niski) in Poland + Laborec Highlands (SK: Laborecká vrchovina) in Slovakia
- Busov (SK: Busov) in Slovakia
- Ondavská Highlands (SK: Ondavská vrchovina) in Slovakia
- Beskidian Southern Foothills (SK: Beskydské predhorie) in Slovakia

Among mountains of this regions, most prominent are:

- Góry Grybowskie – near rivers Kamienica and Biała (Poland),
- Góry Hańczowskie – near rivers Biała, Ropa and Zdynia (Poland),
- Beskid Gorlicki – near river Biała, villages: Radocyna, Bartne, Wołowiec,
- Pasmo Magurskie – mountains ranges Magura Wątkowska and Małastowskie,
- Beskid Dukielski – between rivers Wisłoka and Tabor (Poland),
- Gniazdo Jawornika – between rivers Jasiołki i Wisłoka (Poland),
- Pasmo Bukowicy and Kamieni Peak – between rivers Wisłok and Osławica,
- Pasmo graniczne – near river Bełcza (Poland),
- Wzgórza Rymanowskie – near river Tabor (Poland),

== History ==
=== Poland ===
The region was a site of contention between Poland, Kievan Rus, and Hungary, starting in at least the 9th century. The population was primarily Slavic but with contentions over nationality. Germans and town dwelling Lemkos were Polonized and the countryside remained primarily Lemko/Ukrainian.

Up until 1947, the majority of the population was Lemko (Rusin). The Lemkos are sometimes considered the westernmost of the Ukraininans. They were forcibly removed in a Polonization plan agreed between the Soviet Union and the Polish communist government. Many were killed or forcibly sent to Soviet Ukraine. Those not sent to Ukraine were dispersed among towns and villages in the new western Polish territory taken from Germany.

=== Slovakia ===
The Low Beskids on the territory of present-day Slovakia has attracted settlers since the Stone Age. The Slavic forefathers of the Slovaks gradually moved to the basin of Humenné and Bardejov during the great migration of peoples, starting in the 5th century. An intensive and organized settlement of this area started as late as in the middle of the 13th century, after the Mongol raids. However, the first written reference to the town dates back to the 1240s, when monks from Bardejov complained to the King Béla IV about a violation of the town's borders by Prešov.

== Rural landscape pictures ==
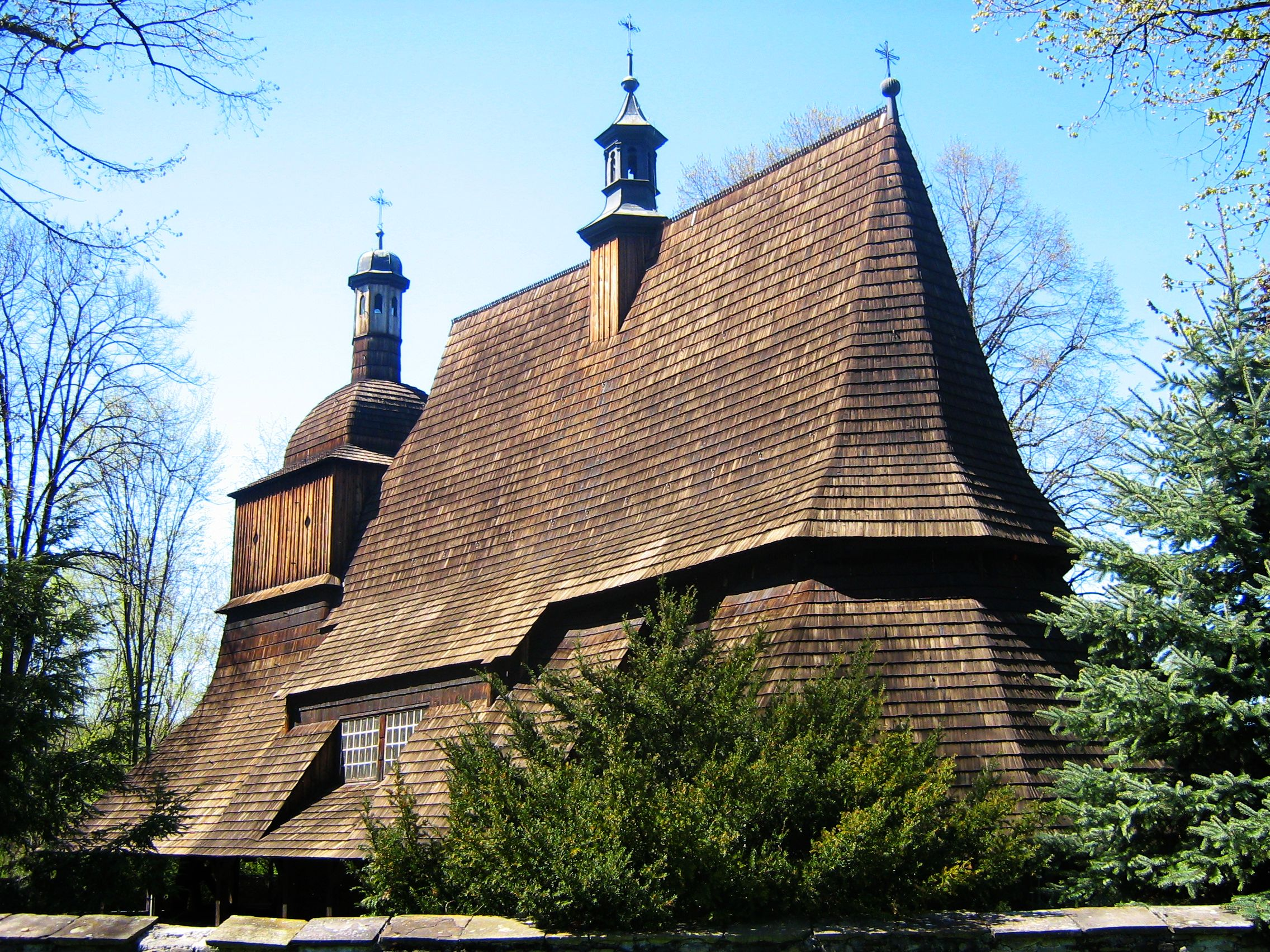

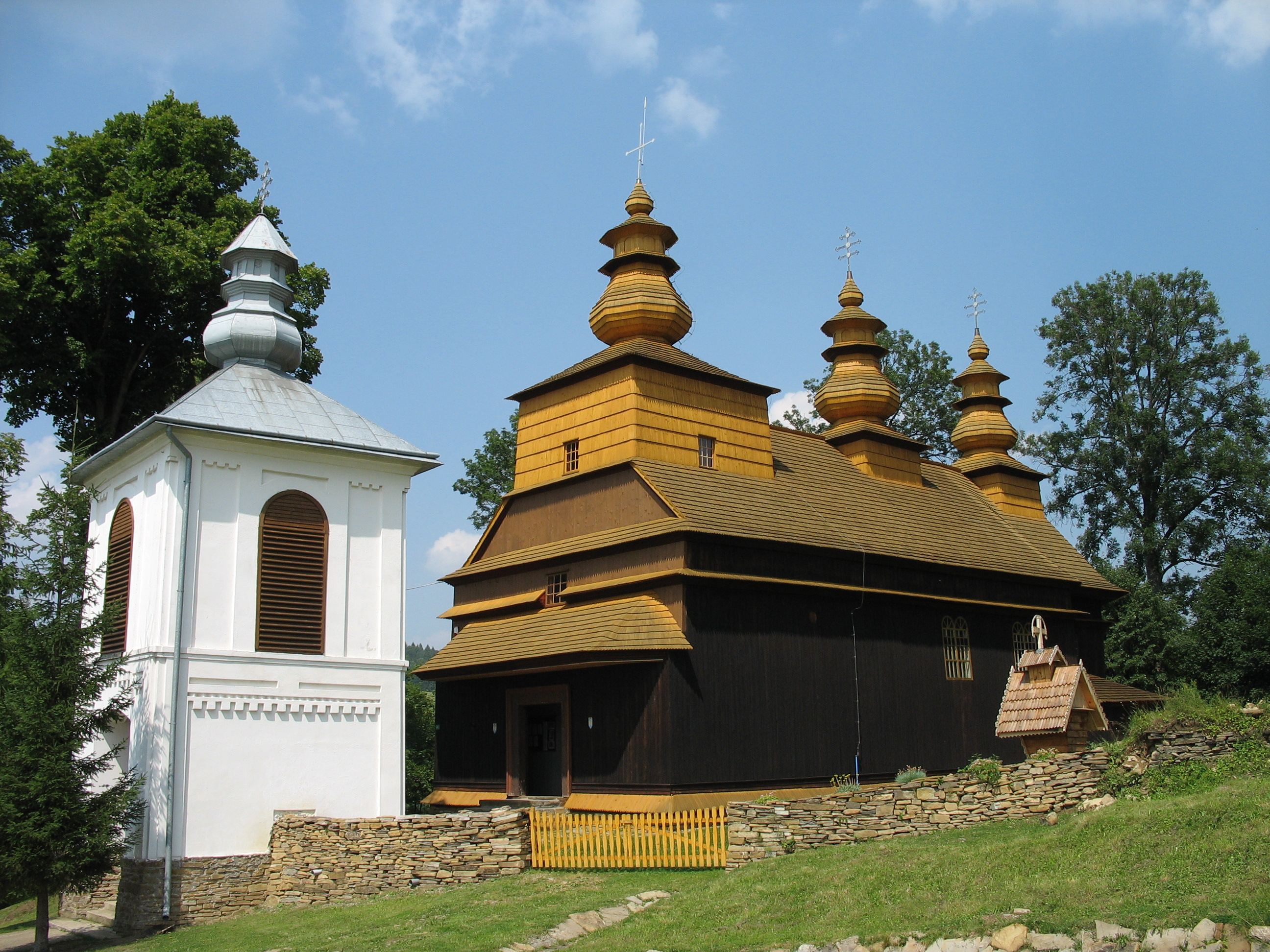

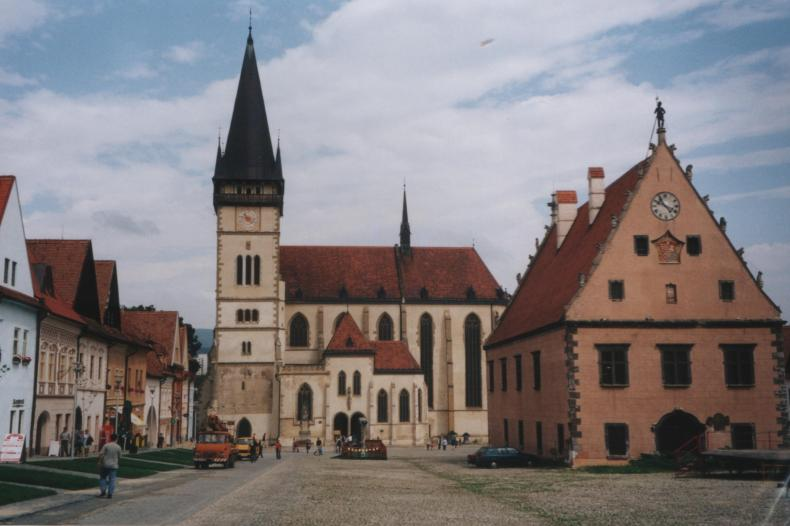

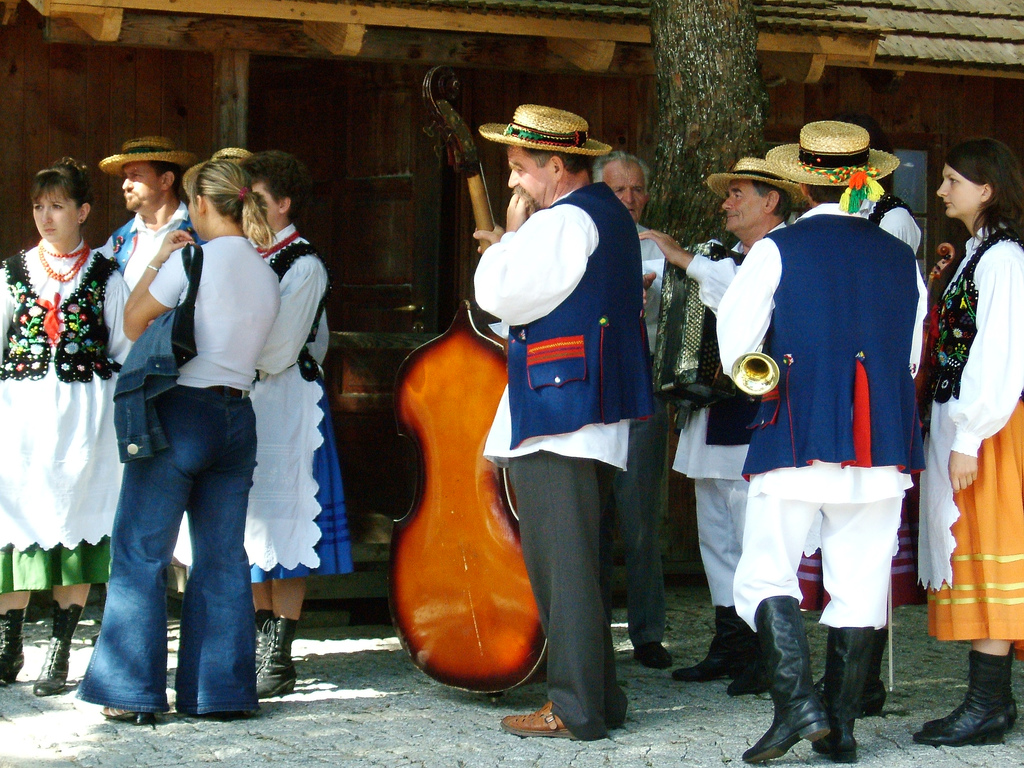

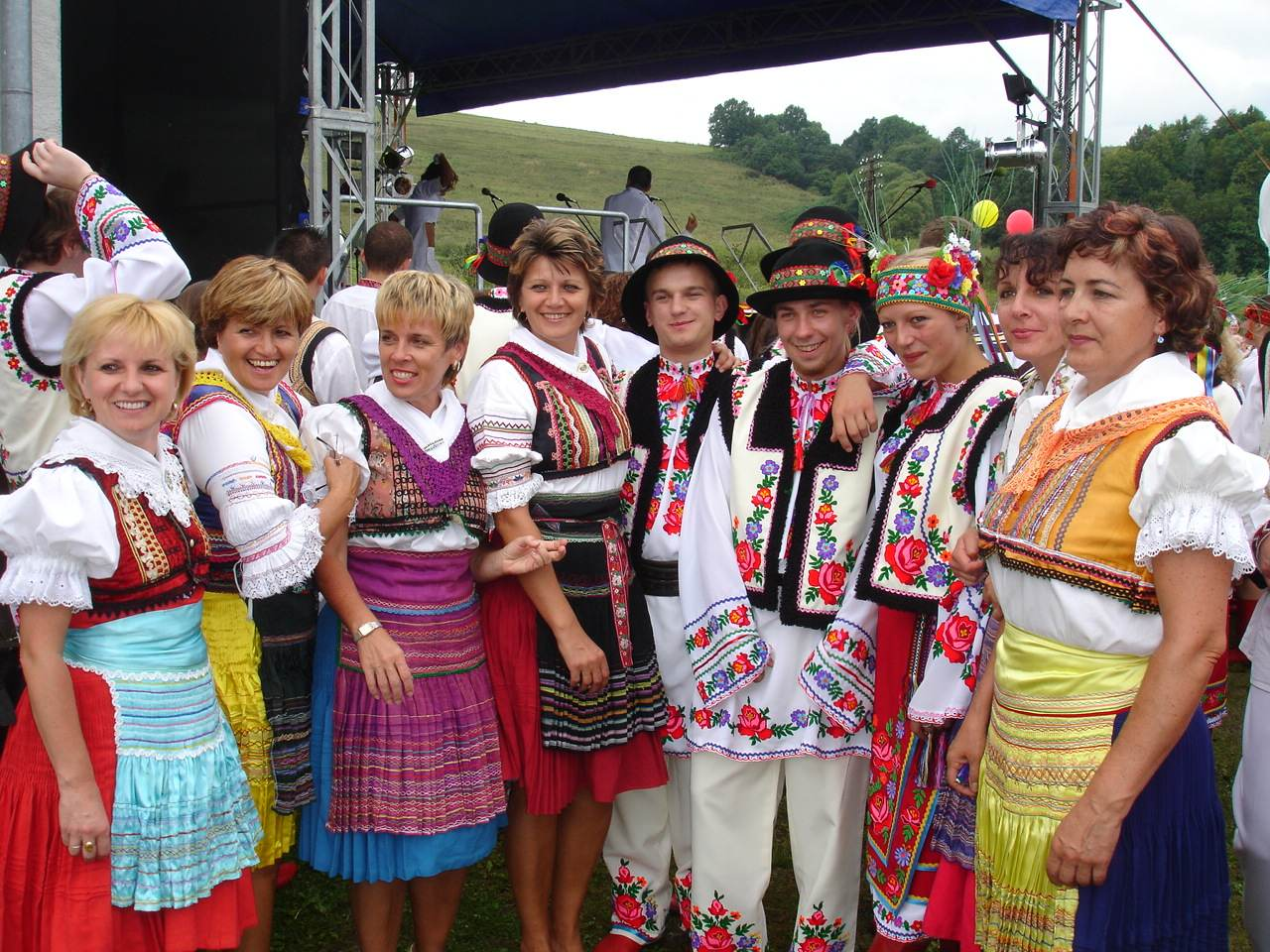

== Towns and villages ==
Important towns and villages of this region include:

- Bardejov
- Humenné
- Svidník
- Medzilaborce
- Stropkov
- Giraltovce
- Bukowsko
- Grybów
- Gorlice
- Iwonicz Zdrój
- Rymanów-Zdrój
- Dukla
- Rymanów
- Nowy Żmigród

== Ethnic groups ==
- Carpathian Germans
- Slovaks
- Poles including Polish Uplanders
- Rusyns including Lemkos

== Hiking trails ==
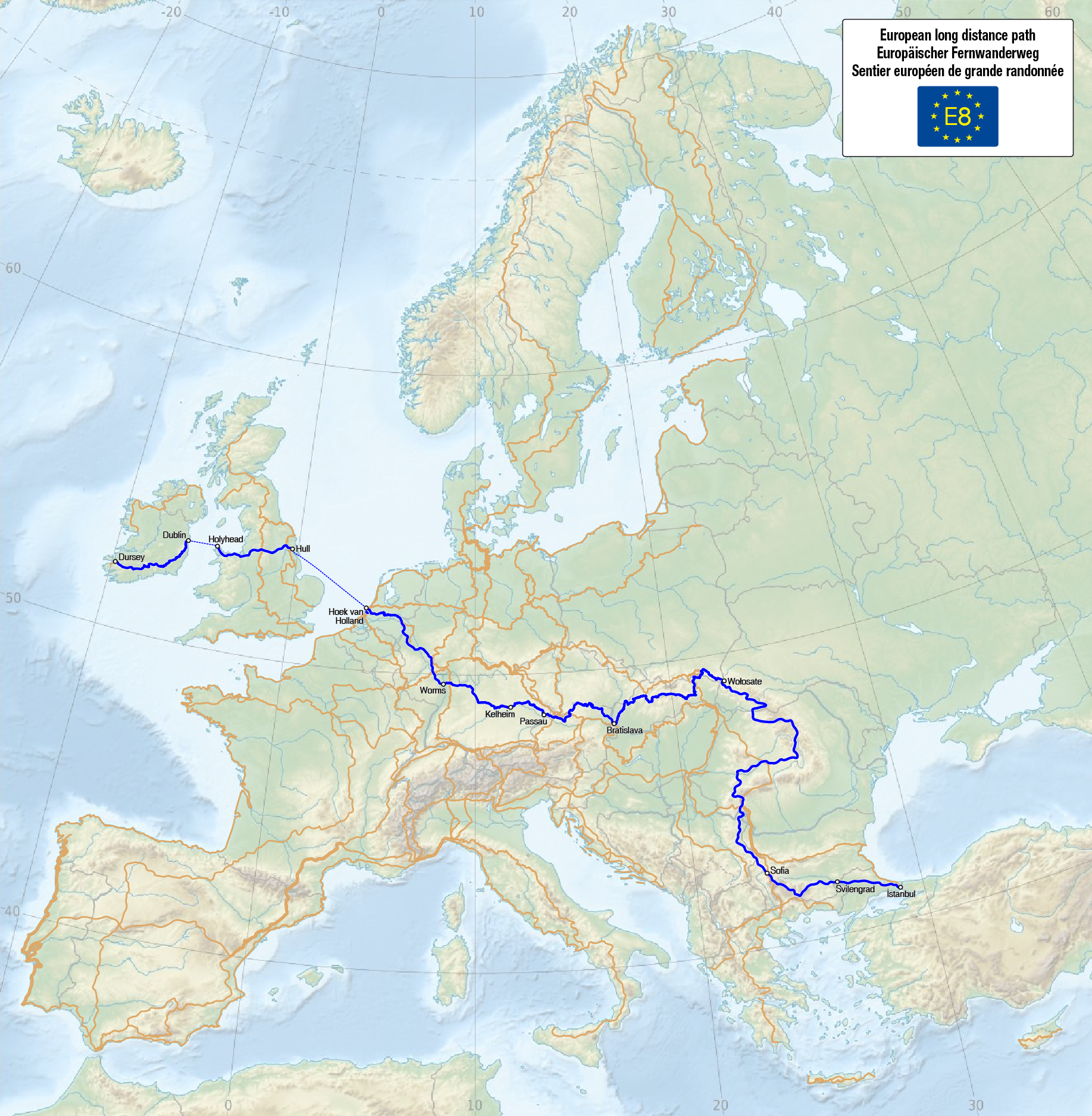
The European walking route E8

European walking route E8:

- Somár – sedlo Baba – Dolná Rakova – Končini – Brezová pod Bradlom – Polianka – Myjava – Veľká Javorina – Nové Mesto nad Váhom – Machnáč – Trenčín – Košecké Rovné – Fačkovské sedlo – Kunešov – Kraľová studňa – Donovaly – Chopok – Čertovica – Telgárt – Skalisko – Štós-kúpele – Skalisko – Chata Lajoška – Košice – Malý Šariš – Prešov – Miháľov – Kurimka – Dukla – Iwonicz-Zdrój – Rymanów-Zdrój – Puławy – Tokarnia (778 m) – Kamień (717 m) – Komańcza – Cisna – Ustrzyki Górne -Tarnica – Wołosate.

== See also ==
- Central Beskidian Foothills
- Divisions of the Carpathians
- Outer Eastern Carpathians
- Eastern Beskids

== Literature ==
- Földvary, Gábor Z. (1988). Geology of the Carpathian Region. Singapore: World Scientific Publishing Company. ISBN 9789813103825.
- Kondracki, Jerzy (1977). Regiony fizycznogeograficzne Polski. Warszawa: Wydawa Uniwersytetu Warszawskiego.
- Kondracki, Jerzy (1989). Problemy standaryzacji nazw geograficznych. Warszawa: Instytut Geografii i Przestrzennego Zagospodarowania PWN.
- Kondracki, Jerzy (2000) [1998]. Geografia regionalna Polski (2. ed.). Warszawa: Wydawnictwo Naukowe PWN. ISBN 9788301130503.
- Jadwiga Warszyńska. Karpaty Polskie : przyroda, człowiek i jego działalność; Uniwersytet Jagielloński. Kraków, 1995.
