= Bukowica Range =

Mountain range in Poland

- Bukowica
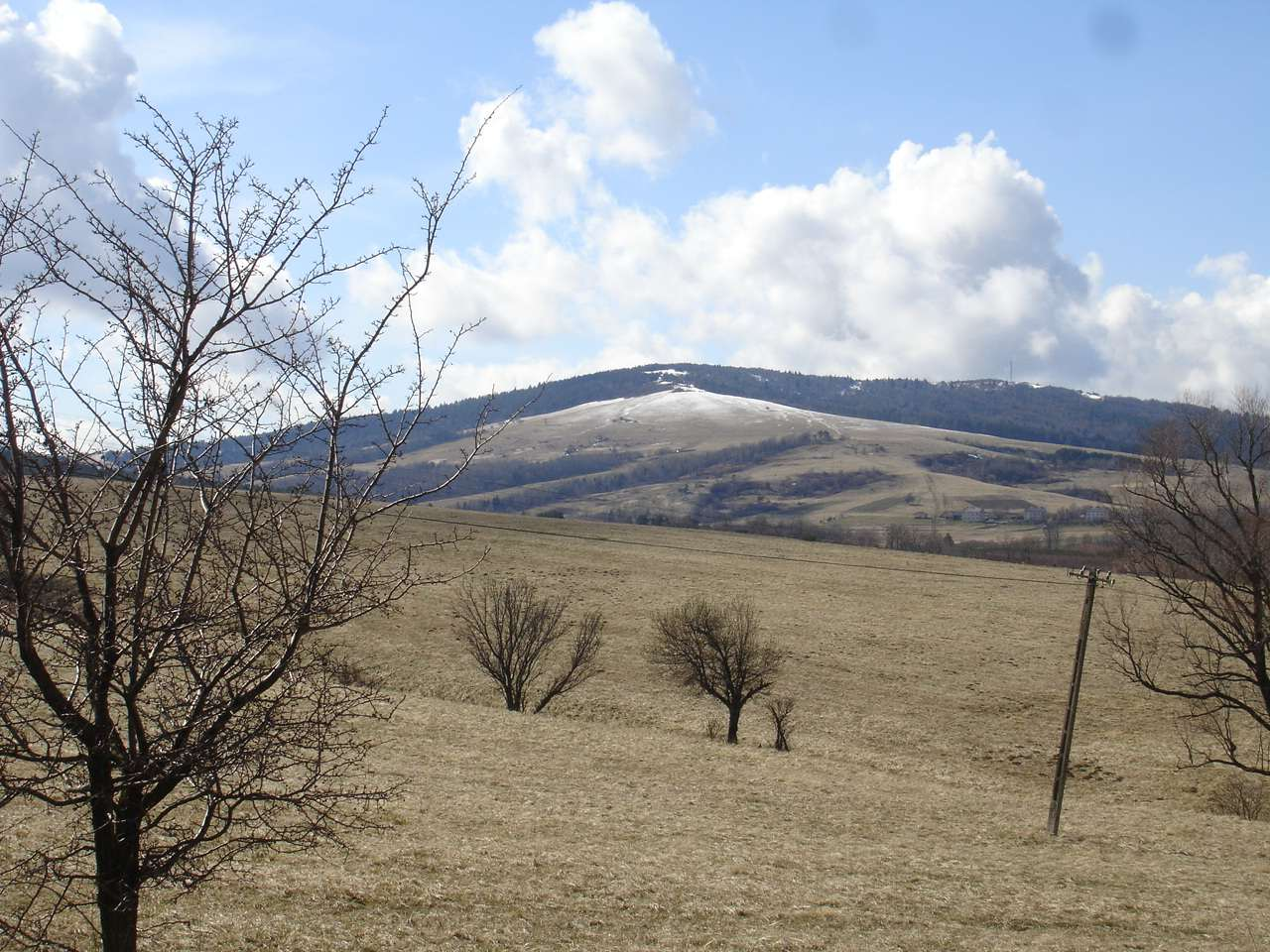
- Southern summit

Highest point
- Peak: Tokarnia
- Elevation: 778 m (2,552 ft)
- Listing: Mountains of Poland
- Coordinates: 49°27′46″N 22°04′17″E

Naming
- Etymology: Its name comes from the west slavic dialect word buk, meaning "beech" (beeches range)
- Nickname: Bukowica
- Native name: Pasmo Bukowicy (Polish)

Geography
- Location within Poland
- Country: Poland
- Region: Podkarpacie
- District: Sanok County
- Parent range: Low Beskids - Pogórze Bukowskie

Climbing
- Access: hike

Bukowica Range (Pasmo Bukowicy in Polish) part of the Pogórze Bukowskie and Low Beskids in southern Poland. The Bukowica created by the long mountain massif, situated in the eastern part of the Beskid Niski between the valleys of the Wisłok and Osławica rivers. The Bukowica Range separating the west Low Beskids from the east Pogórze Bukowskie.

It consists of a larger ridge of Bukowica with summits as Skibce (776 m. above the sea level ) in the north-west and Tokarnia (777 m. above the sea level ) in the south-east and the smaller range of Kamien Peak (718 m. above the sea level ). Bukowica is rather a monotonous mountainous bank and is heavily except Tokarnia covered with forest it has a panoramic view in all directions. The southern part is a steep rocky wall, while the other side consist of less steep rocky fields.

The Bukowica Range separates the west Low Beskids from the east Pogórze Bukowskie.

== Division ==
- Tokarnia Peak (778 m. high, above the sea level),
- Zrubań Peak (778 m.),
- Kamień Peak (717 m.),
- Kiczera Peak (640 m.)

== Hiking trails ==
- European walking route E8
  - Iwonicz-Zdrój – Rymanów-Zdrój - Puławy – Tokarnia (778 m) – Przybyszów – Kamień (717 m) – Komańcza (Główny Szlak Beskidzki)
  - Pasmo Bukowicy - Kanasiówka (823 m) – Wisłok Wielki – Tokarnia (778 m), 1 km – Wola Piotrowa - Komańcza - Cisna - Tarnica - Wołosate.

== See also ==
- Bieszczady National Park
