= Kurimka =

Village in Slovakia

- Municipality
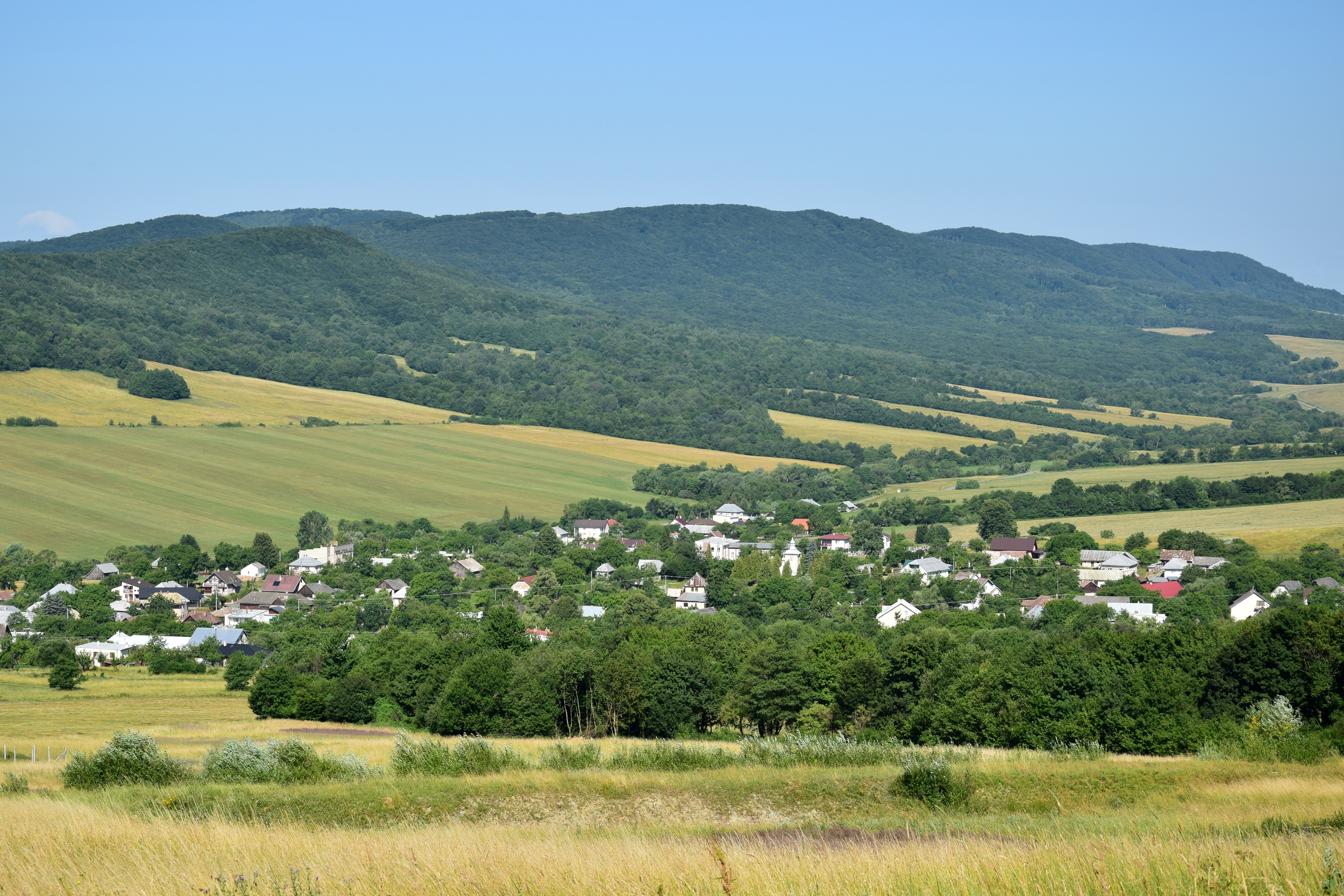

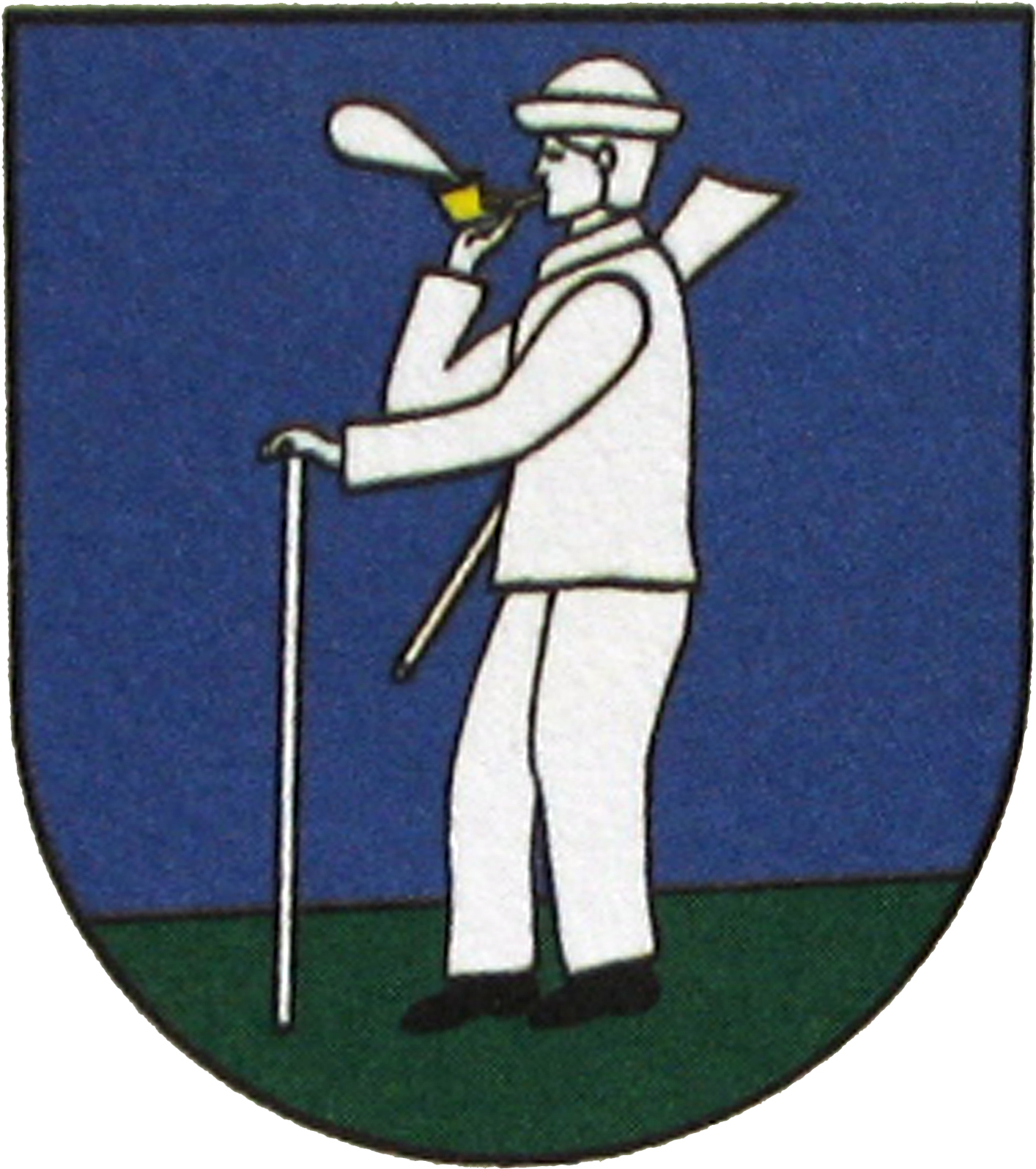
- Flag Coat of arms

- Location of Kurimka in the Prešov Region Location of Kurimka in Slovakia
- Coordinates: 49.32°N 21.45°E
- Country: Slovakia
- Region: Prešov Region
- District: Svidník District
- First mentioned: 1548

Area
  - Total: 12.45 km^{2} (4.81 sq mi)
- Elevation: 321 m (1,053 ft)

Population (2025)
  - Total: 371
- Time zone: UTC+1 (CET)
  - Summer (DST): UTC+2 (CEST)
- Postal code: 901 6
- Area code: +421 54
- Vehicle registration plate (until 2022): SK
- Website: www.kurimka.sk

Kurimka (Rusyn: Куримка; Hungarian: Kiskurima, until 1899: Kurimka) is a village and municipality in Svidník District in the Prešov Region of north-eastern Slovakia.

== History ==
In historical records the village was first mentioned in 1548.

== Geography ==
The municipality lies at an altitude of 321 metres (1,053 ft) and covers an area of 12.45 km^{2} (4.81 sq mi) (2025).

=== Hiking trails ===
- European walking route E8
  - Prešov – Miháľov – Kurimka – Dukla – Iwonicz-Zdrój – Rymanów-Zdrój – Puławy – Tokarnia (778 m) – Kamień (717 m) – Komańcza – Cisna – Ustrzyki Górne – Tarnica – Wołosate.

== Population ==
Population statistic (10 years)
Year	1995	2005	2015	2025
Count	396	374	381	371
Difference		−5.55%	+1.87%	−2.62%

Population statistic
Year	2024	2025
Count	362	371
Difference		+2.48%

It has a population of 371 people (31 December 2025).

=== Ethnicity ===
Census 2021 (1+ %)
Ethnicity	Number	Fraction
Slovak	296	76.68%
Rusyn	194	50.25%
Romani	36	9.32%
Ukrainian	13	3.36%
Not found out	7	1.81%
Total	386	

In year 2021 was 386 people by ethnicity 296 as Slovak, 194 as Rusyn, 36 as Romani, 13 as Ukrainian, 7 as Not found out, 2 as Polish and 1 as Czech.

Note on population: The difference values of population numbers in the table "Population statistic" and in the sections "Ethnicity" & "Religion" is caused by the use of various statistical methods.

=== Religion ===
Census 2021 (1+ %)
Religion	Number	Fraction
Greek Catholic Church	274	70.98%
Roman Catholic Church	30	7.77%
Eastern Orthodox Church	28	7.25%
Jehovah's Witnesses	23	5.96%
None	19	4.92%
Not found out	5	1.3%
Evangelical Church	4	1.04%
Total	386	

In year 2021 was 386 people by religion 274 from Greek Catholic Church, 30 from Roman Catholic Church, 28 from Eastern Orthodox Church, 23 from Jehovah's Witnesses, 19 from None, 5 from Not found out, 4 from Evangelical Church and 3 from Other.
