= Tarnica =

Mountain peak in Poland

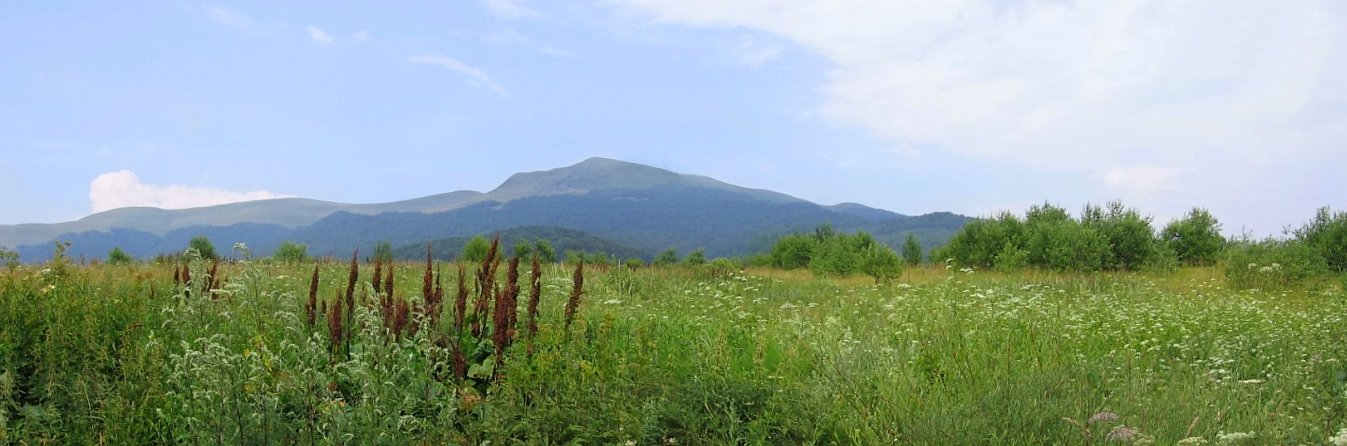
- Northern summit

Highest point
- Elevation: 1,346 m (4,416 ft)
- Coordinates: 49°04′10″N 22°44′17″E

Geography
- Location within Subcarpathian Voivodeship Location within Poland
- Location: Podkarpacie, Poland
- Parent range: Bieszczady Mountains

Climbing
- Easiest route: hike

Tarnica is a peak in the Bieszczady Mountains in southern Poland. Its height is 1,346 metres. It is one of the Polish Crown Peaks.

The summit towers 500 metres above the Wołosatka Valley. It can be easily told apart from its neighbours by its distinctive shape. The mountain has two separate summits, one of 1,339 and one of 1,346 metres. The southern part is a steep rocky wall, while the other side consist of less steep rocky fields.

== Hiking trails ==
- European walking route E8
  - Prešov - Miháľov - Kurimka - Dukla - Iwonicz-Zdrój – Rymanów-Zdrój - Puławy – Tokarnia (778 m) – Kamień (717 m) – Komańcza - Cisna - Ustrzyki Górne - Tarnica - Wołosate.
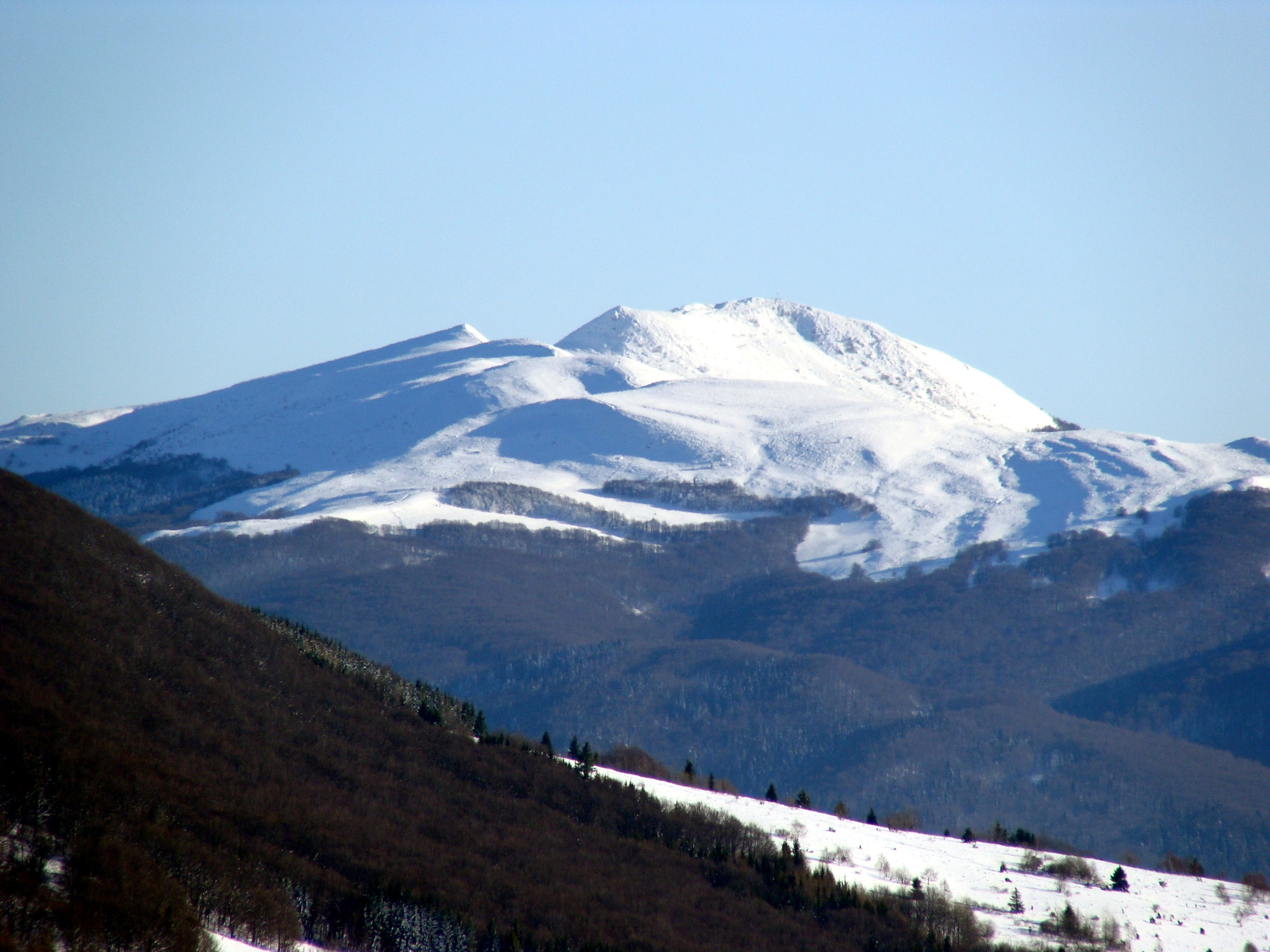
Western face of Tarnica, December 2008

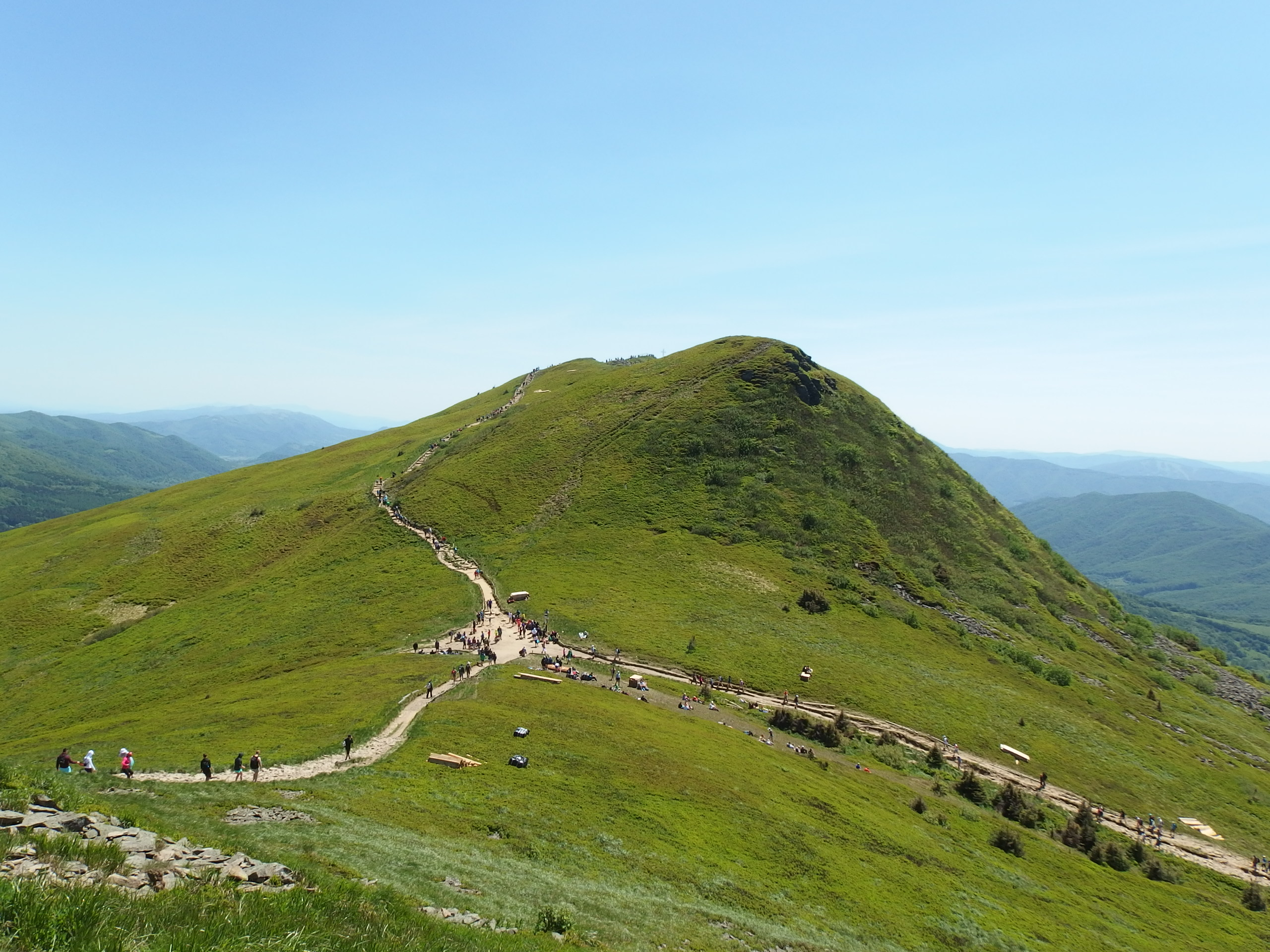
Northern face of Tarnica, June 2015

== See also ==
- Bieszczady National Park

Media related to Bieszczady at Wikimedia Commons
