= Iwonicz-Zdrój =

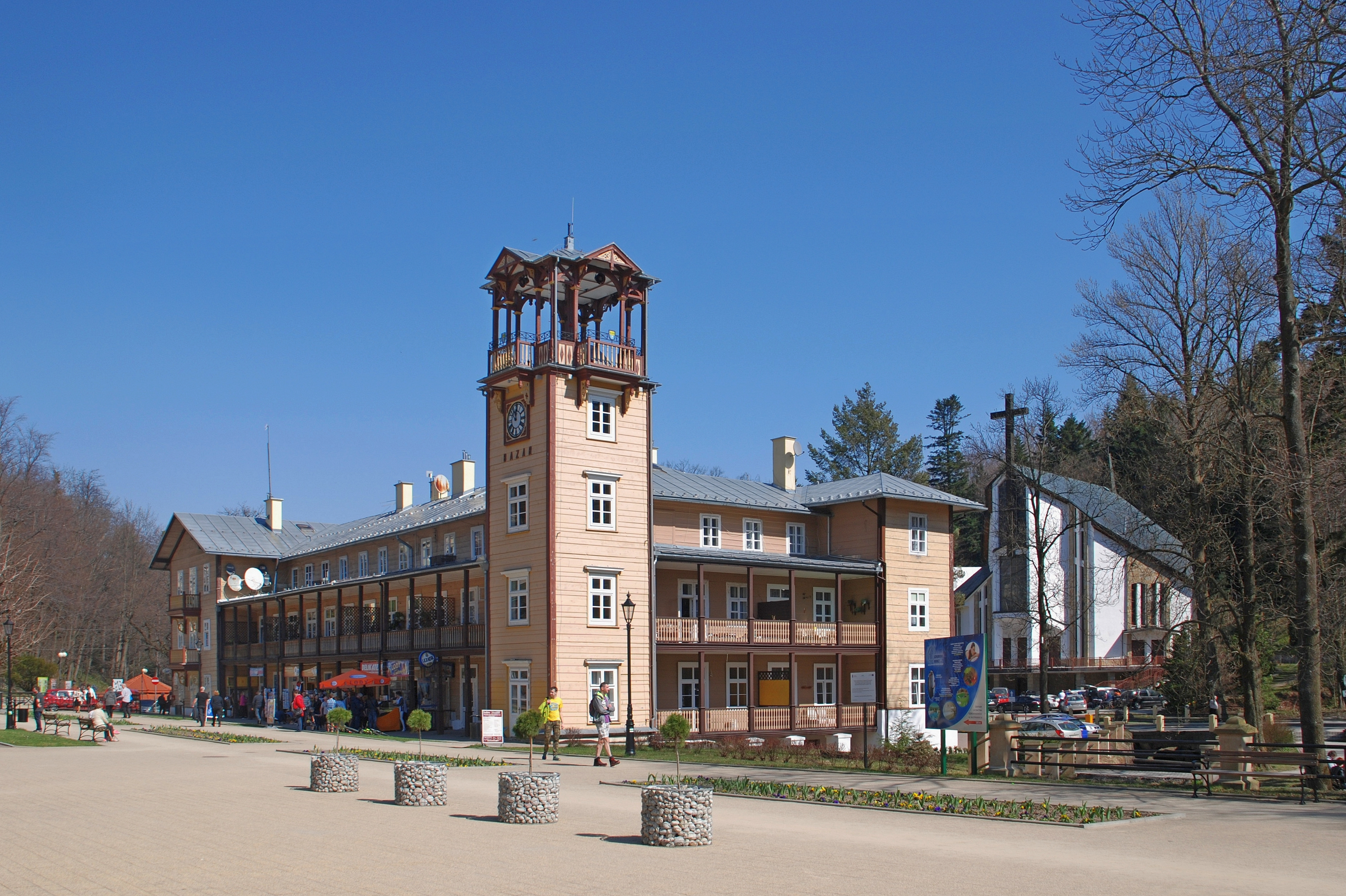
- Bazar guesthouse in Iwonicz-Zdrój

- Coat of arms

- Location within Poland
- Coordinates: 49°34′24″N 21°47′37″E
- Country: Poland
- Voivodeship: Subcarpathian
- County: Krosno
- Gmina: Iwonicz-Zdrój

Government
  - Mayor: Grzegorz Nieradka (PiS)

Area
  - Total: 5.82 km^{2} (2.25 sq mi)
- Elevation: 410 m (1,350 ft)

Population (2007)
  - Total: 1,900
  - Density: 330/km^{2} (850/sq mi)
- Time zone: UTC+1 (CET)
  - Summer (DST): UTC+2 (CEST)
- Postal code: 38-440
- Car plates: RKR
- Website: http://www.iwonicz-zdroj.pl

Iwonicz-Zdrój ([iˈvɔɲit͡ʂ ˈzdruj]) is a spa town in south-eastern Poland, in Subcarpathian Voivodship, in Krosno County. It has 1,831 inhabitants (02.06.2009). It is located in the heartland of the Doły (Pits), and its average altitude is 410 metres (1,350 ft) above sea level, although there are some hills located within the confines of the town. It is one of the oldest health resorts in Poland.

== History ==
Iwonicz-Zdroj is one of Poland's oldest health resorts and spas, dating back to 1578, which was famous outside Poland already in the 18th century. The town lies in the south-eastern part of Podkarpackie voivodship, Krosno province. The town is surrounded on all sides by high mixed forest. It lies at 400 metres (1,312 feet) above sea level. This unusual location among hills of Beskid Niski, in the valley of Iwonicki Potok (Iwonicz Stream), undeniably rates Iwonicz highly among those places, which charm guests with their beauty and still immaculately clean air. The resort is at a distance of 80 kilometres (50 miles) to the south from the voivodship capital – Rzeszów, and 16 km (10 miles) from Krosno. It is about 180 km (112 miles) away from Kraków. The Iwonicz climate is described as foothills climate with properties of sub-alpine climate, what is important and advantageous in health resort treatment. The Iwonicz forests create a microclimate around the resort, regulating humidity and temperature of the air, protecting it from winds and are a source of ozone. The resort is situated in the area of the greatest insolation and lowest cloudiness in Poland, which, all-in-all makes it a perfect spot for soothing, refreshing and regenerating the body.

The greatest wealth of Iwonicz land are mineral waters and moor mud, which are natural curative agents. These are chloride-bicarbonate-sodium, fluoride, iodide, boric and bromide waters. They are mainly extracted from geological levels so called second and third Ciężkowice sandstone where they occur close to natural gas and crude oil deposits. They are used for drinking therapy, mineral baths, inhalations and production of iodide-bromine salt.

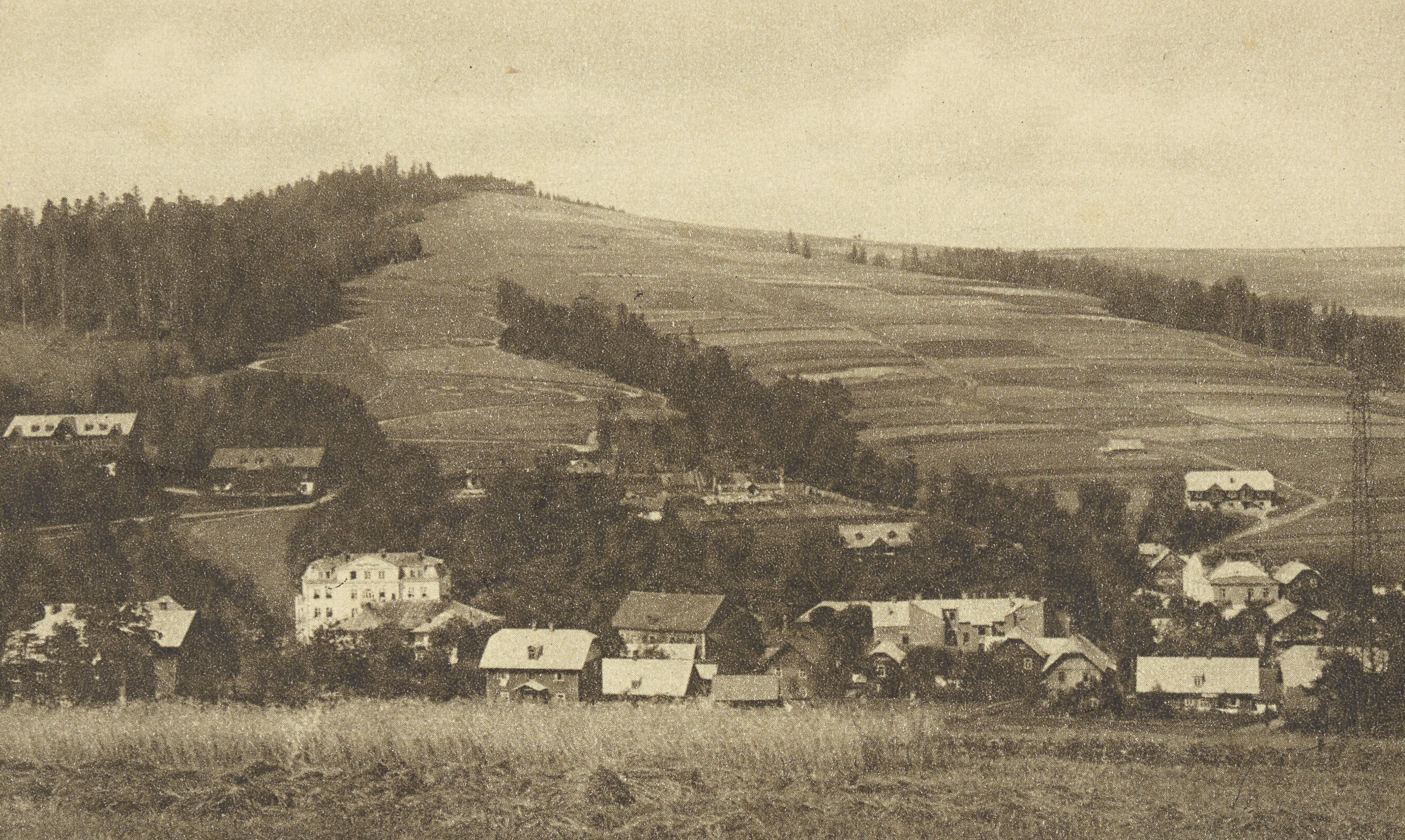
General view, before 1939

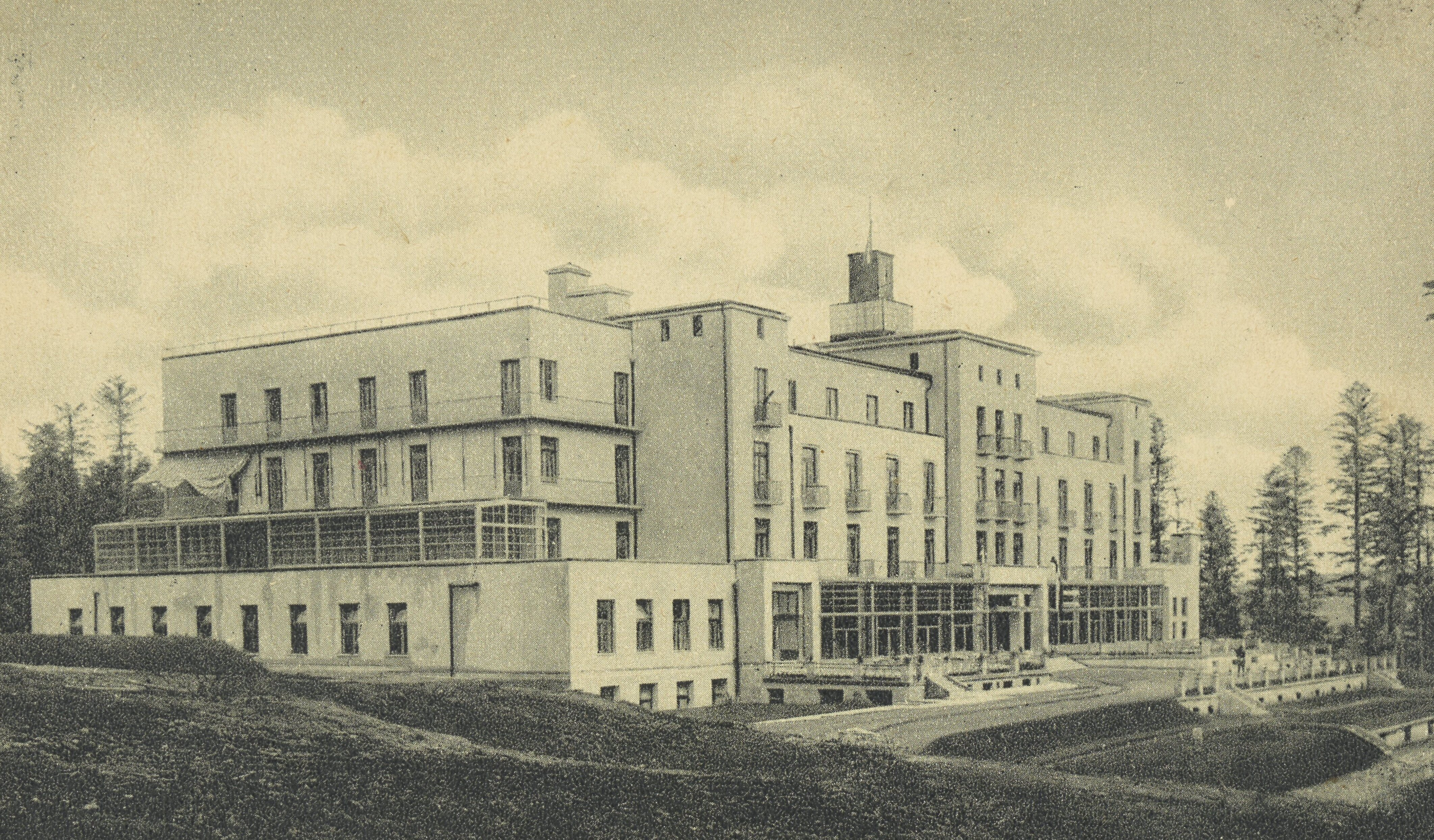
Excelsior Sanatorium, 1935

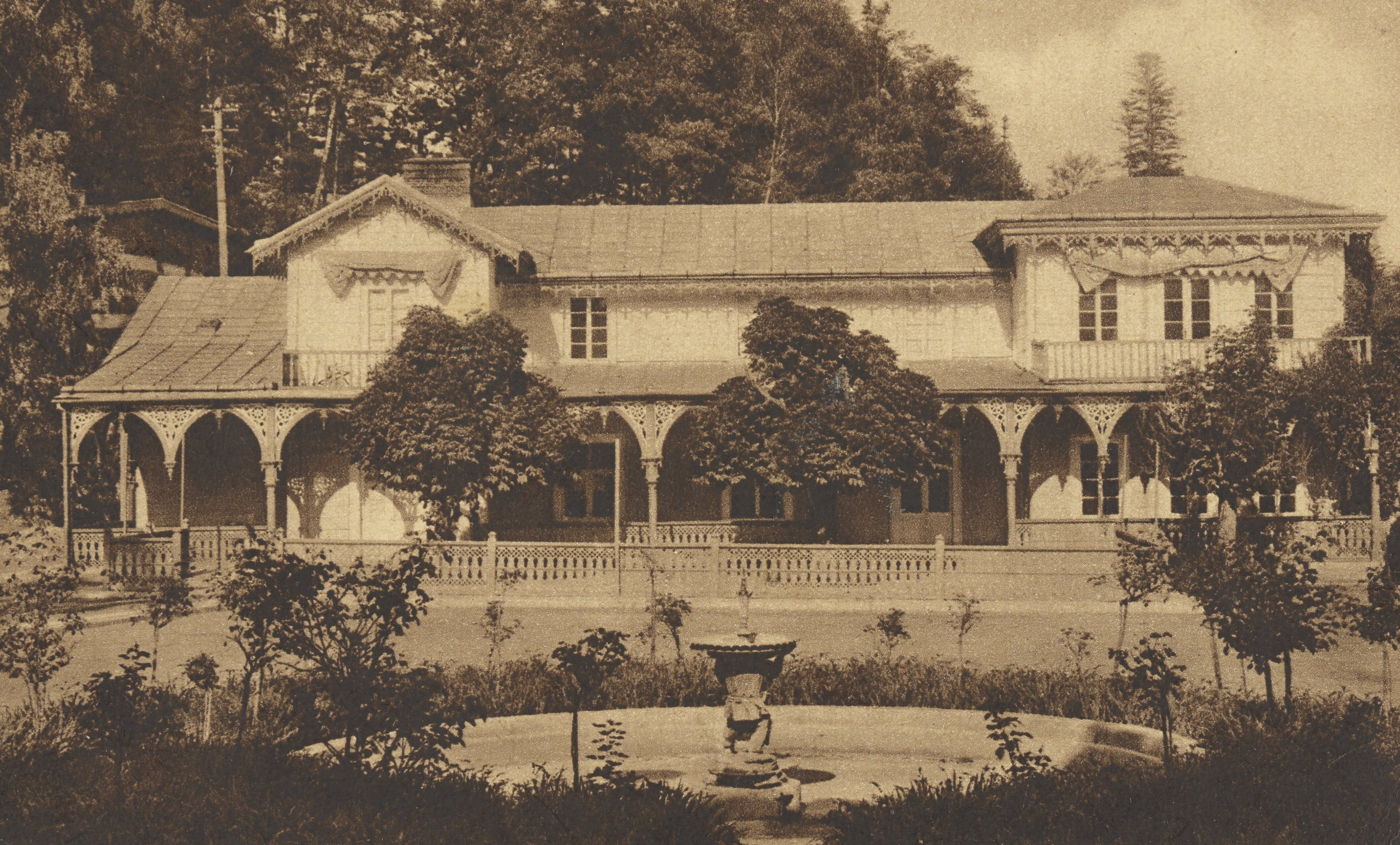
Spa house, before 1939

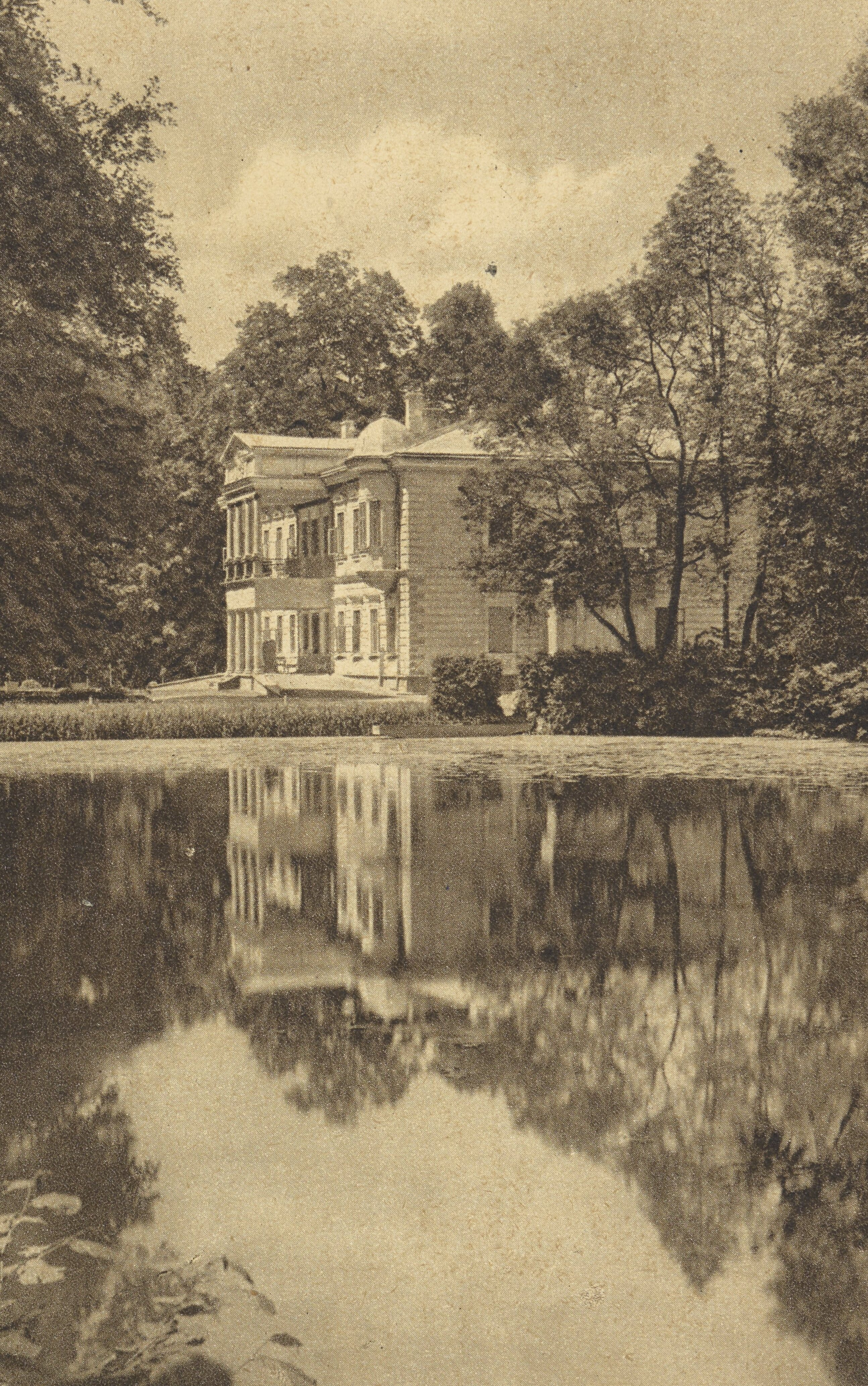
The Załuski Palace, before 1939

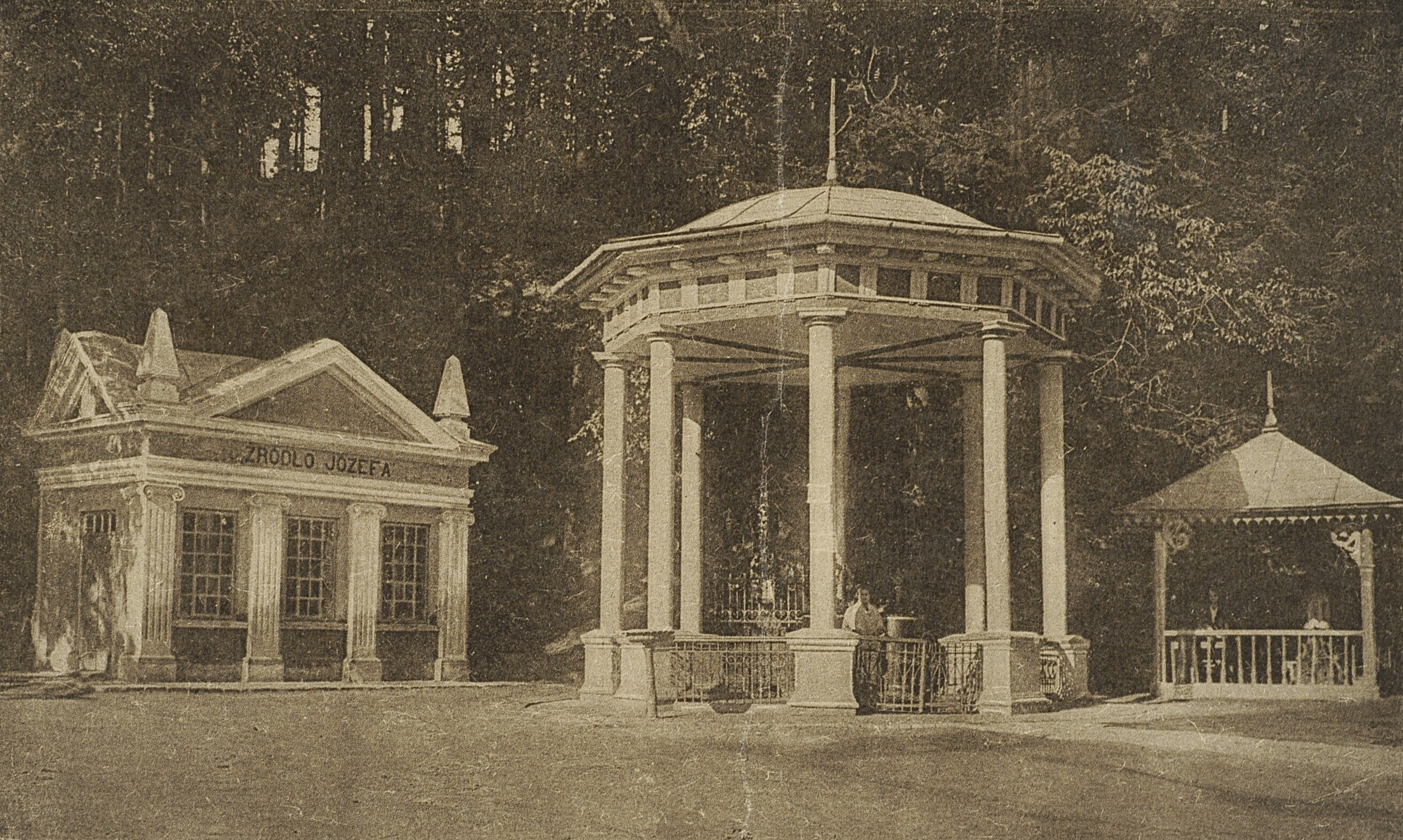
Source of Józef Karol and Amelia, before 1939

== Hiking trails ==
- European walking route E8
  - Prešov - Miháľov - Kurimka - Dukla - Iwonicz-Zdrój – Rymanów-Zdrój - Puławy – Tokarnia (778 m) – Kamień (717 m) – Komańcza - Cisna - Ustrzyki Górne - Tarnica - Wołosate.

== Gallery ==
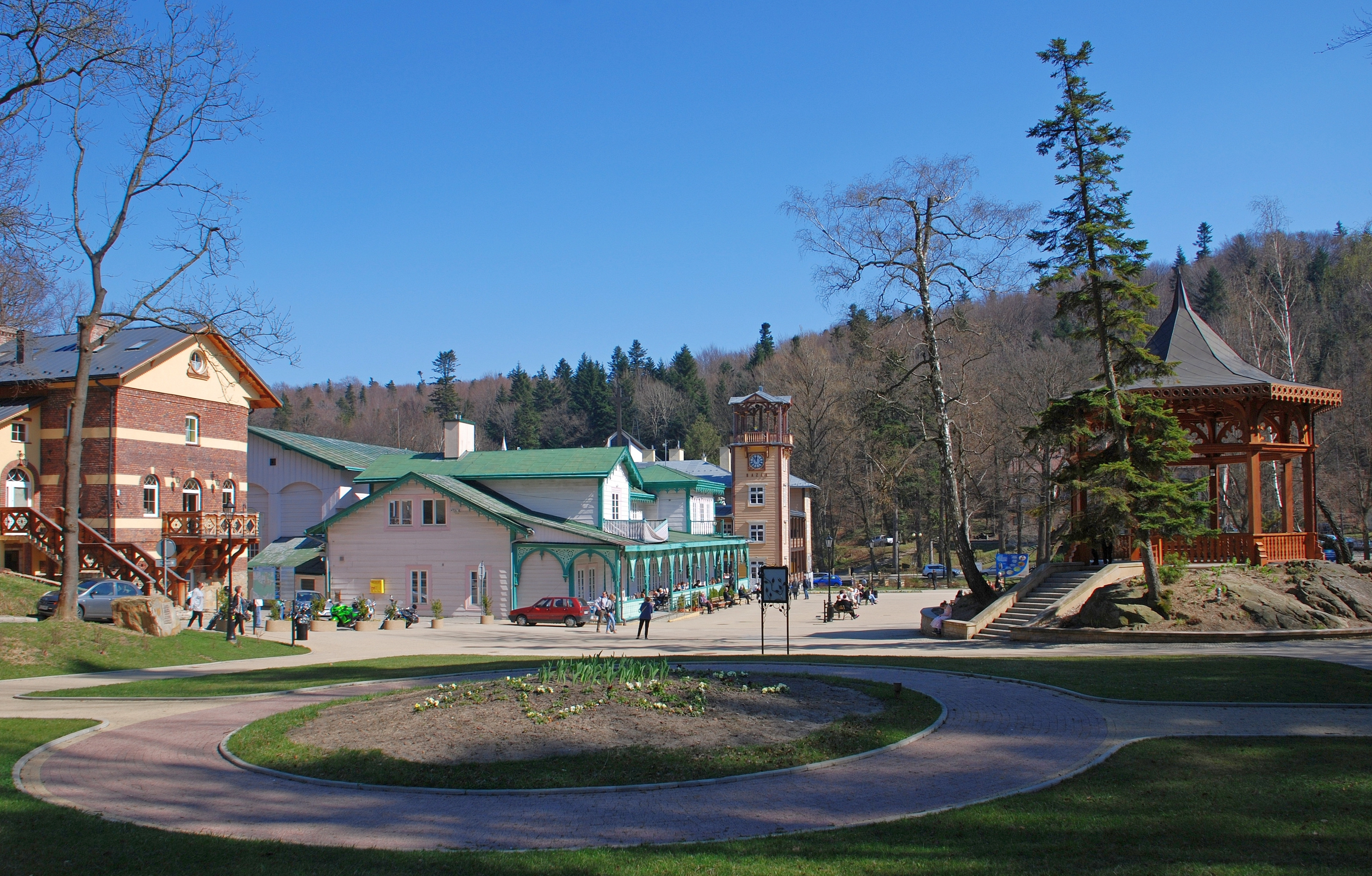
Town centre

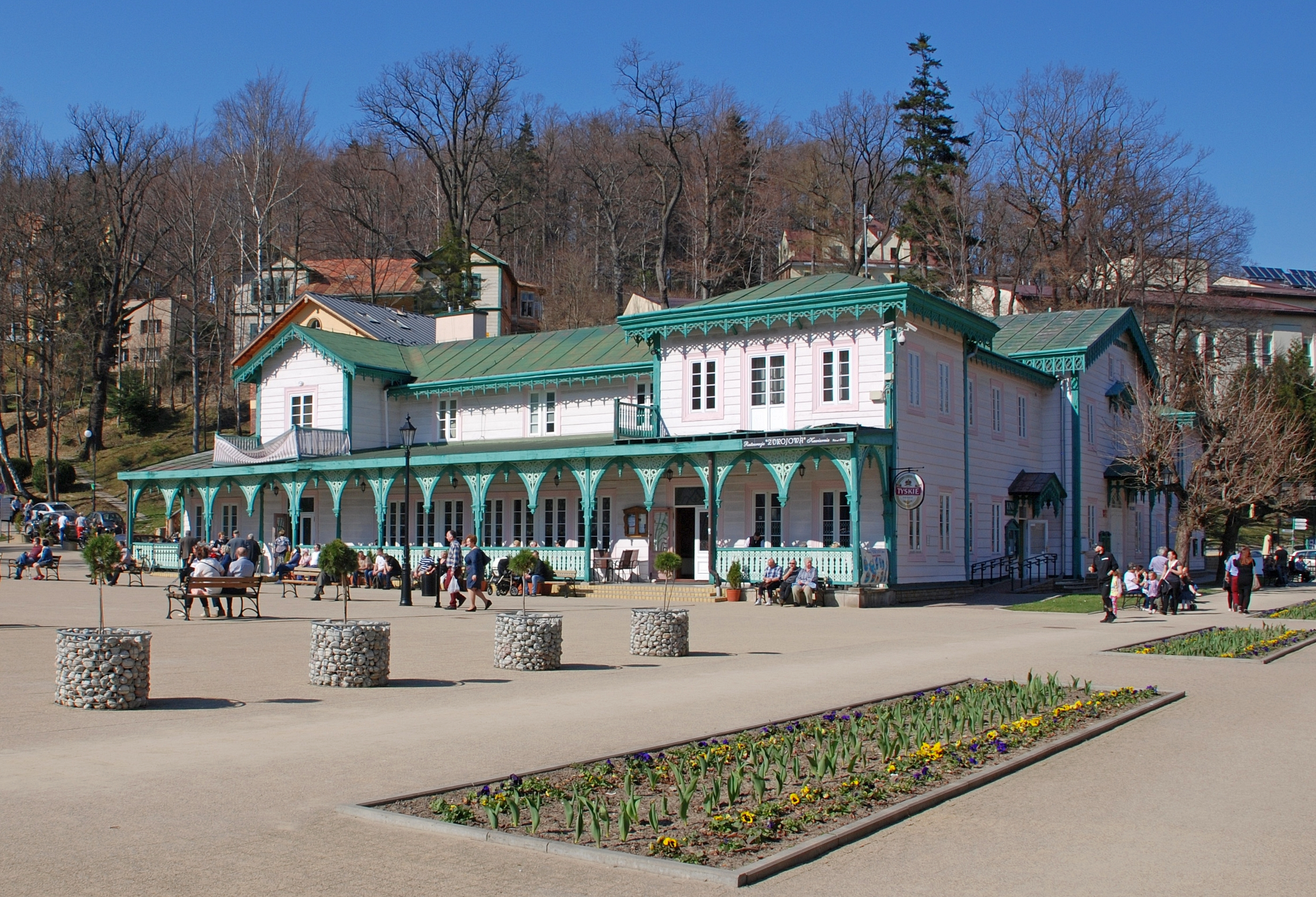
Drinking house

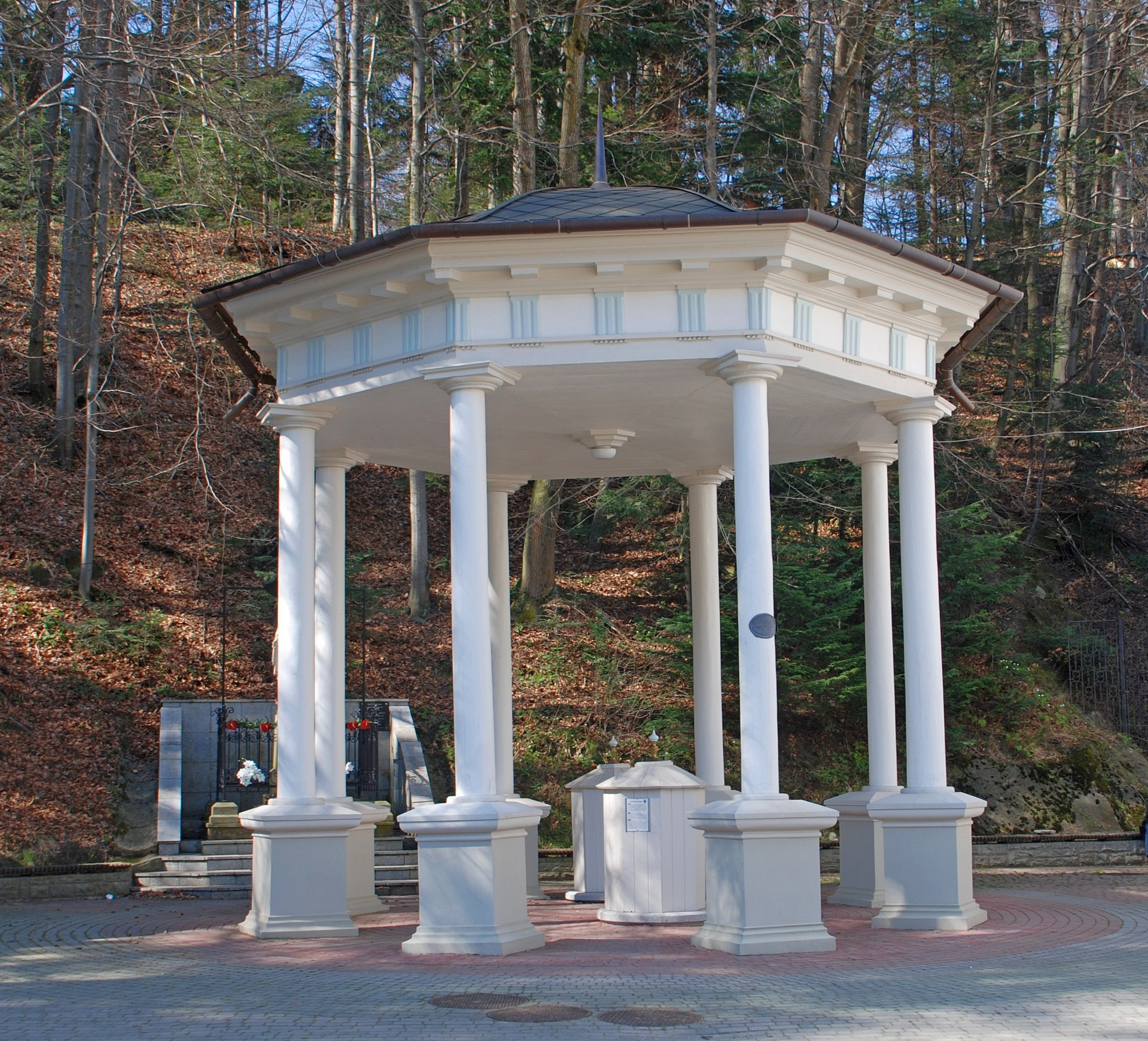
The Nad Źródłami Pavilion

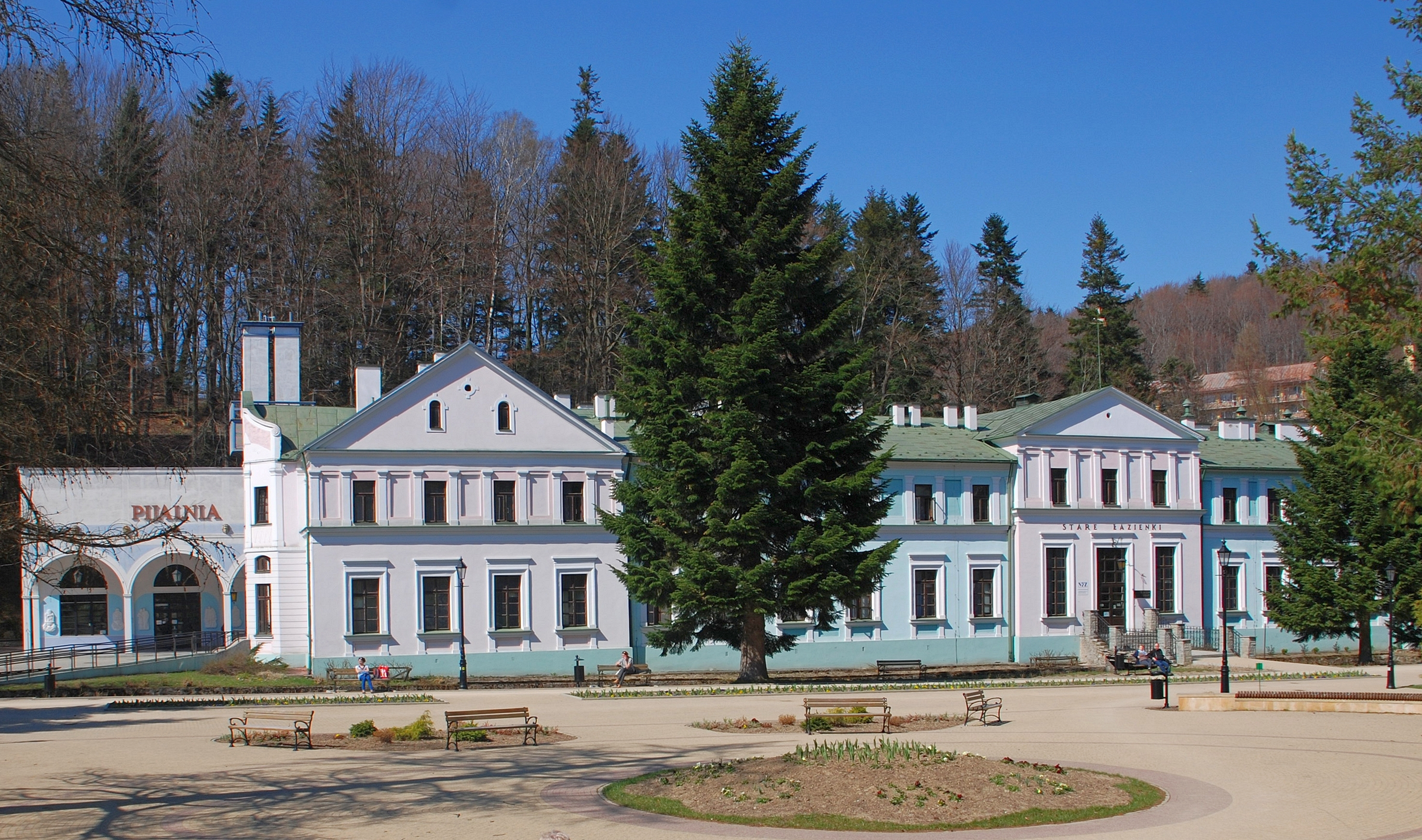
Stare Łazienki sanatorium

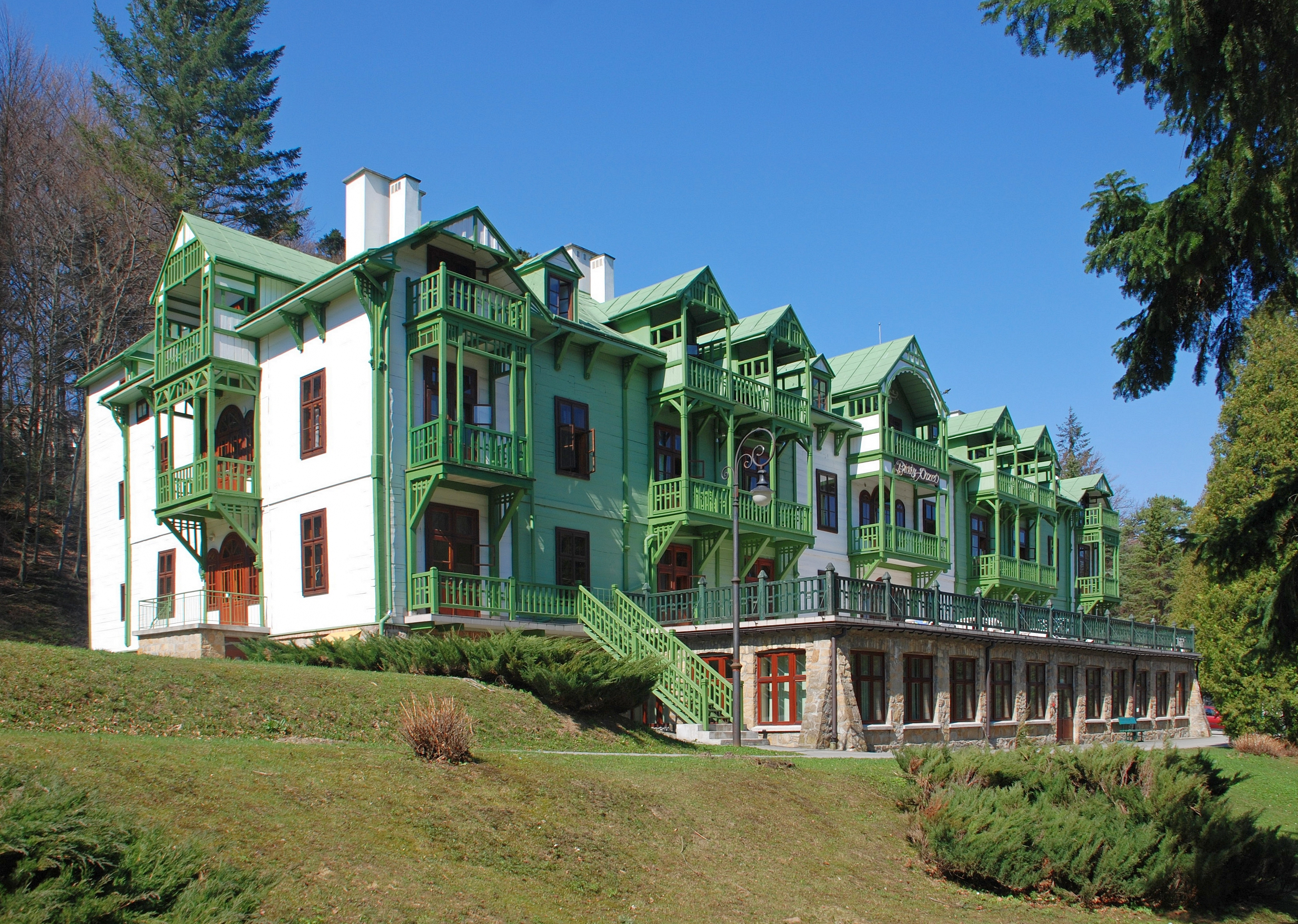
White Eagle sanatorium

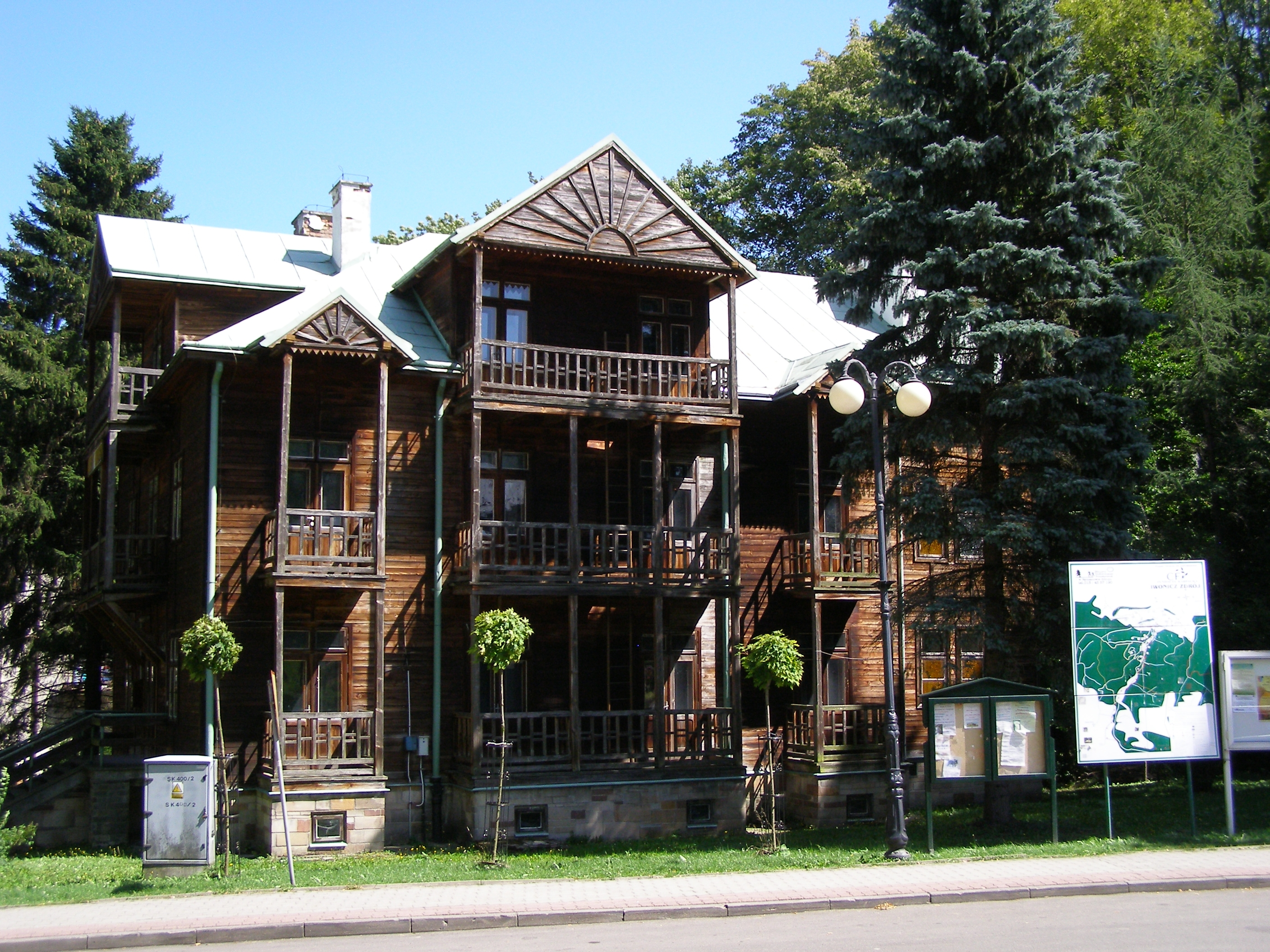
Little Eagle sanatorium

== See also ==
- List of spa towns in Poland
