= Tokarnia (mountain) =

Mountain in Poland

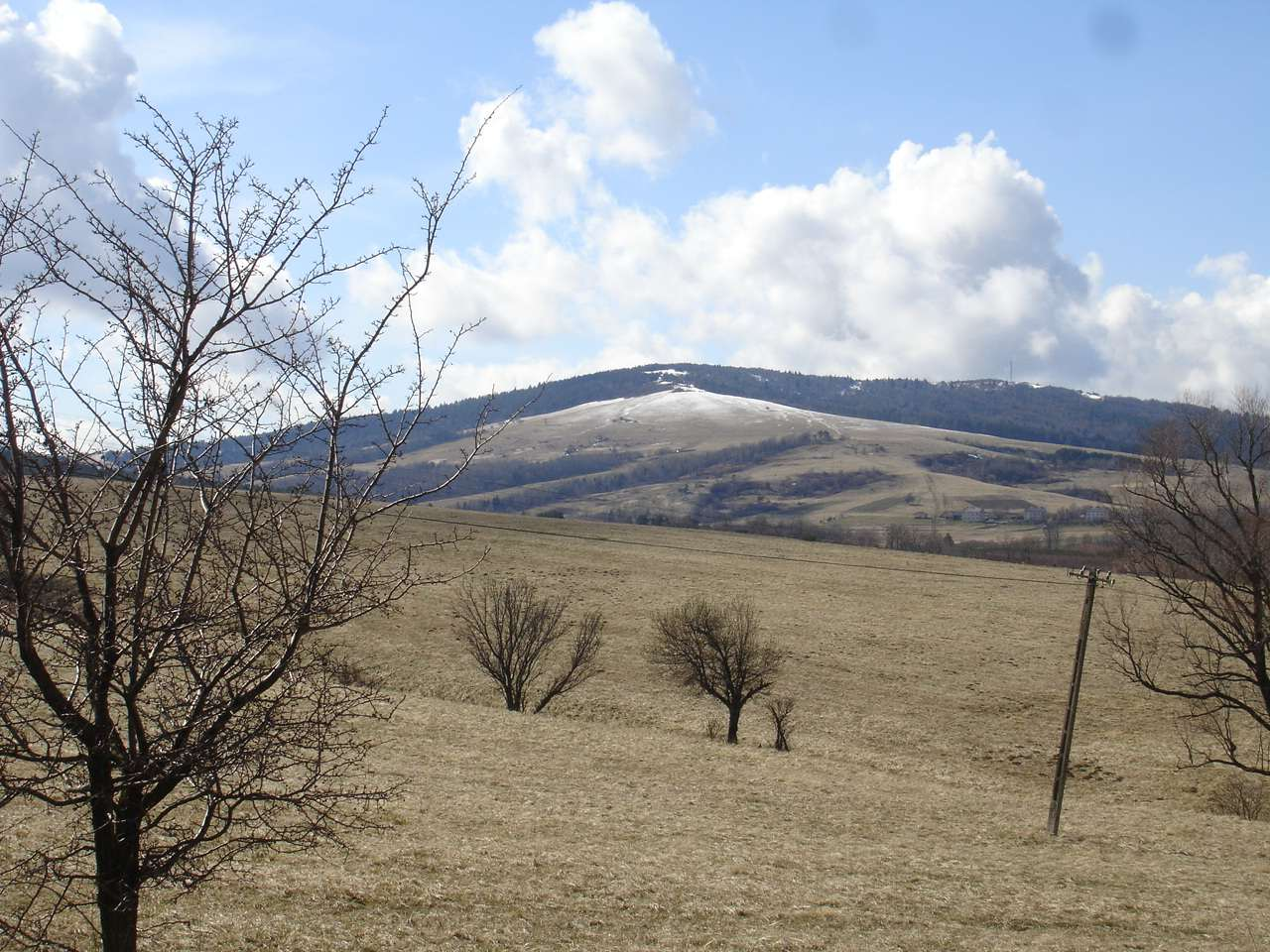
- Northern summit

Highest point
- Elevation: 778 m (2,552 ft)
- Listing: Mountains of Poland
- Coordinates: 49°27′46″N 22°04′17″E

Naming
- English translation: tokować, meaning birds breeding dances hill
- Language of name: lechitic dialect

Geography
- Location within Poland
- Location: Podkarpacie, Poland
- Parent range: Bukowica Range

Climbing
- Easiest route: Hike

Tokarnia is a peak in the Bukowica Range (part of the Pogórze Bukowskie ) in southern Poland. Its height is 778 metres (2,552 ft). The southern part is a steep rocky wall, while the other side consists of less steep rocky fields. The Bukowica Range separates the western Low Beskids from the eastern Pogórze Bukowskie.

== Hiking trails ==
- European walking route E8
  - Iwonicz-Zdrój – Rymanów-Zdrój - Puławy – Tokarnia (778 m) – Przybyszów – Kamień (717 m) – Komańcza (Główny Szlak Beskidzki)
  - Pasmo Bukowicy - Kanasiówka (823 m) – Wisłok Wielki – Tokarnia (778 m), 1 km – Wola Piotrowa
  - Komańcza – Dołżyca – Garb Średni (822 m) – Kanasiówka (823 m) – Moszczaniec – Surowica – Darów – Puławy Górne– Besko

== See also ==
- Bieszczady National Park
