= Rymanów-Zdrój =

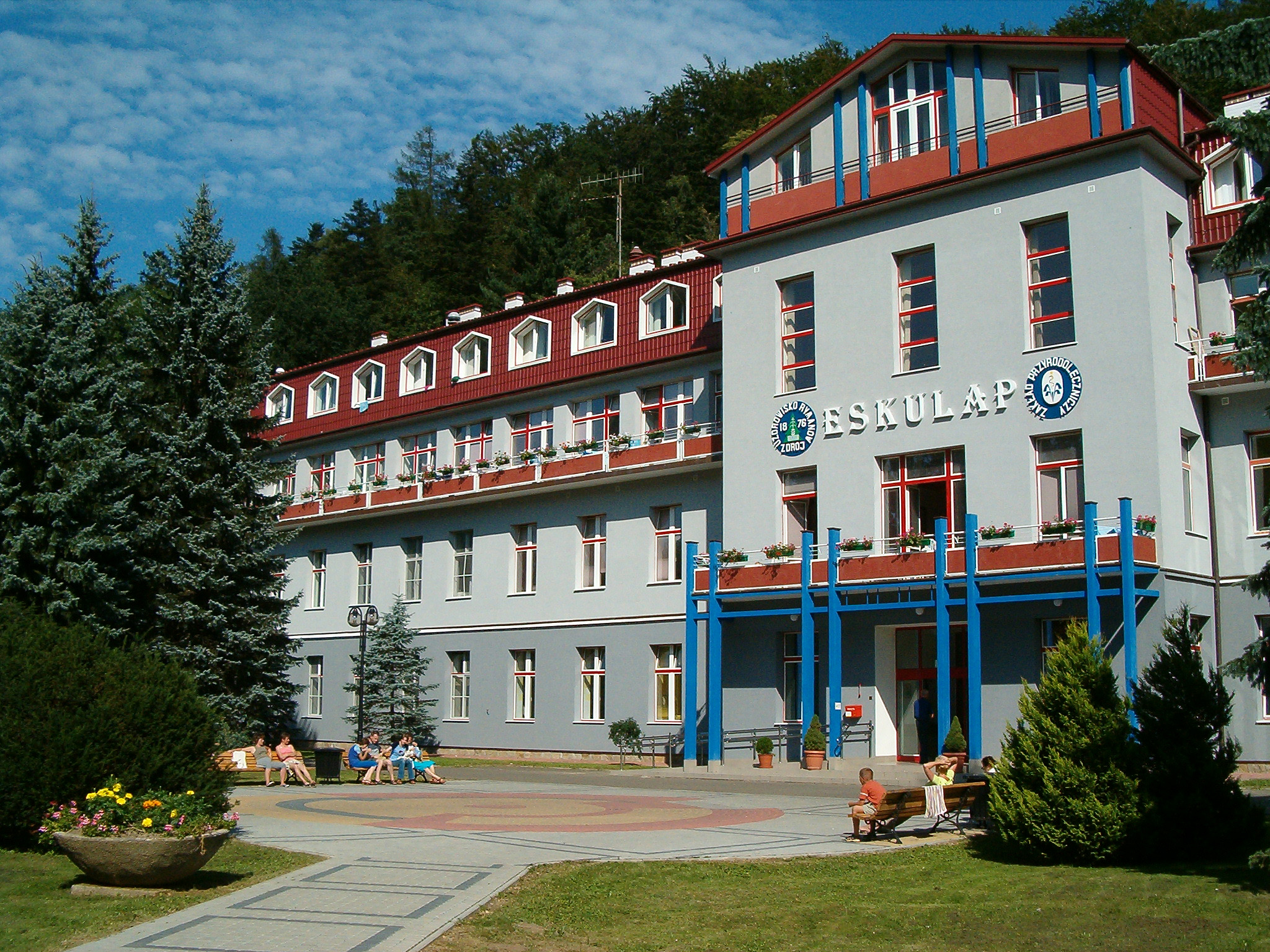
- Mineral water tap room in Rymanów Zdrój

- Coat of arms

- Location within Poland
- Coordinates: 49°33′N 21°51′E
- Country: Poland
- Voivodeship: Subcarpathian
- County: Krosno
- Gmina: Rymanów

Area
  - Total: 5.82 km^{2} (2.25 sq mi)
- Elevation: 410 m (1,350 ft)

Population (2006)
  - Total: 1,700
  - Density: 290/km^{2} (760/sq mi)
- Time zone: UTC+1 (CET)
  - Summer (DST): UTC+2 (CEST)
- Postal code: 38-440
- Car plates: RKR
- Website: www.rymanow-zdroj.pl

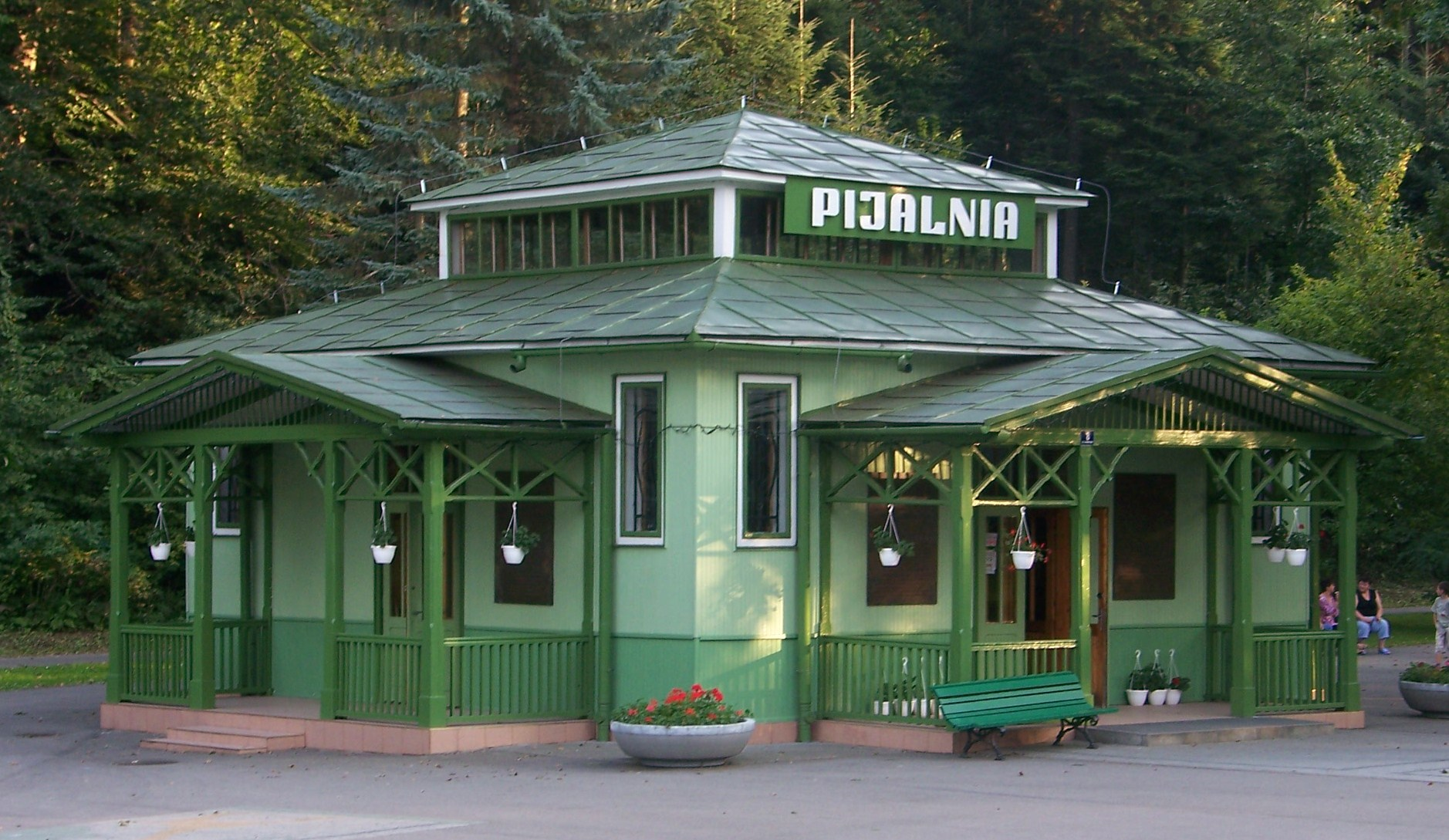
Mineral water tap room in Rymanów Zdrój

Rymanów-Zdrój ([rɨˈmanuf ˈzdrui̯]) is a village and a spa in southern Poland, in Subcarpathian Voivodeship, in Krosno County.

== Location ==
Rymanów-Zdrój lies 4 km (2.5 mi) south of the town of Rymanów, in the valley of the river Tabor surrounded by low mountains. It is located in the heartland of the Doły (Pits), and its average altitude is 430 metres (1,410 ft) above sea level, although there are some hills located within the confines of the city.

== History ==
The source of mineral water was discovered in 1876. The popularity of the nearby spa, Iwonicz Zdrój, caused the owners of the Rymanów estate, Anna and Stanisław Potocki, to look for similar springs in the river valley. A chemist, Tytus Sławik, who was staying with them, analyzed the water in a spring and found a high concentration of iodine and iron. In 1877, Prof. Dr Wesselshy, a Viennese chemist, confirmed the initial analysis. Shortly the first boarding, houses were built and pipes installed to bring the water from the spring to them.

In 1882, the new spa received a silver medal at an exhibition in Kraków. From that moment, the spa expanded rapidly. A children's sanatorium was built in 1885, and a spa pavilion in 1885. The resort became popular with the rising middle class of Lwów, the capital of the Galicia province in the Kingdom of Galicia and Lodomeria. Many private, ornate villas were constructed.

During World War I, the front lines moved through Rymanów three times and the spa suffered severe damage. It was restored and reopened in 1926 and many new villas and installations were built. In the late 1930s, up to 5,000 people visited the spa annually.

During World War II, the spa was almost totally destroyed. After the war, it was rebuilt as a children's sanatorium. In 1965, a new sanatorium was built for adults with 120 beds. In 1980, a plant was built for the bottling of the water and soft drinks. In 1986, on the 120th anniversary of the original founding, the spa was set up as a separate community called Rymanów-Zdrój, with an area of 1,525 ha (3,770 acres). Once more, it became a resort. There are several marked hiking trails leading into the surrounding mountains

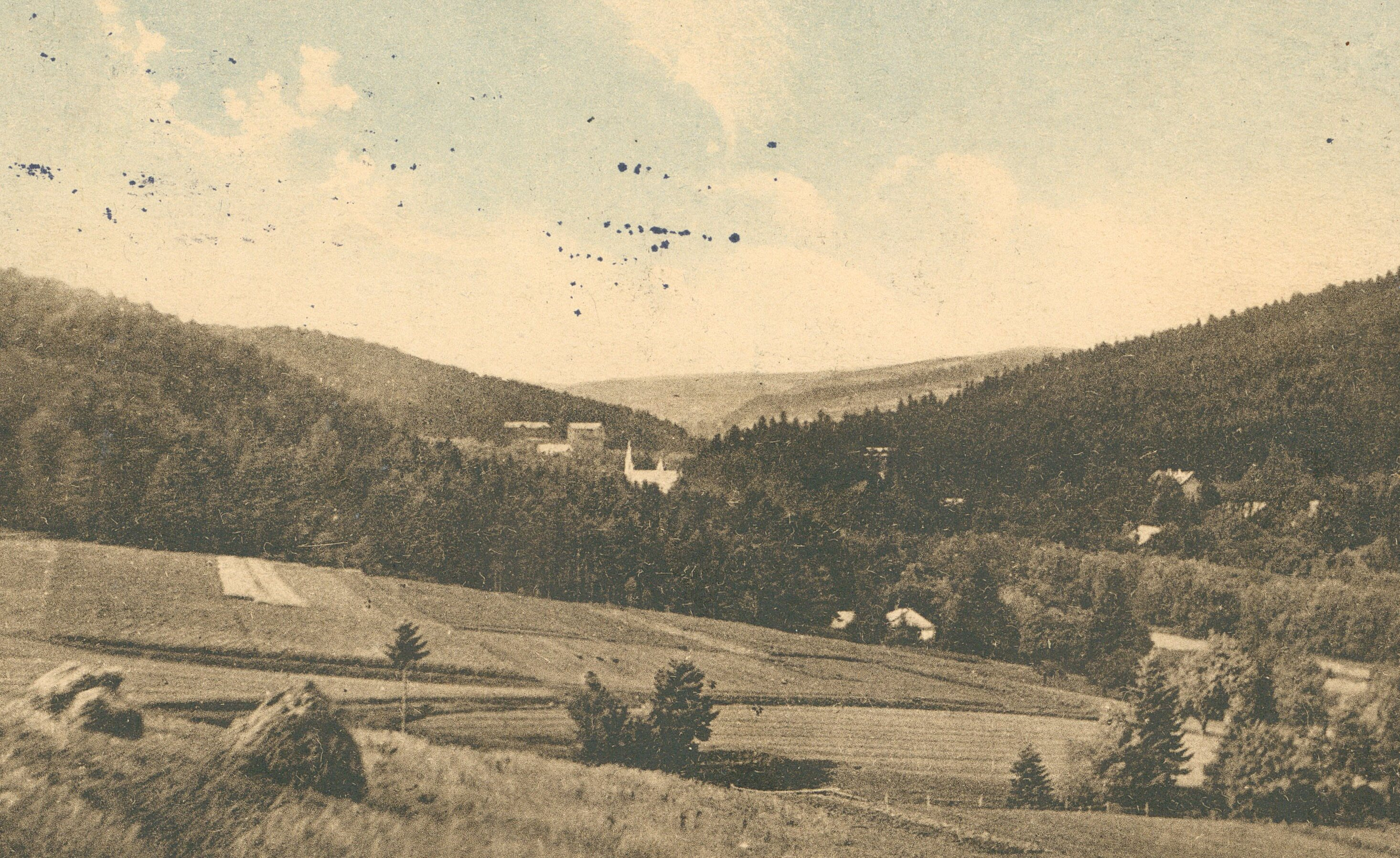
General view, 1928

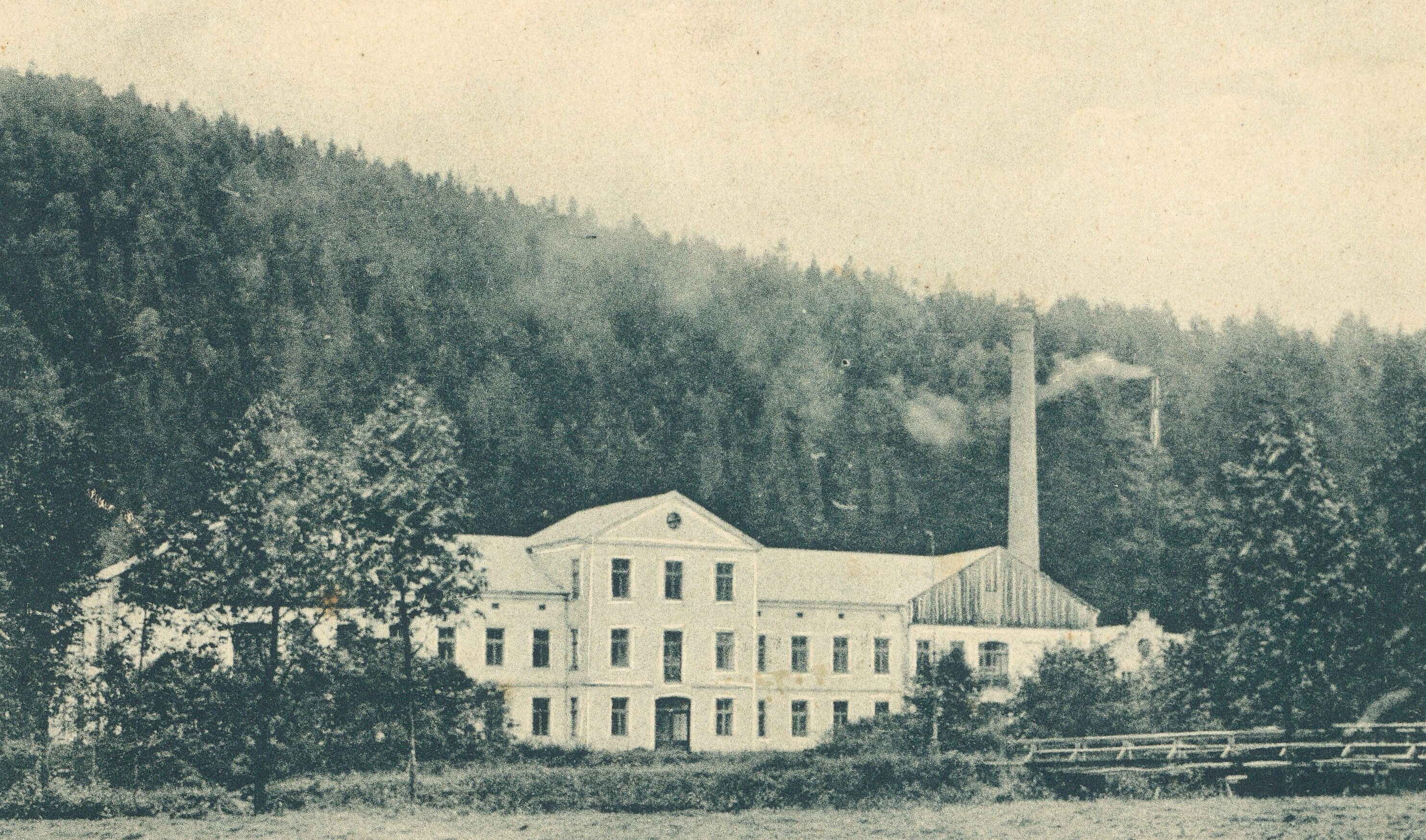
Bathrooms, before 1939

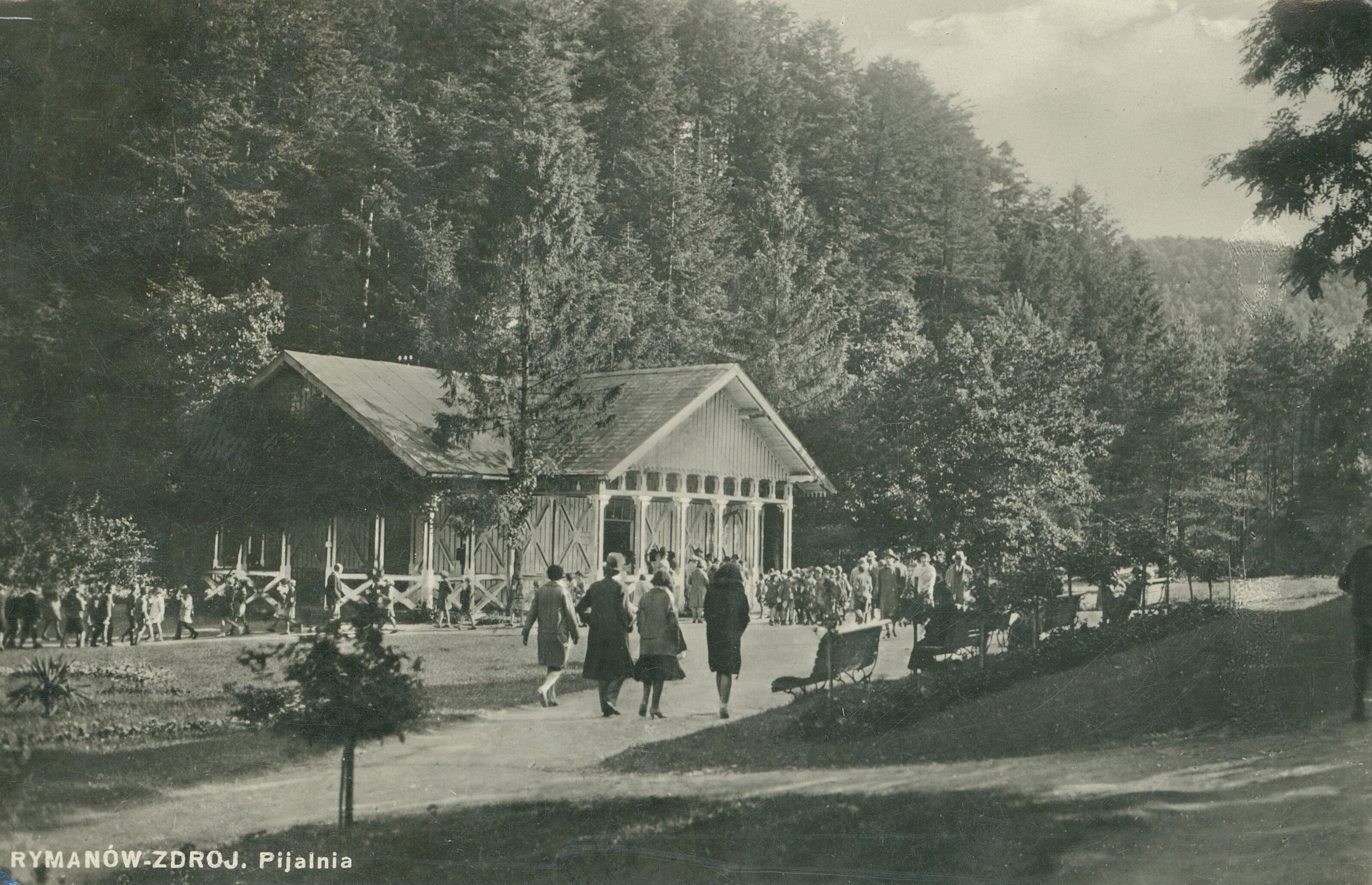
Pump room, before 1939

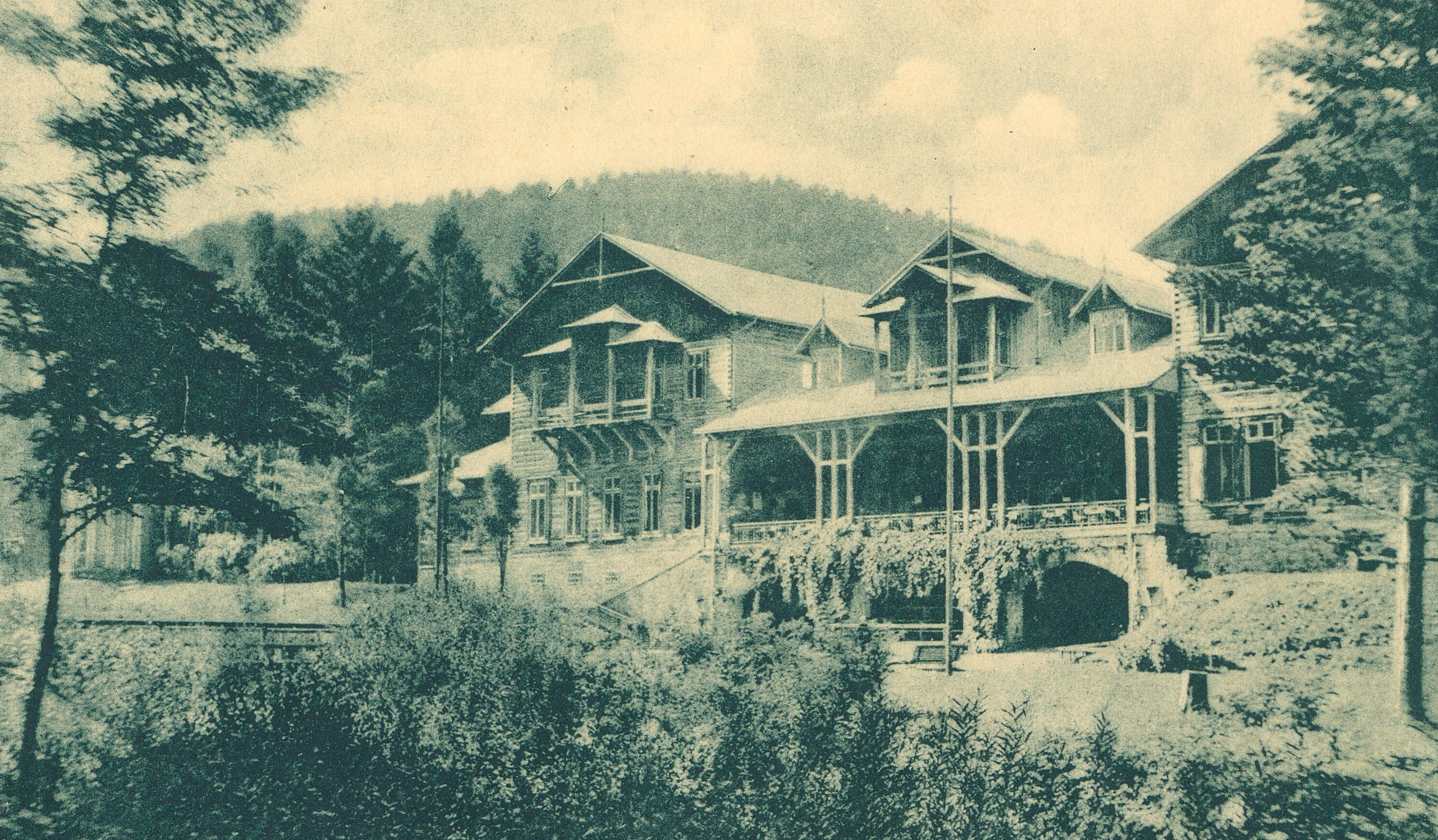
Spa uouse, before 1939

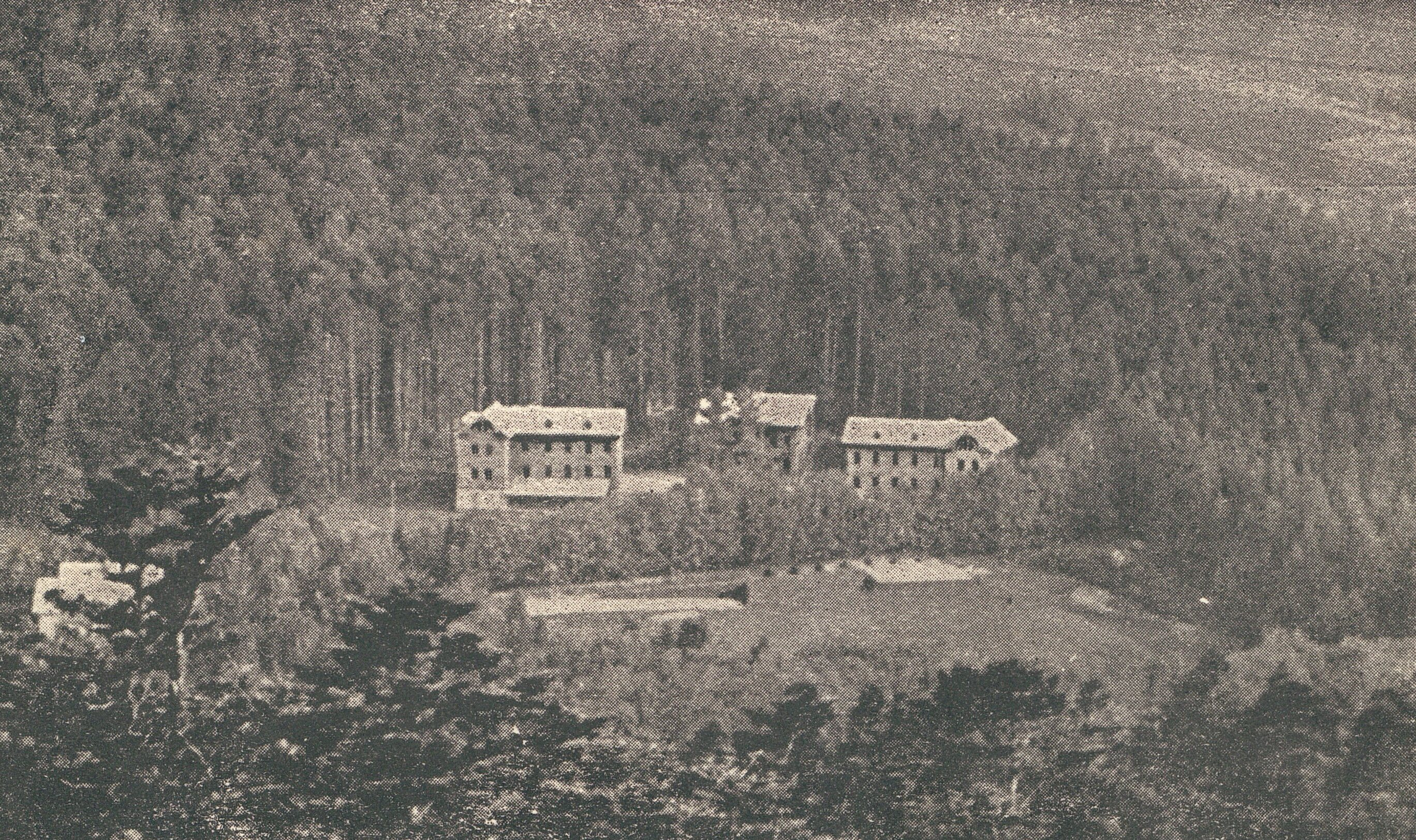
Lviv medicinal colony

== Famous visitors ==
During the pre-1914 years, and also from 1926 to 1939, Rymanów-Zdrój was frequented by many famous people, including:

- Prince Albrecht - uncle of Emperor Franz Joseph
- Stanisław Wyspiański - poet
- Ludomir Różycki - composer
- Kazimierz Przerwa-Tetmajer - poet and writer
- Mieczysław Fogg - cabaret singer performed here in the 1930s

== Hiking trails ==
- European walking route E8
  - Prešov - Miháľov - Kurimka - Dukla - Iwonicz-Zdrój – Rymanów-Zdrój - Puławy – Tokarnia (778 m) – Kamień (717 m) – Komańcza - Cisna - Ustrzyki Górne - Tarnica - Wołosate.

== See also ==
- Rymanów
- Spa town
- Apostolic Exarchate of Łemkowszczyzna
