= Puławy, Podkarpackie Voivodeship =

Lemko village in Poland

Puławy Пулавы
- Hamlet
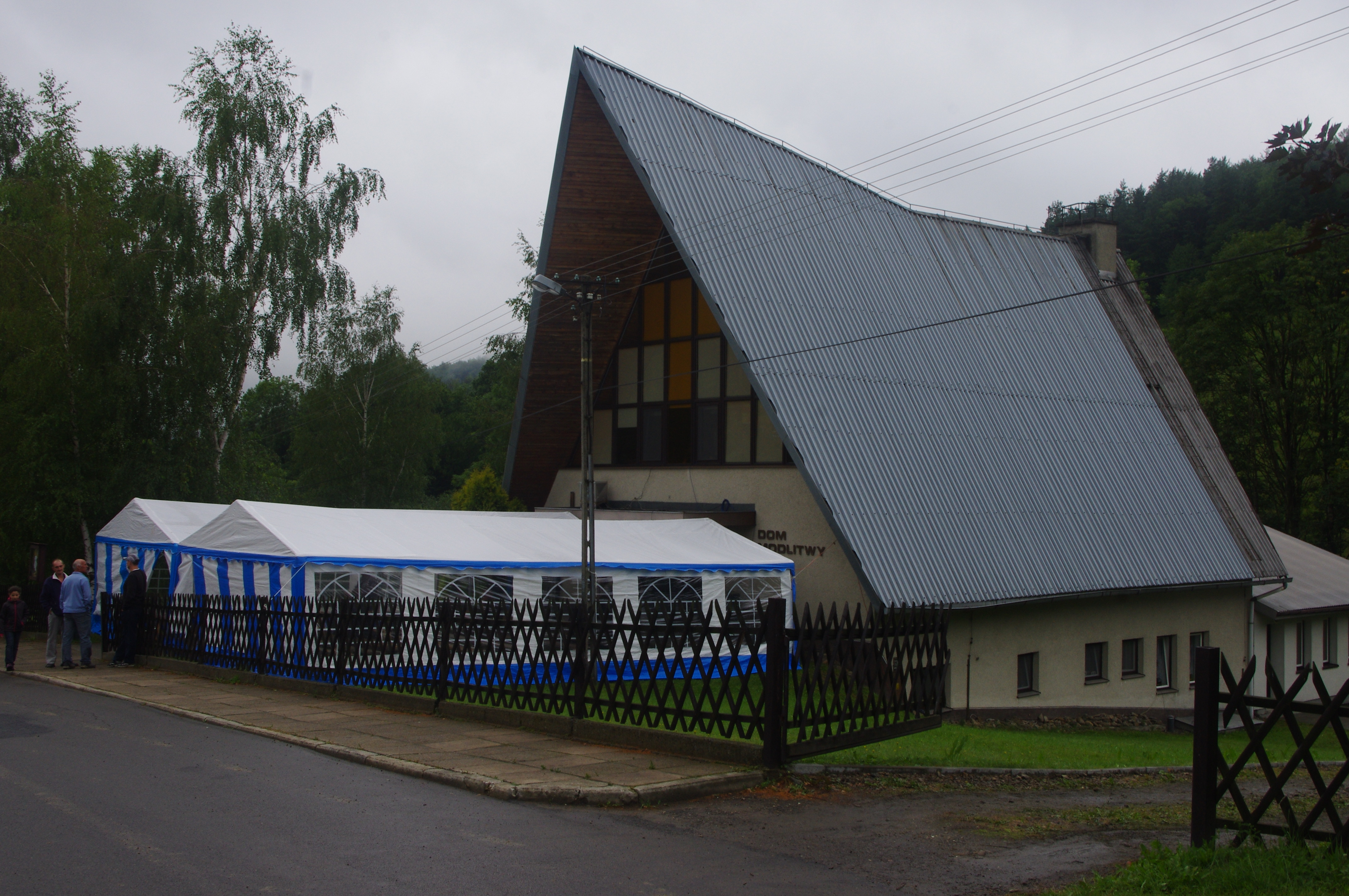
- A Pentecostal church in the hamlet

- Location within Poland
- Coordinates: 49°31′N 21°54′E
- Country: Poland
- Voivodeship: Subcarpathian
- County: Krosno
- Gmina: Rymanów
- Population: 140

Puławy [puˈwavɨ] is a hamlet in the administrative district of Gmina Rymanów, within Krosno County, Subcarpathian Voivodeship, in south-eastern Poland.
