= Wołosate =

- Village
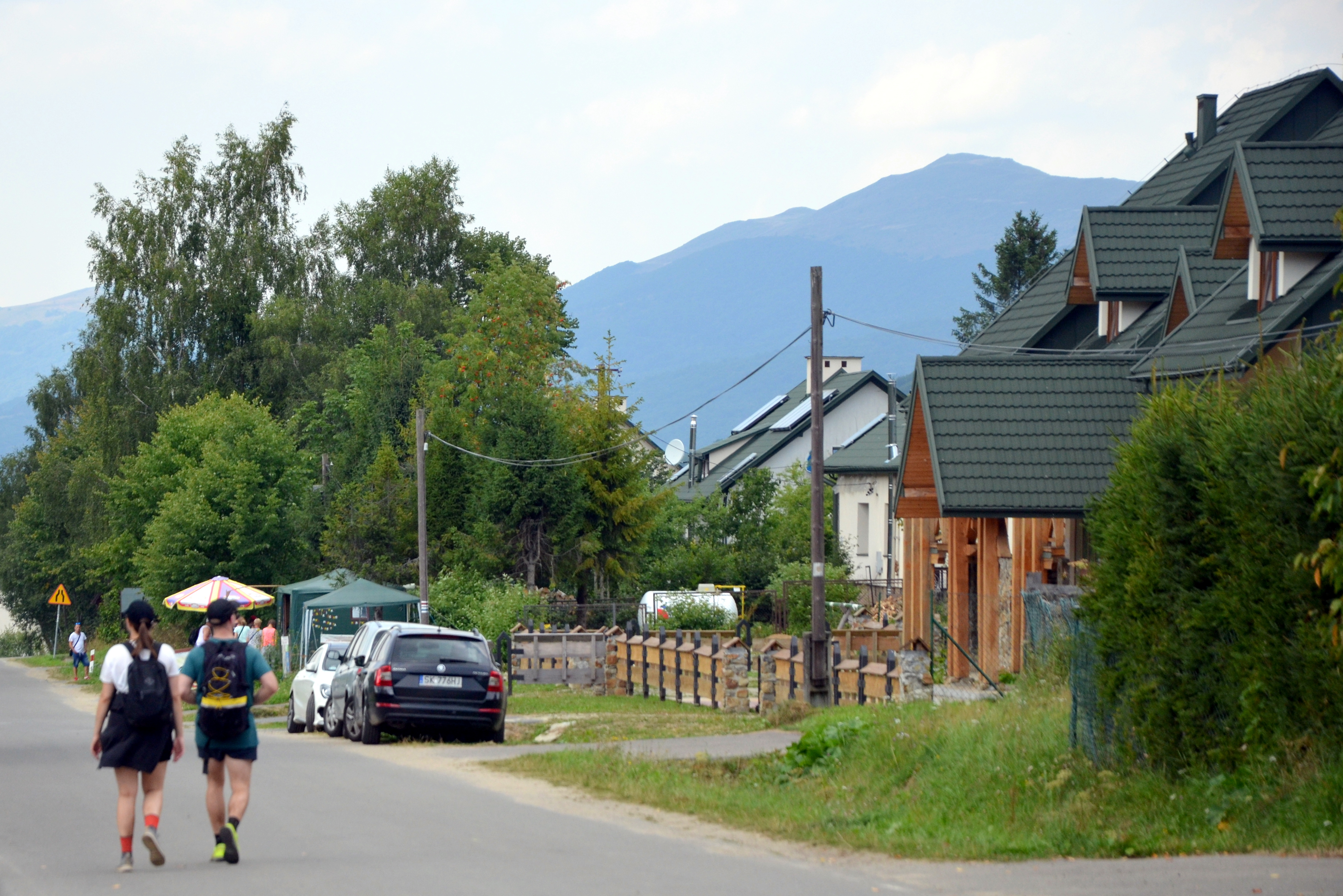

- Location within Poland
- Coordinates: 49°3′17″N 22°41′43″E
- Country: Poland
- Voivodeship: Subcarpathian
- County: Bieszczady
- Gmina: Lutowiska
- Elevation: 730 m (2,400 ft)
- Population (2020): 44

Wołosate [vɔwɔˈsatɛ], formerly known as Roztoka from 1977–1981, is a village in the administrative district of Gmina Lutowiska, within Bieszczady County, Subcarpathian Voivodeship, in south-eastern Poland, close to the border with Ukraine. It is also the southernmost inhabited village in Poland, and also marks either the start (if one travels westward) or finish (if one travels eastward) of the Main Beskid Trail.
