= Vasilkovo, Yaroslavl Oblast =

Village in Yaroslavl Oblast, Russia

Vasilkovo Васильково
- Village
- Interactive map of Vasilkovo
- Country: Russia
- Oblast: Yaroslavl Oblast
- District: Poshekhonsky District
- Municipality: Prigorodnoye Rural Settlement

Population (2010)
  - Total: 11
- Time zone: UTC+3
- Postal code: 152880

Vasilkovo (Russian: Васильково) is a village in the Poshekhonsky District of the Yaroslavl Oblast of Russia.

== Geography ==
The village is located in the Northern area of Yaroslavl Oblast on the bank of the Sogozha. The village is 6 kilometres northeast of Poshekhonye, 2 kilometres southwest of Turovo, nearly 2 kilometres southeast of Tolstoukhovo, and nearly a kilometre northeast of Ubozhyevo.

The village is in the Moscow Time (UTC+3).

== History ==
An 1861 document says there were 8 houses with 23 men and 25 women.

== Population ==
There were 48 residents in 1861.

According to the 2002 Russian census, there were 14 residents of the village, all being Russians.

The population of the village was 17 in 2007, but decreased to 11 in 2010.
