= Bolshie Yamy =

Village in Yaroslavl Oblast, Russia

Bolshie Yamy Большие Ямы
- Village
- Interactive map of Bolshie Yamy
- Country: Russia
- Oblast: Yaroslavl Oblast
- District: Poshekhonsky District
- Municipality: Prigorodnoye Rural Settlement

Population (2010)
  - Total: 14
- Time zone: UTC+3
- Postal code: 152850

Bolshie Yamy Russian: Большие Ямы is a village in the Poshekhonsky District of the Yaroslavl Oblast of Russia. The village is located opposite the Pechevka from Malye Yamy.

== Geography ==
The village is located in the Northern area of Yaroslavl Oblast on the bank of the Sogozha, at the confluence of the Pechevka. The village is 1 kilometre west of Poshekhonye, just over half a kilometre southeast of Knyazevo, and 1 kilometre south of Panovo.

The village is in the Moscow Time (UTC+3).

== Population ==
According to the 2002 Russian census, there were 12 residents of the village, all being Russians.

The population of the village was 13 in 2007, and increased to 14 in 2010.
