= Ivkino =

Village in Yaroslavl Oblast, Russia

Ivkino Ивкино
- Village
- Interactive map of Ivkino
- Country: Russia
- Oblast: Yaroslavl Oblast
- District: Poshekhonsky District
- Municipality: Prigorodnoye Rural Settlement

Population (2026 estimate)
  - Total: 0
- Time zone: UTC+3
- Postal code: 152850

Ivkino (Russian: Ивкино) is an abandoned village in the Poshekhonsky District of the Yaroslavl Oblast of Russia.

== Geography ==
The village is located in the Northern area of Yaroslavl Oblast on the bank of the Pechevka. The village is 5.7 kilometres northwest of Poshekhonye, 1.5 kilometres northeast of Poddubka, and 1.8 kilometres south of Zayma-Soboleva.

The village is in the Moscow Time (UTC+3).

== History ==
An 1861 document says there were 2 houses with 4 men and 4 women.

== Population ==
There were 8 residents in 1861, but the village is now abandoned.
