= Zelenino =

Village in Yaroslavl Oblast, Russia

Zelenino Зеленино
- Village
- Interactive map of Zelenino
- Country: Russia
- Oblast: Yaroslavl Oblast
- District: Poshekhonsky District
- Municipality: Prigorodnoye Rural Settlement

Population (2026 Estimate)
  - Total: 0
- Time zone: UTC+3
- Postal code: 152850

Zelenino (Russian: Зеленино) is a depopulated village in the Poshekhonsky District of the Yaroslavl Oblast of Russia.

== Geography ==
The village is located in the Northern area of Yaroslavl Oblast on the bank of the Paranilov stream. The village is 3.5 kilometres north of Poshekhonye, 1.2 kilometres northwest from Tsykunino, and 1.6 kilometres southwest of Yekimovskiye.

The village is in the Moscow Time (UTC+3).

== Population ==
An 1861 document says there were 16 houses with 44 males and 56 females.

The village is shown on a 1990 Soviet map.

The village was abandoned and has a population of 0.
