= Malye Yamy =

Village in Yaroslavl Oblast, Russia

Malye Yamy Малые Ямы
- Village
- Interactive map of Malye Yamy
- Country: Russia
- Oblast: Yaroslavl Oblast
- District: Poshekhonsky District
- Municipality: Prigorodnoye Rural Settlement

Population (2010)
  - Total: 7
- Time zone: UTC+3
- Postal code: 152850

Malye Yamy Russian: Малые Ямы is a village in the Poshekhonsky District of the Yaroslavl Oblast of Russia. The village is located opposite the Pechevka from Bolshie Yamy.

== Geography ==
The village is located in the Northern area of Yaroslavl Oblast on the bank of the Sogozha, at the confluence of the Pechevka. The village is 1 kilometre west of Poshekhonye, just over half a kilometre South of Knyazevo, and one and a half kilometres Northeast of Korsa.

The village is in the Moscow Time (UTC+3).

== Population ==
According to the 2002 Russian census, there were 9 residents of the village, all being Russians.

The population of the village was 10 in 2007, but declined to 7 2010.
