= Anninskoye, Yaroslavl Oblast =

Village in Yaroslavl Oblast, Russia

Anninskoye Аннинское
- Village
- Interactive map of Anninskoye
- Country: Russia
- Oblast: Yaroslavl Oblast
- District: Poshekhonsky District
- Municipality: Prigorodnoye Rural Settlement

Population (2026 Estimate)
  - Total: 0
- Time zone: UTC+3
- Postal code: 152850

Anninskoye (Russian: Аннинское) is a depopulated village in the Poshekhonsky District of the Yaroslavl Oblast of Russia.

== Geography ==
The village is located in the Northern area of Yaroslavl Oblast on the bank of the Shelsha River. The village is 1.7 kilometres north of Poshekhonye, 1.1 kilometres northwest from Vysokovo, and 1.3 kilometres southwest of Timoshino.

The village is in the Moscow Time (UTC+3).

== Population ==
An 1861 document says there was 1 house with 16 males and 19 females.

The village is shown on a 1990 Soviet map.

The village was abandoned and has a population of 0.
