= Agafonkovo =

Village in Yaroslavl Oblast, Russia

Agafonkovo Агафонково
- Village
- Interactive map of Agafonkovo
- Country: Russia
- Oblast: Yaroslavl Oblast
- District: Poshekhonsky District
- Municipality: Prigorodnoye Rural Settlement

Population (2010)
  - Total: 7
- Time zone: UTC+3
- Postal code: 152850

Agafonkovo (Russian: Агафонково) is a village in the Poshekhonsky District of the Yaroslavl Oblast of Russia.

== Geography ==
The village is located in the Northern area of Yaroslavl Oblast. The village is 9 kilometres northeast of Poshekhonye and 1.7 kilometres northeast of Tolstoukhovo.

The village is in the Moscow Time (UTC+3).

== History ==
An 1861 document says there were 9 houses with 37 men and 34 women.

== Population ==
According to the 2002 Russian census, there were 9 residents of the village, all being Russians.

The population of the village was 10 in 2007, but decreased to 7 in 2010.
