= Penkovo, Yaroslavl Oblast =

Village in Yaroslavl Oblast, Russia

Penkovo Пеньково
- Village
- Interactive map of Penkovo
- Country: Russia
- Oblast: Yaroslavl Oblast
- District: Poshekhonsky District
- Municipality: Prigorodnoye Rural Settlement

Population (2010)
  - Total: 19
- Time zone: UTC+3
- Postal code: 152850

Penkovo (Russian: Пеньково) is a village in the Poshekhonsky District of the Yaroslavl Oblast of Russia. The village is adjacent to Knyazevo.

== Geography ==
The village is located in the Northern area of Yaroslavl Oblast, 2 kilometres Northwest of Poshekhonye and 1 kilometre Northeast of Novinki and Korsa.

The village is in the Moscow Time (UTC+3).

== Population ==
An 1861 document says there were 22 houses, with 58 males and 61 females.

According to the 2002 Russian census, there were 48 residents, with 83% being Russian.

The population of the village was 28 in 2007, and declined to 19 in 2010.
