= Vladychnoe =

Village in Yaroslavl Oblast, Russia

Vladychnoe Владычное
- Village
- Interactive map of Vladychnoe
- Country: Russia
- Oblast: Yaroslavl Oblast
- District: Poshekhonsky District
- Municipality: Prigorodnoye Rural Settlement

Population (2010)
  - Total: 247
- Time zone: UTC+3
- Postal code: 152890
- Area code: +7 48546

Vladychnoe Russian: Владычное is a village in the Poshekhonsky District of the Yaroslavl Oblast of Russia.

There is a house of culture, a kindergarten, a clinic, a post office, and a grocery store in the village, as well as a monument to the Great Patriotic War.

== Geography ==
The village is located in the Northern area of Yaroslavl Oblast near the bank of the Nosa River across from Shiryayka. The village is 40 kilometres Northeast of Poshekhonye.

The village is in the Moscow Time (UTC+3).

== History ==
The village church of the Blessed Virgin Mary, dedicated to St. Nicholas the Wonderworker, was built in 1811 and was paid for by the parishioners. The church had two altars.

The village was the centre of the Sokolovskaya Volost of the Poshekhonsky District during the Late 19th and Early 20th centuries.

Between 1929 and 1946, the village was part of the Pervomaysky District, before becoming the centre of the Vladychensky District on 15 April 1946, until the district was merged into Poshekhonsky on 22 November 1957.

Between 2006 and 2009, the village was the centre of the Vladychensky Rural Settlement.

The wooden Church of the Assumption of the Blessed Virgin Mary was built in 1993.

== Transportation ==
There is a bus service No 112 to Poshekhonsky.

== Population ==
The population of the village in 1859 was 205.

According to the 2002 Russian census, there were 319 residents of the village, with 99% being Russians. The population declined to 300 in 2007, and to 247 in 2010.
