= Tsykunino =

Village in Yaroslavl Oblast, Russia

Tsykunino Цыкунино
- Village
- Interactive map of Tsykunino
- Country: Russia
- Oblast: Yaroslavl Oblast
- District: Poshekhonsky District
- Municipality: Prigorodnoye Rural Settlement

Population (2010)
  - Total: 0
- Time zone: UTC+3
- Postal code: 152850

Tsykunino Russian: Цыкунино is an abandoned village in the Poshekhonsky District of the Yaroslavl Oblast of Russia.

== History ==
The village is shown on Schubert's map 1863.

An 1861 document says there were 15 homes with 37 men and 51 women.

== Geography ==
The village is located in the Northern area of Yaroslavl Oblast on the bank of the Pechevka. The village is 3 kilometres north of Poshekhonye, half a kilometre northeast of Artyukovo, and 1.7 kilometres northwest of Zheludkovo.

The village is in the Moscow Time (UTC+3).

== Population ==
The population of the village was 0 in 2007 and 2010.
