= Panovo, Yaroslavl Oblast =

Village in Yaroslavl Oblast, Russia

Panovo Паново
- Village
- Interactive map of Panovo
- Country: Russia
- Oblast: Yaroslavl Oblast
- District: Poshekhonsky District
- Municipality: Prigorodnoye Rural Settlement

Population (2010)
  - Total: 0
- Time zone: UTC+3
- Postal code: 152850

Panovo (Russian: Паново) is a depopulated village in the Poshekhonsky District of the Yaroslavl Oblast of Russia.

== Geography ==
The village is located in the Northern area of Yaroslavl Oblast on the bank of the Pechevka. The village is 1 kilometre northwest of Poshekhonye, half a kilometre east of Knyazevo, 1 kilometre southeast of Bosharovo, and 1 kilometre north of Bolshie Yamy.

The village is in the Moscow Time (UTC+3).

== Population ==
An 1861 document says there were 13 houses, with 49 males and 54 females.

According to the 2002 Russian census, there were 9 residents of the village, all being Russians.

The population of the village was 4 in 2007, but decreased to 0 in 2010.
