= Zhelonka =

Village in Yaroslavl Oblast, Russia

Zhelonka Желонка
- Village
- Interactive map of Zhelonka
- Country: Russia
- Oblast: Yaroslavl Oblast
- District: Poshekhonsky District
- Municipality: Prigorodnoye Rural Settlement

Population (2010)
  - Total: 7
- Time zone: UTC+3
- Postal code: 152890

Zhelonka Russian: Желонка is a village in the Poshekhonsky District of the Yaroslavl Oblast of Russia.

== Geography ==
The village is located in the Northern area of Yaroslavl Oblast on the bank of the Nosa River. The village is 35 kilometres Northeast of Poshekhonye.

The village is in the Moscow Time (UTC+3).

== Population ==
According to the 2002 Russian census, there were 19 residents of the village, all being Russians. The population declined to 13 in 2007, and to 7 in 2010.
