= Novinki, Yaroslavl Oblast =

Village in Yaroslavl Oblast, Russia

Novinki Новинки
- Village
- Interactive map of Novinki
- Country: Russia
- Oblast: Yaroslavl Oblast
- District: Poshekhonsky District
- Municipality: Prigorodnoye Rural Settlement

Population (2010)
  - Total: 0
- Time zone: UTC+3
- Postal code: 152850

Novinki Russian: Новинки is a depopulated village in the Poshekhonsky District of the Yaroslavl Oblast of Russia.

== Geography ==
The village is located in the Northern area of Yaroslavl Oblast on the bank of the Korsitsa River. The village is 3 kilometres west of Poshekhonye, 1 kilometre Southwest of Penkovo, and just over half a kilometre from Korsa.

The village is in the Moscow Time (UTC+3).

== Population ==
An 1861 document says there were 10 houses with 22 men and 29 women.

According to the 2002 Russian census, there were 2 residents, both being Russian.

The population of the village was 0 in 2007 and 2010.
