= Bosharovo =

Village in Yaroslavl Oblast, Russia

Bosharovo Бошарово
- Village
- Interactive map of Bosharovo
- Country: Russia
- Oblast: Yaroslavl Oblast
- District: Poshekhonsky District
- Municipality: Prigorodnoye Rural Settlement
- Elevation: 126 m (413 ft)

Population (2010)
  - Total: 3
- Time zone: UTC+3
- Postal code: 152850

Bosharovo Russian: Бошарово is a village in the Poshekhonsky District of the Yaroslavl Oblast of Russia.

== Geography ==
The village is located in the Northern area of Yaroslavl Oblast near the bank of the Pechevka. The village is 2 kilometres northwest of Poshekhonye, 1 kilometre northeast of Knyazevo, and 1 kilometre northwest of Panovo.

The village is in the Moscow Time (UTC+3).

== History ==
An 1861 document says there were 10 houses with 25 men and 37 women.

== Population ==
According to the 2002 Russian census, there were 9 residents of the village, all being Russians.

The population of the village was 5 in 2007, but decreased to 3 in 2010.
