= Zayma-Novaya =

Village in Yaroslavl Oblast, Russia

Zayma-Novaya Займа-Новая
- Village
- Interactive map of Zayma-Novaya
- Country: Russia
- Oblast: Yaroslavl Oblast
- District: Poshekhonsky District
- Municipality: Prigorodnoye Rural Settlement

Population (2010)
  - Total: 0
- Time zone: UTC+3
- Postal code: 152880

Zayma-Novaya Russian: Займа-Новая is a village in the Poshekhonsky District of the Yaroslavl Oblast of Russia.

== Geography ==
The village is located in the Northern area of Yaroslavl Oblast on the bank of the Pechevka. The village is 7 kilometres northwest of Poshekhonye, 1 kilometre northwest of Petrovskoye, and southwest of Ezhovo, and 1.2 kilometres northeast of Zayma-Soboleva.

The village is in the Moscow Time (UTC+3).

== Population ==
The population of the village was 0 in 2007 and 2010.
