= Svinarikha =

Village in Yaroslavl Oblast, Russia

Svinarikha Свинариха
- Village
- Interactive map of Svinarikha
- Country: Russia
- Oblast: Yaroslavl Oblast
- District: Poshekhonsky District
- Municipality: Prigorodnoye Rural Settlement

Population (2010)
  - Total: 0
- Time zone: UTC+3
- Postal code: 152850

Svinarikha (Russian: Свинариха) is a depopulated village in the Poshekhonsky District of the Yaroslavl Oblast of Russia.

The village is legally registered as a Village in official administrative Russian sources such as OKATO and OKTMO.

== History ==
An 1861 document says that the village had 16 houses, 39 males, and 53 females living there.

Two men of the village died during the Great Patriotic War: Fedor Ivanovich Kulikov in 1942 and Ivan Arsenevich Nikitin in 1943.

== Geography ==
The village is located in the Northern area of Yaroslavl Oblast, just south and west of the Shelsha River, and is located 3.3 km (2.1 mi) from the source of the Pechevka. The village is 13 kilometres North of Poshekhonye.

The village is in the Moscow Time (UTC+3).

== Population ==
The population of the village was 0 in 2007 and 2010.
