= Poddubka =

Village in Yaroslavl Oblast, Russia

Poddubka Поддубка
- Village
- Interactive map of Poddubka
- Country: Russia
- Oblast: Yaroslavl Oblast
- District: Poshekhonsky District
- Municipality: Prigorodnoye Rural Settlement

Population (2026 (Estimate))
  - Total: 0
- Time zone: UTC+3
- Postal code: 152850

Poddubka (Russian: Поддубка) is an abandoned village in the Poshekhonsky District of the Yaroslavl Oblast of Russia.

== Geography ==
The village is located in the Northern area of Yaroslavl Oblast, 4.5 kilometres northwest of Poshekhonye, half a kilometre east of Fominka, and 2.5 kilometres northwest of Knyazevo.

The village is in the Moscow Time (UTC+3).

== Population ==
An 1861 document says there was 9 houses, with 23 men and 23 women.

The village was abandoned in more recent times.
