= Onosovo =

Village in Yaroslavl Oblast, Russia

Onosovo Оносово
- Village
- Interactive map of Onosovo
- Country: Russia
- Oblast: Yaroslavl Oblast
- District: Pervomaysky District
- Municipality: Kukoboyskoye Rural Settlement

Population (2010)
  - Total: 76
- Time zone: UTC+3
- Postal code: 152457
- Area code: +7 48549

Onosovo Russian: Оносово is a village in the Pervomaysky District of the Yaroslavl Oblast of Russia.

The village has a library and a club, which have been operating since 1980, although the building was built in 1972.

The village has two main streets: Molodyozhnaya and Tsentralnaya.

== Geography ==
The village is located in the Northern area of Yaroslavl Oblast on the bank of the Nosa River. The village is 55 kilometres Northwest of Prechistoye. The village is located at 160 metres (520 ft) above sea level.

The village is in the Moscow Time (UTC+3).

== Population ==
The population of the village was 78 in 2007, but declined to 76 in 2010.
