= Fominka, Yaroslavl Oblast =

Village in Yaroslavl Oblast, Russia

Fominka Фоминка
- Village
- Interactive map of Fominka
- Country: Russia
- Oblast: Yaroslavl Oblast
- District: Poshekhonsky District
- Municipality: Prigorodnoye Rural Settlement

Population (2026 Estimate)
  - Total: 0
- Time zone: UTC+3
- Postal code: 152850

Fominka (Russian: Фоминка) is an abandoned village in the Poshekhonsky District of the Yaroslavl Oblast of Russia.

== Geography ==
The village is located in the Northern area of Yaroslavl Oblast, 5.3 kilometres northwest of Poshekhonye, half a kilometre west of Poddubka, and 2 kilometres northeast of Avdeyevo.

The village is in the Moscow Time (UTC+3).

== Population ==
An 1861 document says there was 10 houses, with 30 men and 33 women.

The village was abandoned in more recent times.
