= Branikha =

Village in Yaroslavl Oblast, Russia

Branikha Браниха
- Village
- Interactive map of Branikha
- Country: Russia
- Oblast: Yaroslavl Oblast
- District: Poshekhonsky District
- Municipality: Prigorodnoye Rural Settlement

Population (2010)
  - Total: 5
- Time zone: UTC+3
- Postal code: 152890

Branikha Russian: Браниха is a village in the Poshekhonsky District of the Yaroslavl Oblast of Russia.

== Geography ==
The village is located in the Northern area of Yaroslavl Oblast near the bank of the Nosa River. The village is 37 kilometres Northeast of Poshekhonye.

The village is in the Moscow Time zone (UTC+3).

== Population ==
According to the 2002 Russian census, 14 people lived in the village, with them all being of Russian nationality. By 2007 there were 9 residents, and by 2010, there were 5.
