= Avdeyevo, Yaroslavl Oblast =

Village in Yaroslavl Oblast, Russia

Avdeyevo Авдеево
- Village
- Interactive map of Avdeyevo
- Country: Russia
- Oblast: Yaroslavl Oblast
- District: Poshekhonsky District
- Municipality: Prigorodnoye Rural Settlement

Population (2010)
  - Total: 0
- Time zone: UTC+3
- Postal code: 152850

Avdeyevo (Russian: Авдеево) is a depopulated village in the Poshekhonsky District of the Yaroslavl Oblast of Russia.

== Geography ==
The village is located in the Northern area of Yaroslavl Oblast on the bank of the Korsitsa River. The village is 5 kilometres northwest of Poshekhonye and 2 kilometres southwest of Fominka.

The village is in the Moscow Time (UTC+3).

== Population ==
An 1861 document says there were 23 houses with 59 males and 87 females.

The population of the village was 0 in 2007 and 2010.
