= Muzhikovo =

Village in Yaroslavl Oblast, Russia

Muzhikovo Мужиково
- Village
- Interactive map of Muzhikovo
- Country: Russia
- Oblast: Yaroslavl Oblast
- District: Poshekhonsky District
- Municipality: Prigorodnoye Rural Settlement

Population (2010)
  - Total: 21
- Time zone: UTC+3
- Postal code: 152850

Muzhikovo Russian: Мужиково is a village in the Poshekhonsky District of the Yaroslavl Oblast of Russia.

== Geography ==
The village is located in the Northern area of Yaroslavl Oblast on the confluence of the Pechevka and the Shelsha. The village is adjacent to the town of Poshekhonye, and the dacha settlement of Shishelovo, and half a kilometre southwest of Zheludkovo.

The village is in the Moscow Time (UTC+3).

== Population ==
An 1861 document says there was 1 house, with 10 men and 13 women.

According to the 2002 Russian census, there were 30 residents of the village, all being Russians.

The population of the village was 25 in 2007, but decreased to 21 in 2010.

== Transport ==
The village is served by buses №1 Yasnaya Polyana-Vysokovo, №105 Poshekhonye-Andryushino, №112 Poshekhonye-Larionovo, and №120 Poshekhonye-Spas
