= Shiryayka =

Village in Yaroslavl Oblast, Russia

Shiryayka Ширяайка
- Village
- Interactive map of Shiryayka
- Country: Russia
- Oblast: Yaroslavl Oblast
- District: Poshekhonsky District
- Municipality: Prigorodnoye Rural Settlement

Population (2010)
  - Total: 9
- Time zone: UTC+3
- Postal code: 152890

Shiryayka Russian: Ширяайка is a village in the Poshekhonsky District of the Yaroslavl Oblast of Russia.

== Geography ==
The village is located in the Northern area of Yaroslavl Oblast on the bank of the Nosa River across from Vladychnoe. The village is 39 kilometres Northeast of Poshekhonye.

The village is in the Moscow Time (UTC+3).

== Population ==
According to the 2002 Russian census, there were 11 residents of the village, all being Russians. The population rose to 13 in 2007, but declined to 9 in 2010.
