= Petrovskoye, Poshekhonsky District, Yaroslavl Oblast =

Village in Yaroslavl Oblast, Russia

Petrovskoye Петровское
- Village
- Interactive map of Petrovskoye
- Country: Russia
- Oblast: Yaroslavl Oblast
- District: Poshekhonsky District
- Municipality: Prigorodnoye Rural Settlement
- Elevation: 138 m (453 ft)

Population (2010)
  - Total: 0
- Time zone: UTC+3
- Postal code: 152880

Petrovskoye Russian: Петровское is a depopulated village in the Poshekhonsky District of the Yaroslavl Oblast of Russia.

== Geography ==
The village is located in the Northern area of Yaroslavl Oblast, 6 kilometres North of Poshekhonye, and a kilometre south of Ezhovo, and southeast of Zayma-Novaya.

The village is in the Moscow Time (UTC+3).

== Population ==
According to the 2002 Russian census, there were 5 residents of the village, all being Russians.

The population of the village increased to 13 in 2007, but decreased to 0 in 2010.
