= Vyazovka, Yaroslavl Oblast =

Village in Yaroslavl Oblast, Russia

Vyazovka Вязовка
- Village
- Interactive map of Vyazovka
- Country: Russia
- Oblast: Yaroslavl Oblast
- District: Pervomaysky District
- Municipality: Kukoboyskoye Rural Settlement

Population (2010)
  - Total: 10
- Time zone: UTC+3
- Postal code: 152457

Vyazovka Russian: Вязовка is a village in the Pervomaysky District of the Yaroslavl Oblast of Russia.

== Geography ==
The village is located in the Northern area of Yaroslavl Oblast near the source of the Nosa River. The village is 52 kilometres Northwest of Prechistoye.

The village is in the Moscow Time (UTC+3).

== Population ==
According to the 2002 Russian census, there were 17 residents, all being Russians. The population declined to 11 in 2007 and 10 in 2010.
