= Baluiki =

Village in Yaroslavl Oblast, Russia

Baluiki Балуйки
- Village
- Interactive map of Baluiki
- Country: Russia
- Oblast: Yaroslavl Oblast
- District: Pervomaysky District
- Municipality: Kukoboyskoye Rural Settlement

Population (2010)
  - Total: 4
- Time zone: UTC+3
- Postal code: 152890

Baluiki Russian: Балуйки is a village in the Pervomaysky District of the Yaroslavl Oblast of Russia.

== Geography ==
The village is located in the Northern area of Yaroslavl Oblast on the bank of the Nosa River. The village is 56 kilometres Northwest of Prechistoye.

The village is in the Moscow Time (UTC+3).

== Population ==
According to the 2002 Russian census, there were 8 residents of the village, all being Russians. The population remained at 8 in 2007, but declined to 4 in 2010.
