= Artyukovo =

Village in Yaroslavl Oblast, Russia

Artyukovo Артюково
- Village
- Interactive map of Artyukovo
- Country: Russia
- Oblast: Yaroslavl Oblast
- District: Poshekhonsky District
- Municipality: Prigorodnoye Rural Settlement
- Elevation: 124 m (407 ft)

Population (2010)
  - Total: 0
- Time zone: UTC+3
- Postal code: 152880

Artyukovo Russian: Артюково is an abandoned village in the Poshekhonsky District of the Yaroslavl Oblast of Russia.

== Geography ==
The village is located in the Northern area of Yaroslavl Oblast on the bank of the Pechevka. The village is 2 kilometres north of Poshekhonye, and 1.3 kilometres northwest of Zheludkovo.

The village is in the Moscow Time (UTC+3).

== History ==
There were two churches in the village. One was dedicated to the Ascension of the Lord and Our Lady of Kazan, and was wooden, and was built in 1750, and restored in 1897. This church had two altars. The other was a stone church dedicated to St. Sergius of Radonezh the Wonderworker, and St. Nicholas the Wonderworker, built in 1790. There was also a school.

During the Late 19th and Early 20th Century, the village was part of the Poshekhonskaya Volost.

The village has been part of the Knyazevsky Selsoviet since 1929, and since January 2005, the Prigorodnoye Rural Settlement.

== Population ==
The population of the village was 61 in 1859., and was 55 in 1908.

An 1861 document says there were 4 homes, with 16 men and 26 women.

The population of the village was 0 in 2002, 2007 and 2010.
