= Korsa, Yaroslavl Oblast =

Village in Yaroslavl Oblast, Russia

Korsa Корса
- Village
- Interactive map of Korsa
- Country: Russia
- Oblast: Yaroslavl Oblast
- District: Poshekhonsky District
- Municipality: Prigorodnoye Rural Settlement

Population (2010)
  - Total: 3
- Time zone: UTC+3
- Postal code: 152850

Korsa (Russian: Корса) is a village in the Poshekhonsky District of the Yaroslavl Oblast of Russia.

== Geography ==
The village is located in the Northern area of Yaroslavl Oblast on the confluence of the Korsitsa River and the Sogozha River. The village is 3 kilometres west of Poshekhonye, just over half a kilometre south of Novinki, and one and a half kilometres southwest of Malye Yamy.

.The village is in the Moscow Time (UTC+3).

== Population ==
An 1861 document says there was 13 houses, with 52 males and 52 females.

According to the 2002 Russian census, there were 11 residents, all being Russian.

The population of the village was 5 in 2007, and declined to 3 in 2010.
