= Yekimovskiye =

Village in Yaroslavl Oblast, Russia

Yekimovskiye Екимовские
- Village
- Interactive map of Yekimovskiye
- Country: Russia
- Oblast: Yaroslavl Oblast
- District: Poshekhonsky District
- Municipality: Prigorodnoye Rural Settlement

Population (2010)
  - Total: 0
- Time zone: UTC+3
- Postal code: 152850

Yekimovskiye (Russian: Екимовские) is a depopulated village in the Poshekhonsky District of the Yaroslavl Oblast of Russia.

== Geography ==
The village is located in the Northern area of Yaroslavl Oblast on the bank of the Shelsha River. The village is 4 kilometres northeast of Poshekhonye, and just under half a kilometre northwest from Timoshino.

The village is in the Moscow Time (UTC+3).

== Population ==
The population of the village was 0 in 2007 and 2010.
