= Timoshino, Poshekhonsky District, Yaroslavl Oblast =

Village in Yaroslavl Oblast, Russia

Timoshino Тимошино
- Village
- Interactive map of Timoshino
- Country: Russia
- Oblast: Yaroslavl Oblast
- District: Poshekhonsky District
- Municipality: Prigorodnoye Rural Settlement
- Elevation: 126 m (413 ft)

Population (2010)
  - Total: 4
- Time zone: UTC+3
- Postal code: 152850

Timoshino (Russian: Тимошино) is a village in the Poshekhonsky District of the Yaroslavl Oblast of Russia.

== History ==
The village is shown on the 1860 Mende's map of Russia.

== Geography ==
The village is located in the Northern area of Yaroslavl Oblast on bank of the Shelsha. The village is 4 kilometres northeast of Poshekhonye, 2.5 kilometres northeast of Vysokovo, 2.1 kilometres southwest of Tolstoukhovo, 1.6 kilometres west of Ubozhyevo, and just under half a kilometre southeast of Yekimovskiye.

The village is in the Moscow Time (UTC+3).

== Population ==
According to the 2002 Russian census, there were 6 residents of the village, all being Russians.

The population of the village was 9 in 2007, but decreased to 4 in 2010.

== Transport ==
The village is served by buses №105 Poshekhonye-Andryushino, №112 Poshekhonye-Larionovo, and №120 Poshekhonye-Spas
