= Zayma-Soboleva =

Village in Yaroslavl Oblast, Russia

Zayma-Soboleva Займа-Соболева
- Village
- Interactive map of Zayma-Soboleva
- Country: Russia
- Oblast: Yaroslavl Oblast
- District: Poshekhonsky District
- Municipality: Prigorodnoye Rural Settlement

Population (2010)
  - Total: 0
- Time zone: UTC+3
- Postal code: 152880

Zayma-Soboleva Russian: Займа-Соболева is an abandoned village in the Poshekhonsky District of the Yaroslavl Oblast of Russia.

== Geography ==
The village is located in the Northern area of Yaroslavl Oblast, 7 kilometres northwest of Poshekhonye, and 1.2 kilometres southwest of Zayma-Novaya.

The village is in the Moscow Time (UTC+3).

== Population ==
The population of the village was 0 in 2007, and 2010.
