= Medvedka (disambiguation) =

Medvedka is an urban settlement in Perm Krai, Russia.

Medvedka may also refer to:

- Medvedka (Moskva tributary), river in Russia
- Medvedka, Yaroslavl Oblast – Village in Yaroslavl Oblast, Russia
- RPK-9 Medvedka – Russian anti-submarine missile
