= Tolstoukhovo =

Village in Yaroslavl Oblast, Russia

Tolstoukhovo Толстоухово
- Village
- Interactive map of Tolstoukhovo
- Country: Russia
- Oblast: Yaroslavl Oblast
- District: Poshekhonsky District
- Municipality: Prigorodnoye Rural Settlement

Population (2010)
  - Total: 10
- Time zone: UTC+3
- Postal code: 152880

Tolstoukhovo (Russian: Толстоухово) is a village in the Poshekhonsky District of the Yaroslavl Oblast of Russia.

== Geography ==
The village is located in the Northern area of Yaroslavl Oblast on the bank of the Shelsha River. The village is 7 kilometres northeast of Poshekhonye, nearly 2 kilometres northwest of Vasilkovo, and 2 kilometres northeast of Timoshino.

The village is in the Moscow Time (UTC+3).

== History ==
An 1861 document says there were 9 houses with 23 men and 32 women.

== Population ==
There were 55 residents in 1861.

According to the 2002 Russian census, there were 30 residents of the village, with 83% being Russians.

The population of the village was 32 in 2007, but decreased to 10 in 2010.
