= Medvedka, Yaroslavl Oblast =

Village in Yaroslavl Oblast, Russia

Medvedka Медведка
- Village
- Interactive map of Medvedka
- Country: Russia
- Oblast: Yaroslavl Oblast
- District: Poshekhonsky District
- Municipality: Prigorodnoye Rural Settlement

Population (2010)
  - Total: 1
- Time zone: UTC+3
- Postal code: 152890

Medvedka (Russian: Медведка) is a village in the Poshekhonsky District of the Yaroslavl Oblast of Russia.

== Geography ==
The village is located in the Northern area of Yaroslavl Oblast on the banks of the Nosa River. The village is located 37 kilometres Northeast of Poshekhonye.

Time Zone

The village is situated in the Moscow Time, and is at UTC+3.

== Population ==
In 2002, 12 people lived in the village, all were Russian.

In 2007, 4 people lived in the village, but by 2010 only 1 person remained in the village.
