= Ubozhyevo =

Village in Yaroslavl Oblast, Russia

Ubozhyevo Убожьево
- Village
- Interactive map of Ubozhyevo
- Country: Russia
- Oblast: Yaroslavl Oblast
- District: Poshekhonsky District
- Municipality: Prigorodnoye Rural Settlement

Population (2010)
  - Total: 0
- Time zone: UTC+3
- Postal code: 152850

Ubozhyevo (Russian: Убожьево) is an abandoned village in the Poshekhonsky District of the Yaroslavl Oblast of Russia.

== Geography ==
The village is located in the northern area of Yaroslavl Oblast on the bank of the Mozha. Ubozhyevo is 1.6 kilometres east of Timoshino, and 5 kilometres northeast of Poshekhonye.

The village is in the Moscow Time (UTC+3).

== History ==
An 1861 document says there were 11 houses, with 43 men and 42 women.

== Population ==
The population of Ubozhyevo was 85 in 1861, 1 in 2007 and 0 in 2010.
