= Prechisty =

Prechisty (Russian: Пречистый; masculine), Prechistaya (Пречистая; feminine), or Prechistoye (Пречистое; neuter) is the name of several inhabited localities in Russia.

== Urban localities ==
- Prechistoye, Pervomaysky District, Yaroslavl Oblast, a work settlement in Pervomaysky District of Yaroslavl Oblast

== Rural localities ==
- Prechistoye, Kaluga Oblast, a village in Yukhnovsky District of Kaluga Oblast
- Prechistoye, Kostroma Oblast, a village in Sidorovskoye Settlement of Krasnoselsky District of Kostroma Oblast
- Prechistoye, Moscow Oblast, a village in Novopetrovskoye Rural Settlement of Istrinsky District of Moscow Oblast
- Prechistoye, Dukhovshchinsky District, Smolensk Oblast, a selo in Prechistenskoye Rural Settlement of Dukhovshchinsky District of Smolensk Oblast
- Prechistoye, Gagarinsky District, Smolensk Oblast, a selo in Prechistenskoye Rural Settlement of Gagarinsky District of Smolensk Oblast
- Prechistoye, Vologda Oblast, a village in Nikolsky Selsoviet of Kaduysky District of Vologda Oblast
- Prechistoye, Lyubimsky District, Yaroslavl Oblast, a village in Osetsky Rural Okrug of Lyubimsky District of Yaroslavl Oblast
- Prechistoye, Rostovsky District, Yaroslavl Oblast, a selo in Itlarsky Rural Okrug of Rostovsky District of Yaroslavl Oblast
