= Vysokovo, Poshekhonsky District, Yaroslavl Oblast =

Village in Yaroslavl Oblast, Russia

Vysokovo Высоково
- Village
- Interactive map of Vysokovo
- Country: Russia
- Oblast: Yaroslavl Oblast
- District: Poshekhonsky District
- Municipality: Prigorodnoye Rural Settlement

Population (2010)
  - Total: 0
- Time zone: UTC+3
- Postal code: 152850

Vysokovo (Russian: Высоково) is a depopulated village in the Poshekhonsky District of the Yaroslavl Oblast of Russia.

== History ==
The village is shown on the 1863 Schubert's map of Russia.

== Geography ==
The village is located in the Northern area of Yaroslavl Oblast on bank of the Shelsha. The village is a kilometre northeast of Poshekhonye, and 2.5 kilometres southwest of Timoshino.

The village is in the Moscow Time (UTC+3).

== Population ==
An 1861 document says there were 10 houses, with 26 males and 30 females.

According to the 2002 Russian census, there were 41 residents of the village, all being Russians.

The population of the village was 27 in 2007, but decreased to 0 in 2010.

== Transport ==
The village is served by buses №1 Yasnaya Polyana-Vysokovo, №105 Poshekhonye-Andryushino, №112 Poshekhonye-Larionovo, and №120 Poshekhonye-Spas
