= Belarusian rail bridge in Moscow =

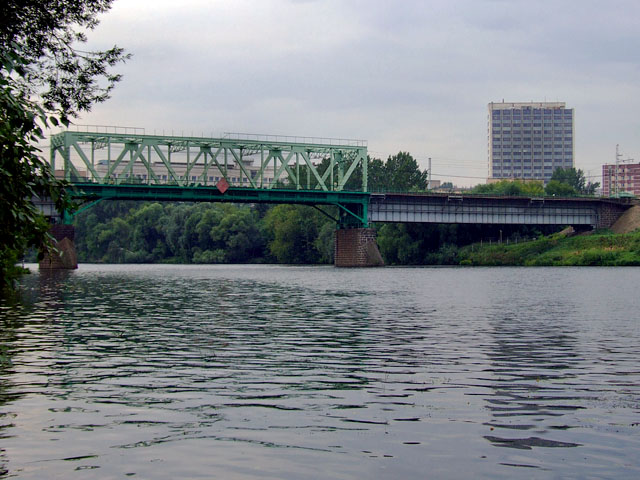
- Coordinates: 55°44′49″N 37°31′19″E
- Carries: double-track
- Crosses: Moscow River
- Locale: Moscow, Russian Federation

Characteristics
- Design: steel, single-span, beam

History
- Opened: 1895

The Belarusian railway bridge (Russian: Филевский) in Moscow is a three-span steel girder bridge over the Moscow River, located on the Belarusian suburban direction of Moscow Railway. It is the outcome of a structure built in 1895, which was renovated twice – in 1938 and 1961.

== History ==
A wooden single-track bridge on the Moscow-Brest railway line was originally built in this spot in 1871, but was replaced with a single-track steel structure in 1875, which had a double-span continuous deck-truss. The structure was 100 metres (330 ft) wide that was not really proper: during floods, the low trusses tended to be inundated, thereby becoming a dam, while the right-bank abutment was almost immediately distorted and cracked.

In 1895, a new double-track bridge was built. Three spans of 55.75 metres (182.9 ft) in length had a total waterway of 160 metres (520 ft), exceeding by more than half the previous structure. Two spans of the bridge were built with the use of the old truss, which was cut in half and strengthened in accordance with the building codes of 1884.

== Renovation ==
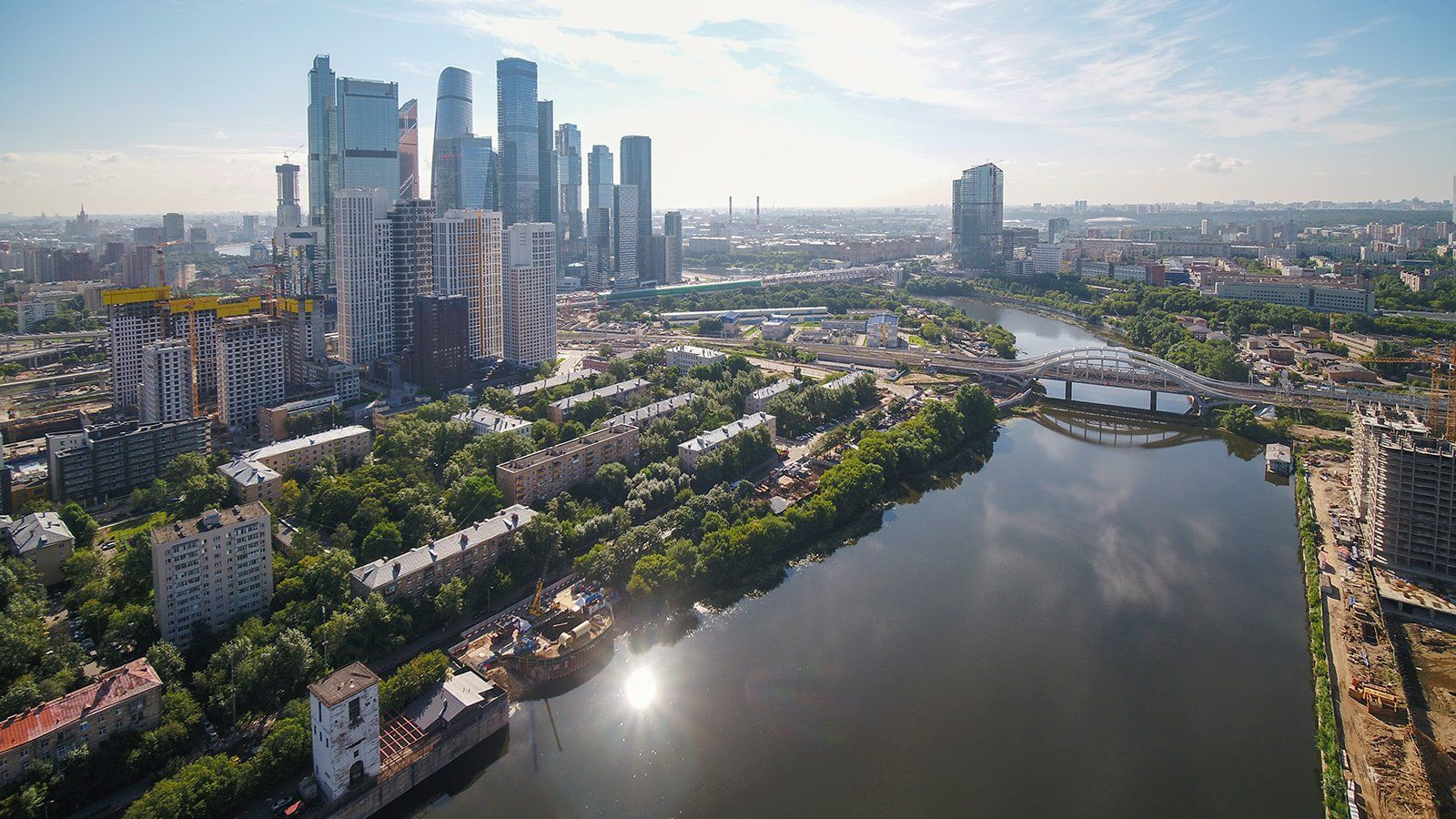
Belarusian rail bridge in August 2020.

As such, the bridge had served prior to the construction of the Moscow Canal. The construction of the channel demanded to increase the dimensions of the bridge for the passage of river vessels. The project that involved a complete replacement of the bridge was rejected in favor of a more cost-effective way to renovate the existing bridge. So, in the mid-span, the deck-truss was replaced with another one of the through-type.

The double-track structure of 1938 has proved to be tenacious and it has served well thus far. The side spans that were established in the 19th century had many manufacturing defects and needed to be replaced in the 1950s. So, in 1961, they were replaced with new steel-reinforced concrete structures. The main criteria for selecting a project and technology was the time for disruption to traffic. The replacing of the four bridge's spans by the method of transverse advancing took no more than 16 hours of traffic disruption.

At present, the Belarusian rail bridge continues to operate, despite its respectable age.
