= Prigorodnoye Rural Settlement =

Rural settlement in Russia

Prigorodnoye Rural Settlement Пригородное сельское поселение
- rural settlement
- Interactive map of Prigorodnoye Rural Settlement
- Prigorodnoye Rural Settlement within Yaroslavl Oblast
- Coordinates: 58°30′05″N 39°07′33″E
- Country: Russia
- Province (Oblast): Yaroslavl Oblast
- District: Poshekhonsky District
- Established: January 1, 2005
- Former seat: Poshekhonye

Government
  - Head of settlement: Vladimir Ivanovich Vasiliev

Area
  - Total: 1,445.80 km^{2} (558.23 sq mi)

Population (2021)
  - Total: 1,850
  - Density: 1.28/km^{2} (3.31/sq mi)
- Time zone: UTC+3

Prigorodnoye Rural Settlement is a Rural settlement in Poshekhonsky District of the Yaroslavl Oblast in central Russia. The Prigorodnoye Rural Settlement contains 212 settlements, and has its administrative centre at Poshekhonye, although the city is not part of the rural settlement.

== Geography ==
The Prigorodnoye Rural Settlement is located in the Northern area of Yaroslavl Oblast, bordering Yugskoye Rural Settlement, Ugolskoye Rural Settlement, Staroselskoye Rural Settlement, Spasskoye Rural Settlement, Yurovskoye Rural Settlement in Vologda Oblast, and Kukoboyskoye Rural Settlement, Beloselskoye Rural Settlement, Kremenevskoye Rural Settlement, and Yermakovskoye Rural Settlement in Yaroslavl Oblast.

== History ==
The Prigorodnoye Rural Settlement was established on January 1, 2005.

The rural settlements of Vladychenskoye and Kolodinskoye were merged into Prigorodnoye in 2009.

== Population ==
2007 - 1942

2010 - 3089

2011 - 3074

2012 - 2976

2013 - 2912

2014 - 2815

2015 - 2778

2016 - 2757

2017 - 2674

2018 - 2578

2019 - 2488

2020 - 2388

2021 - 1850

== List of settlements ==
- Agafonkovo
- Anninskoye
- Anufrievo
- Artyukovo
- Avdeyevo
- Bolshie Yamy
- Bosharovo
- Branikha
- Ezhovo
- Fominka
- Ivkino
- Korsa
- Knyazevo
- Malye Yamy
- Medvedka
- Muzhikovo
- Novinki
- Panovo
- Penkovo
- Petrovskoye
- Poddubka
- Shiryayka
- Svinarikha
- Timoshino
- Tolstoukhovo
- Tsykunino
- Ubozhyevo
- Vladychnoe
- Vysokovo
- Yekimovskiye
- Zayma-Novaya
- Zayma-Soboleva
- Zelenino
- Zhelonka
- Zheludkovo
