= Zheludkovo =

Village in Yaroslavl Oblast, Russia

Zheludkovo Желудково
- Village
- Interactive map of Zheludkovo
- Country: Russia
- Oblast: Yaroslavl Oblast
- District: Poshekhonsky District
- Municipality: Prigorodnoye Rural Settlement

Population (2010)
  - Total: 7
- Time zone: UTC+3
- Postal code: 152850

Zheludkovo Russian: Желудково is a village in the Poshekhonsky District of the Yaroslavl Oblast of Russia.

== History ==
An 1861 document says there were 8 houses with 19 men and 15 women.

== Geography ==
The village is located in the Northern area of Yaroslavl Oblast on the bank of the Shelsha. The village is half a kilometre north of Poshekhonye, and just over half a kilometre northeast of Muzhikovo.

The village is in the Moscow Time (UTC+3).

== Population ==
According to the 2002 Russian census, there were 16 residents of the village, all being Russians.

The population of the village was 13 in 2007, but decreased to 7 in 2010.
