= Purshevo =

Purshevo (Russian: Пуршево) is the name of several rural localities (villages) in Russia:

- Purshevo, Balashikha, Moscow Oblast, a village under the administrative jurisdiction of Balashikha City Under Oblast Jurisdiction in Moscow Oblast
- Purshevo, Mozhaysky District, Moscow Oblast, a village in Klementyevskoye Rural Settlement of Mozhaysky District of Moscow Oblast
- Purshevo, Pskov Oblast, a village in Opochetsky District of Pskov Oblast
- Purshevo, Tver Oblast, a village in Sonkovsky District of Tver Oblast
- Purshevo, Yaroslavl Oblast, a village in Prechistensky Rural Okrug of Pervomaysky District of Yaroslavl Oblast
