= Sasha Kvashenaya =

Russian singer (born 1999)

Sasha Kvashenaya Саша Квашеная
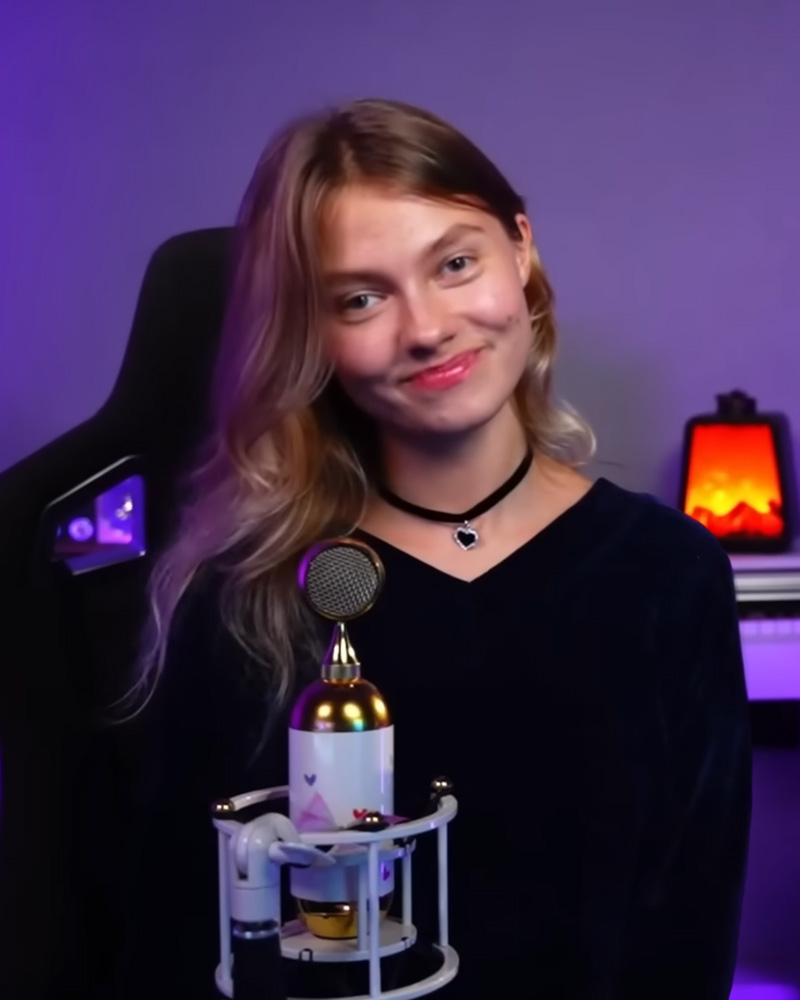
- Sasha Kvashenaya during online streaming (2024)

Background information
- Born: Alexandra Konstantinovna Kapustina; July 29, 1999 (age 27); Prechistoye, Pervomaysky District, Yaroslavl Oblast, Yaroslavl Oblast, Russia
- Genres: Pop, cover artist, rock, folk
- Occupations: singer, streamer, vlogger
- Instruments: Vocals, ukulele
- Years active: 2012–present
- Award: YouTube Gold Button
- Website: YouTube channel

Sasha Kvashenaya (Russian: Cаша Ква́шеная; real name Alexandra Konstantinovna Kapustina, Russian: Алекса́ндра Константи́новна Капу́стина, born 29 July 1999) is a Russian singer, cover artist, streamer, and vlogger. She is known for her YouTube channel featuring covers and live performances of songs in various genres.

== Early life ==
Kvashenaya was born in Prechistoye, Pervomaysky District, Yaroslavl Oblast, Yaroslavl Oblast, Russia. Since early childhood, she studied music, performed at the local House of Culture. She developed her vocal skills under the influence of her mother Olga. At the age of 12, she began posting song covers on VKontakte, and in 2013 she launched her YouTube channel "Саша Квашеная".

The pseudonym "Kvashenaya" can be translated as "sauerkraut" or "pickled". It originates from Sasha's family name "Kapustina" (Капустина) coming from "Kapusta" (Капуста), which is translated as "Cabbage".

In 2017, she graduated from school. In the same year, she moved to Moscow and started hosting music streams.

== Music career ==
At the age of 12, Sasha recorded and published her first cover song with a friend, soon after which she started producing content on YouTube. As of June 2025, Sasha Kvashena's channel had 4.26 million subscribers with 1.35 billion views according to SocialBlade.

In 2014, Sasha won the Kinder Music King All-Russian music competition, performing a song "Follow Me".

Since 2017, Sasha has hosted live music broadcasts on YouTube and Twitch, performing live covers and original songs. She also hosts guest song streams with other musicians. Sasha released her first own song in 2018. The repertoire is based on pop songs, but there are also compositions in rock and folk genres.

In 2020, Sasha's first solo concert was held at the club "Moscow". Since then, she has continued to perform on stage periodically. The second solo concert was performed in the club Urban.

Sasha's song "The Forgotten Radio Wave" was included in the chart of rock music "Chartova Dozen". The song "Breath", released in April 2025, was featured on the cover of the Yandex Music playlist "Bloggers who Sing" and in the top 5 playlist "Folk" VK Music.

In 2025, music critic Alexander Umanchuk positively evaluated Sasha's vocal abilities and her ability to perform compositions in different styles. At the same time, he believes that the expressive manner of Sasha's behavior on streams sometimes borders on overplaying, but helps to keep the audience's attention.

=== Other projects ===
In 2021, Sasha voiced the character Pipp Petals in the Russian version of the animated film My Little Pony: A New Generation.

In 2023, Sasha acted in a Megafon commercial where she performed a musical theme. The video was broadcast on federal TV channels.

In 2024, Sasha conducted a charity music stream to support children with autism as part of the Art to be Close foundation's "Magic is Near" campaign, collecting 225,000 rubles.

== Music records ==
As of May 2026, Sasha has released 23 original songs and 4 collaborative tracks (including two covers).

Original Songs
Year	Song Title
2018	«With Love from the Clouds»
2018	«Marmalade»
2020	«Invisible»
2020	«Night Lullaby»
2020	«Please, Stay»
2020	«Insomnia»
2020	«At the Bottom»
2020	«I Hate Distances»
2021	«Spring»
2021	«Hazy look»
2022	«Loveless»
2023	«The Law of Balance»
2023	«Doubts»
2023	«Everyone Knows»
2023	«Next to You»
2023	«Forgotten Radiowave»
2023	«Bird of Paradise»
2025	«Breath»
2025	«Neither friend nor foe»
2025	«Me and You»
2025	«The moment»
2026	«Thunderstorm»
2026	«Night Bus»

Guest participation
Year	Song Title
2022	«You know» (with SakharSoSteklom)
2023	«At your door» (with Khizhina Musykanta)
2024	«The January blizzard is ringing» (with the Brotherhood of Atom, BassnPanda, Atomic Heart)
2025	«The Beautiful Afar» (with the Brotherhood of Atom)
