= Knyazevo, Yaroslavl Oblast =

Village in Yaroslavl Oblast, Russia

Knyazevo Князево
- Village
- Interactive map of Knyazevo
- Country: Russia
- Oblast: Yaroslavl Oblast
- District: Poshekhonsky District
- Municipality: Prigorodnoye Rural Settlement

Population (2010)
  - Total: 127
- Time zone: UTC+3
- Postal code: 152850

Knyazevo (Russian: Князево) is a village in the Poshekhonsky District of the Yaroslavl Oblast of Russia. The village is adjacent to Penkovo.

There is a monument in the village to the Great Patriotic War.

== Geography ==
The village is located in the Northern area of Yaroslavl Oblast, on the banks of the Pechevka River, and is located 2.5 kilometres northwest of Poshekhonye, 1 kilometre southwest of Bosharovo, and half a kilometre west of Panovo.

The village is in the Moscow Time (UTC+3).

== History ==
The village Church of the Exaltation of the Cross was built of stone in 1792 using funds from the parishioners. There were three altars. There was also a chapel dedicated to the Smolensk Mother of God. The church is now abandoned. A school was built in the village by 1908.

During the Late 19th and Early 20th Century, the village was part of the Poshekhonskaya Volost.

Since 1929, the village has been the centre of the Knyazevsky Selsoviet, and since January 2005 has been part of the Prigorodnoye Rural Settlement.

== Transport ==
The village is served by bus № 110 Poshekhonye-Zubarevo, № 119 Poshekhonye-Zinkino, № 5930 Cherepovets-Rybinsk, and № 6794 Cherepovets-Ivanovo.

== Population ==
The population of the village was 97 in 1859.

An 1861 document says there were 17 houses, with 14 males and 57 females.

According to the 2002 Russian census, there were 165 residents, with 96% being Russian.

The population of the village was 130 in 2007, and declined to 127 in 2010.
