= Nosa (Russia) =

- Native name: Носа (Russian)

Location
- Country: Russia

Physical characteristics
- Source
  - coordinates: 58°43′44″N 39°35′05″E
- Mouth
  - location: Teleshevo
  - coordinates: 58°46′44.04″N 39°19′26.76″E
- Length: 38 km (24 mi)
- Basin size: 153km2
- Discharge
  - location: Sogozha

The Nosa (Russian: Носа) is a river in the Yaroslavl Oblast of Russia.

The Nosa rises in woodland near the village of Vyazovka. The river flows past the villages of Onosovo, Baluiki, Zhelonka, Vladychnoe, Shiryayka, Anufrievo, Medvedka and Branikha. The length of the river is 38km, with a catchment area of 153km2. The river has two tributaries, Yastrebka and Chernaya Rechka.

The river belongs to the Upper Volga Basin District.
