= Medvedka (Moskva tributary) =

River in Moscow Oblast, Russia

Coordinates: 55°17′16″N 38°43′10″E

A bridge across Medvedka by Shilkovo

Medvedka is a river in Moscow Oblast, Russia, a left tributary of Moskva river. It length is 23 km, river basin is 121 sq.km. It joins Moskva 31km from its mouth.
