= Moskva (river) =

River in Russia

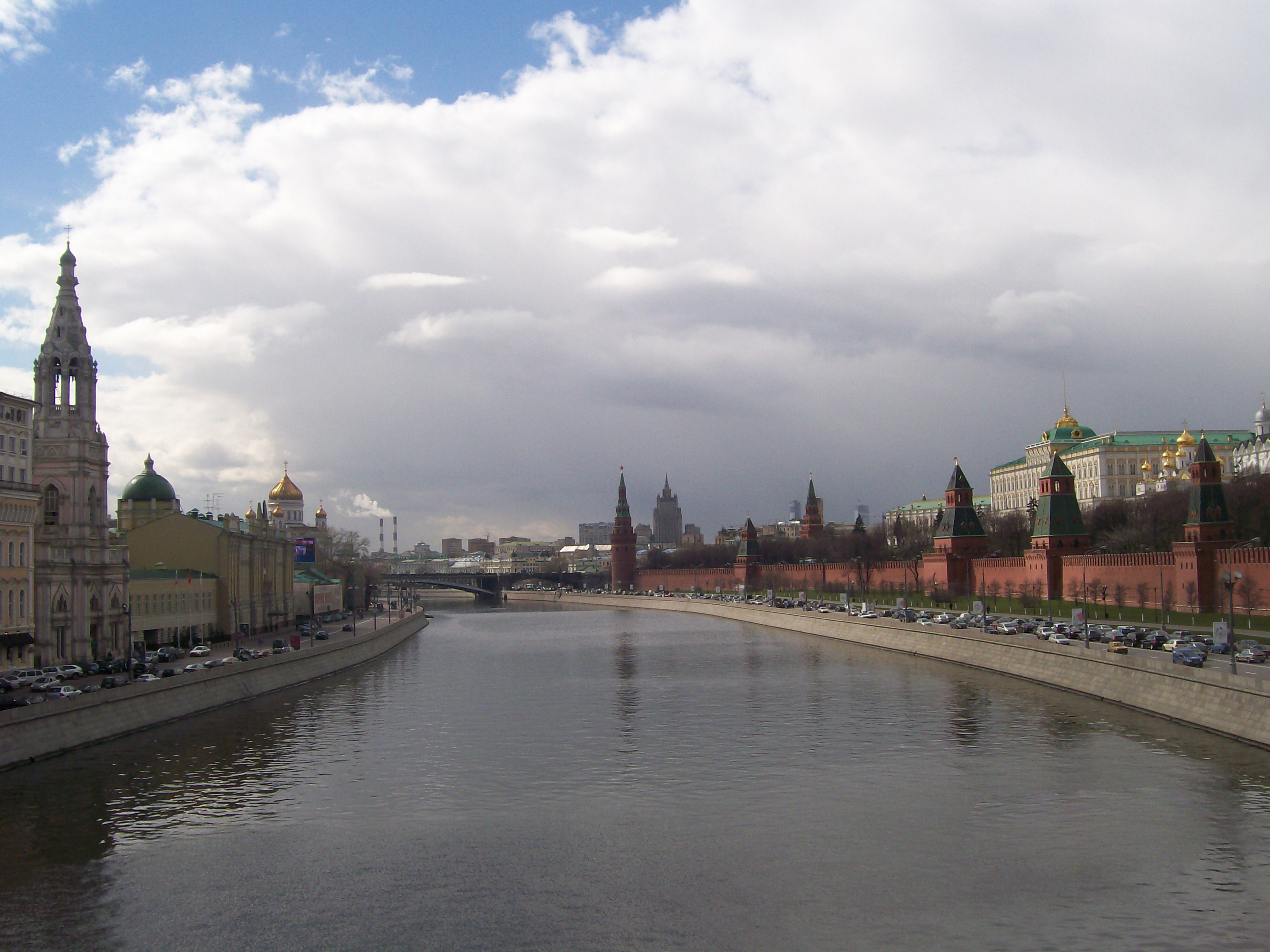
- The Moskva at the Kremlin in Moscow

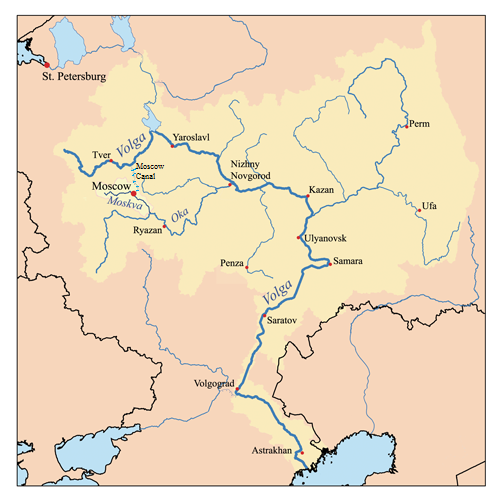
- Map of the Volga watershed with the Moskva highlighted; the two rivers are directly connected by the Moscow Canal
- Native name: Москва (Russian)

Location
- Country: Russia
- Federal subjects: Moscow Oblast, Smolensk Oblast, Moscow City
- Major cities: Mozhaysk, Zvenigorod, Moscow, Zhukovsky, Bronnitsy, Voskresensk, Kolomna

Physical characteristics
- Source: Moskva
  - location: Sychiki
  - coordinates: 55°30′50″N 35°21′50″E
  - elevation: 246 m (807 ft)
- Mouth: Oka
  - location: Kolomna
  - coordinates: 55°04′31″N 38°50′43″E
  - elevation: 98 m (322 ft)
- Length: 473 km (294 mi)
- Basin size: 17,600 km^{2} (6,800 sq mi)

Basin features
- Progression: Oka→ Volga→ Caspian Sea

The Moskva (/məsˈkvɑː/ məs-KVAH or /ˈmɒskvə/ MOS-kvə; Russian: Москва) (Note: It is often referred to as the River Moskva (Russian: река Москва, romanized: reka Moskva) or the Moskva River (Russian: Москва-река, romanized: Moskva-reka), in order to better distinguish it from the city of Moscow and its surrounding metropolitan area.) is a river that flows through Western Russia. It rises about 140 kilometers (87 mi) west of Moscow and flows roughly east through the Smolensk and Moscow Oblasts, passing through central Moscow. About 110 kilometers (68 mi) southeast of Moscow, at the city of Kolomna, it flows into the Oka, itself a tributary of the Volga, which ultimately flows into the Caspian Sea.

== History ==
According to recent studies, the current riverbed of the Moskva River was occupied about 12,000 years ago.

In addition to Finnic tribes, the Moskva River is also the origin of Slavic tribes such as the Vyatichi.

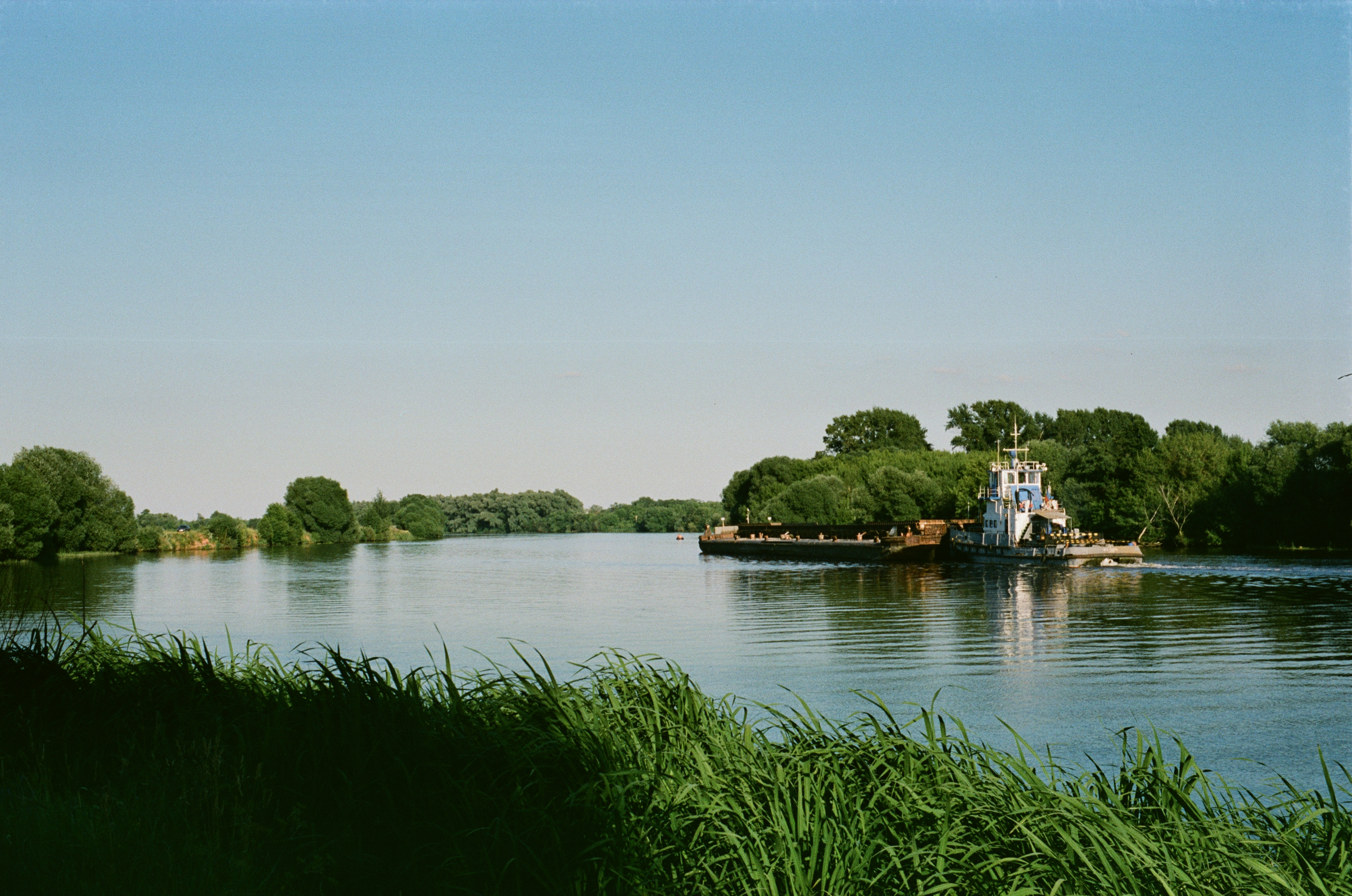
River pusher with barge on the Moskva River (2020)

== Etymology ==
The word "Moskva" is the Russian word for Moscow. The name of the city is thought to be derived from the name of the river. Several theories of the origin of the name have been proposed.

The most linguistically well-grounded and widely accepted is from the Proto-Balto-Slavic root *mŭzg-/muzg- from the Proto-Indo-European *meu- "wet", so the name Moskva might signify a river at a wetland or a marsh. Its cognates include Russian: музга, muzga "pool, puddle", Lithuanian: mazgoti and Latvian: mazgāt "to wash", Sanskrit: májjati "to drown", Latin: mergō "to dip, immerse". In many Slavic countries Moskov is a surname, most common in Russia, Bulgaria, Ukraine and North Macedonia. Additionally, there are similarly named places in Poland like Mozgawa.

According to one of the Finno-Ugric hypotheses, the Merya and Muroma people, who were among the several pre-Slavic tribes which originally inhabited the area, called the river Mustajoki "Black river", and the name of the river derives from this term. Various other theories (of Celtic, Iranian, Caucasic origins), having little or no scientific ground, are now largely rejected by contemporary linguists.

To distinguish the river and the city, Russians usually call the river Moskva-reka (Moskva river/Река Москва)) instead of just Moskva.

== Hydrology ==
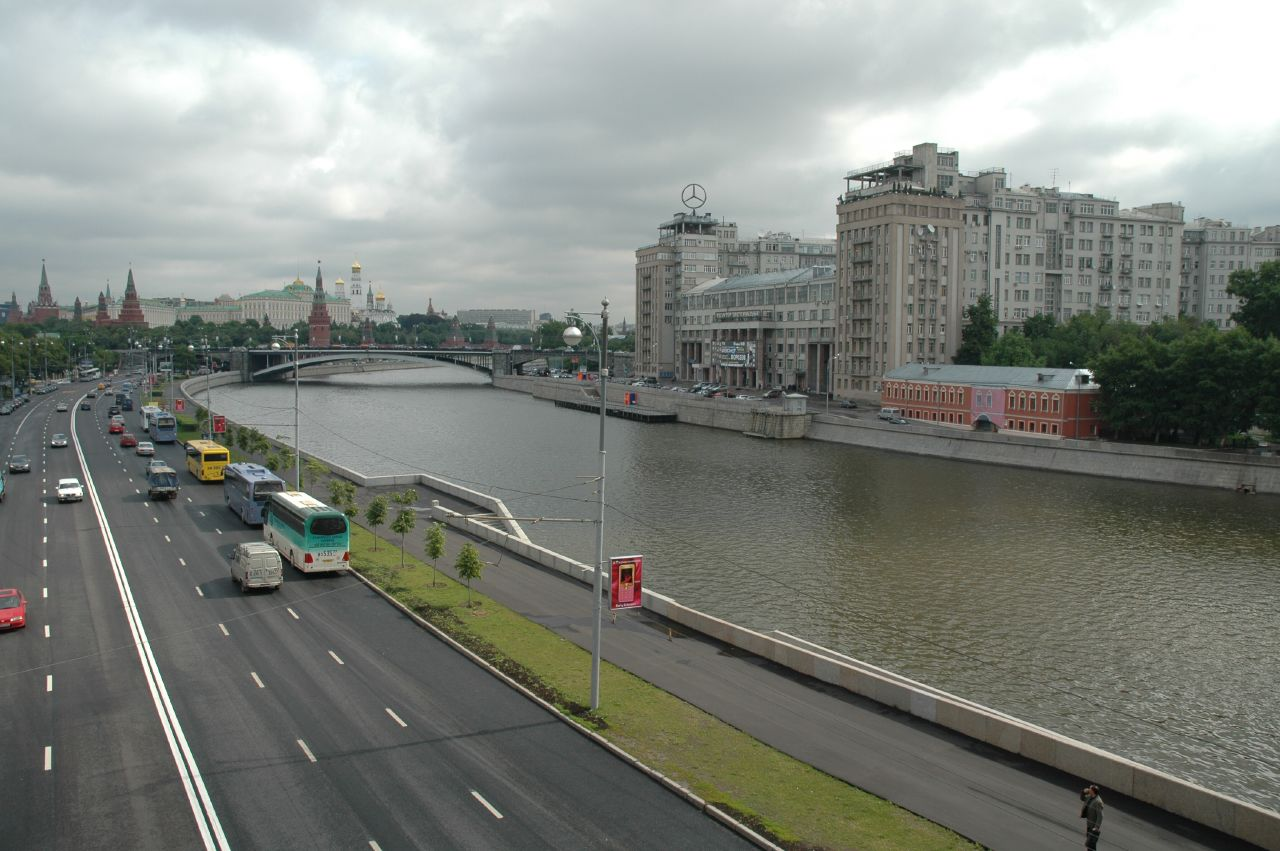
Moskva River in central Moscow, view towards the Kremlin

The river is 473 kilometers (294 mi) long (or 502 kilometers or 312 miles), and the area of its drainage basin is 17,600 square kilometers (6,800 sq mi). It has a vertical drop of 155 meters (509 ft) (long-term average). The maximum depth is 3 meters (9.8 ft) above Moscow city limits, and up to 6 meters (20 ft) below it. Normally, it freezes around November–December and begins to thaw around late March. During an unusually warm winter in 2006–2007, ice began to melt on January 25. The portion of the river running through Moscow only freezes occasionally on account of contamination.

The absolute water level in downtown Moscow is 120 meters (390 ft) above sea level (long-term average of summer lows after World War II); a historical maximum of 127.25 meters (417.5 ft) above sea level was set by the tragic 1908 flood.

== Sources of water ==
The main tributaries of the Moskva are, from source to mouth; distabnce from mouth:

- Ruza (left, 342km)
- Istra (left, 247km)
- Skhodnya (left, 218km)
- Setun (right, 184km)
- Yauza (left, 174km)
- Pakhra (right, 120km)
- Pekhorka (left, 110km)
- Nerskaya (left, 43km)
- Medvedka (left, 31km)
- Severka (right, 16km)

Sources of water are estimated as 61% thaw, 12% rain and 27% subterranean. Since completion of the Moscow Canal (1932–1937), the Moskva River has also collected a share of Upper Volga water. This has enabled reliable commercial shipping, which was previously interrupted by summer droughts (older dams built in 1785, 1836 and 1878 were not effective). The average discharge, including Volga waters, varies from 38 cubic meters per second (1,300 cu ft/s) near Zvenigorod to 250 cubic meters per second (8,800 cu ft/s) at the Oka inlet. The speed of the current, depending on the season, varies from 0.1 meters per second (0.33 ft/s) (winter, dams closed) to 1.5–2.0 meters per second (4.9–6.6 ft/s) (May, dams open).

== Cities and towns ==
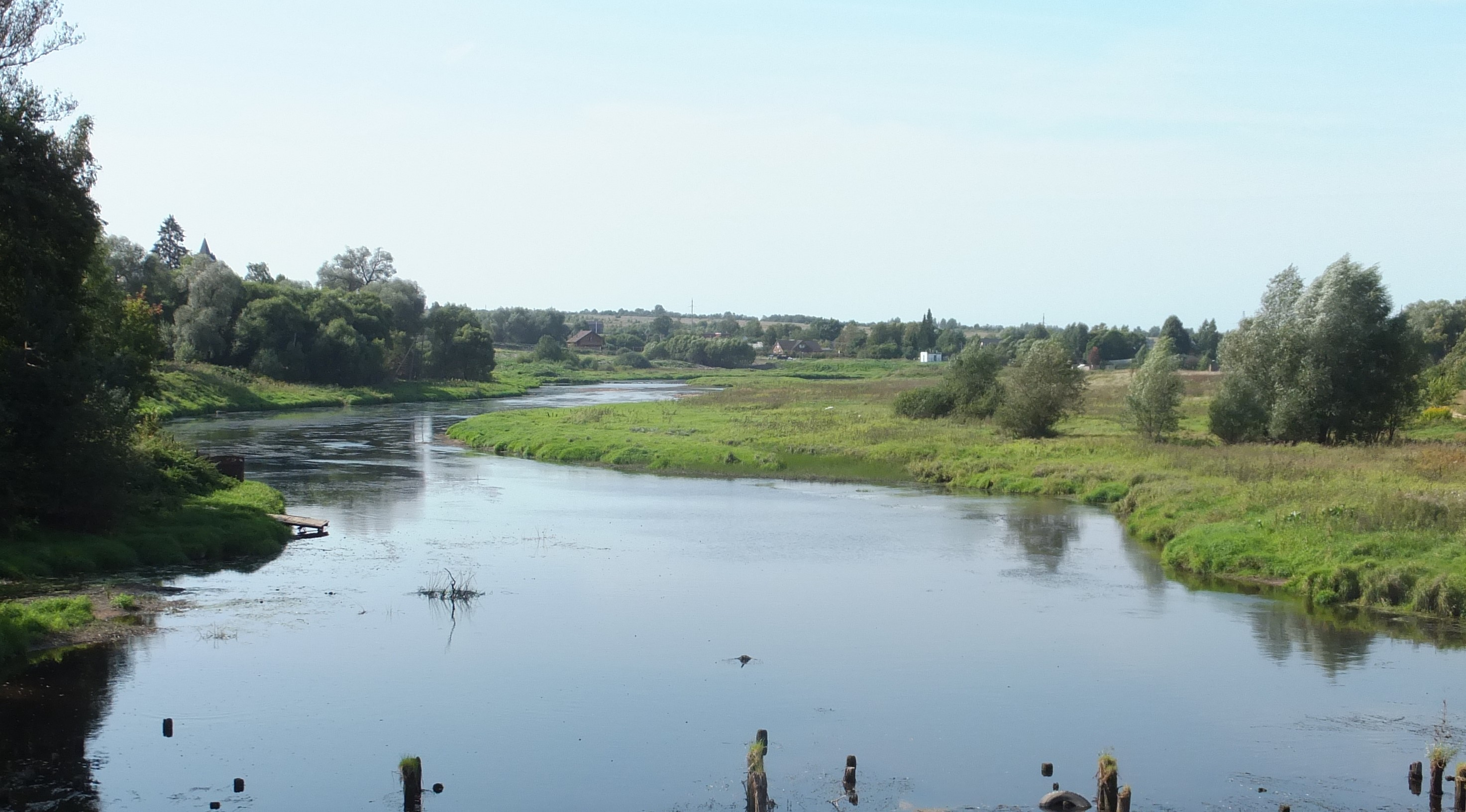
Moskva River in Mozhaisk

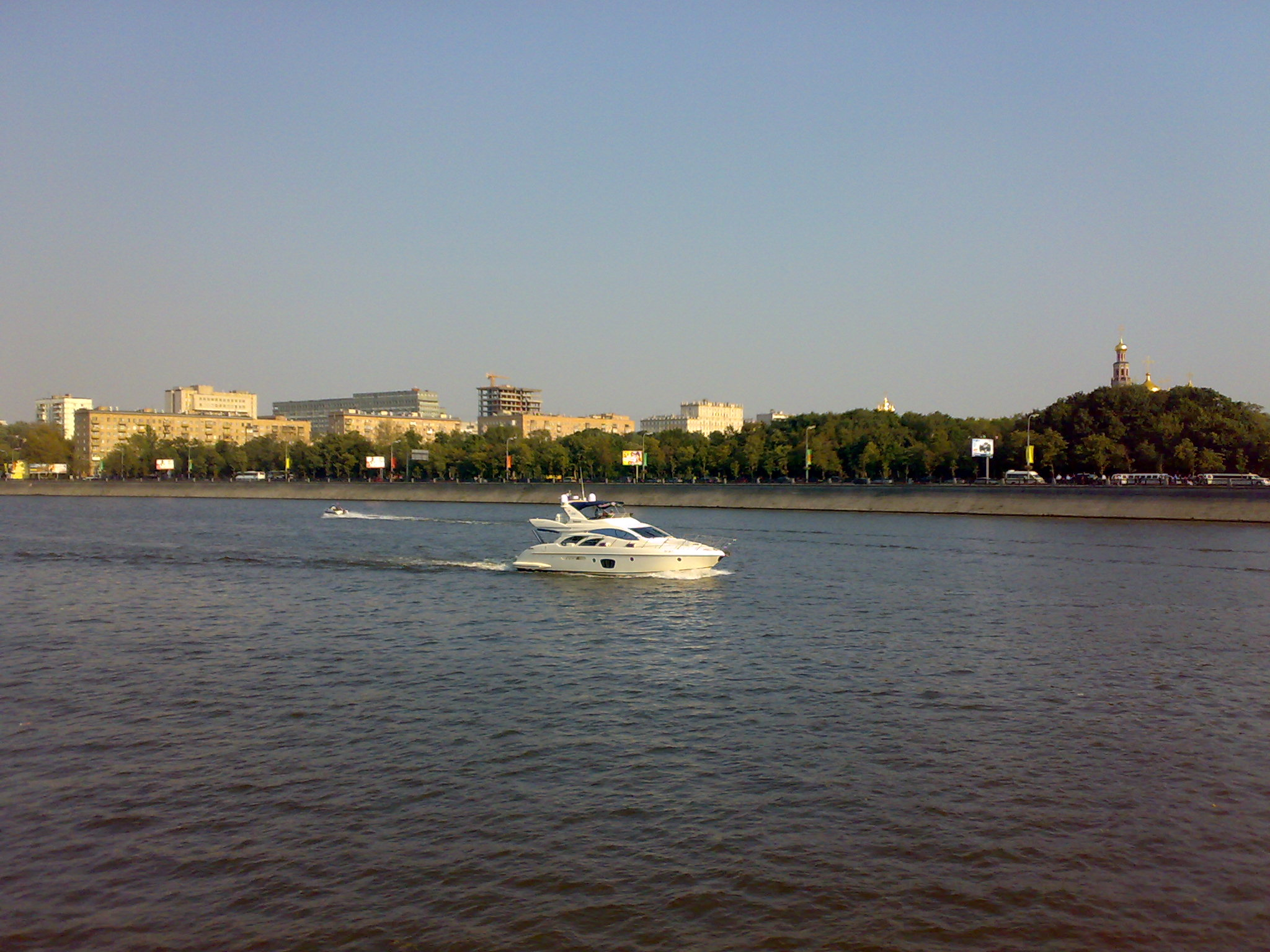
Boats on the Moskva River near the Luzhniki area of Moscow, with Novodevichy Convent at right

Moscow (Москва́), the capital and most populous city of Russia, is situated on its banks. The river also flows through the towns of Mozhaysk, Zvenigorod, Zhukovsky, Bronnitsy, Voskresensk, and — at the confluence of the Moskva and Oka — Kolomna. As of 2007, there are 49 bridges across the Moskva River and its canals within Moscow city limits; the first stone bridge, Bolshoy Kamenny Bridge, was erected in 1692. Within the city, the river is 120–200 meters (390–660 ft) wide, the narrowest point being under the Kremlin walls. Drinking water for the city of Moscow is collected from five stations on the Moskva River and from the Upper Volga reservoirs (north and north-west of the city).

== Islands ==
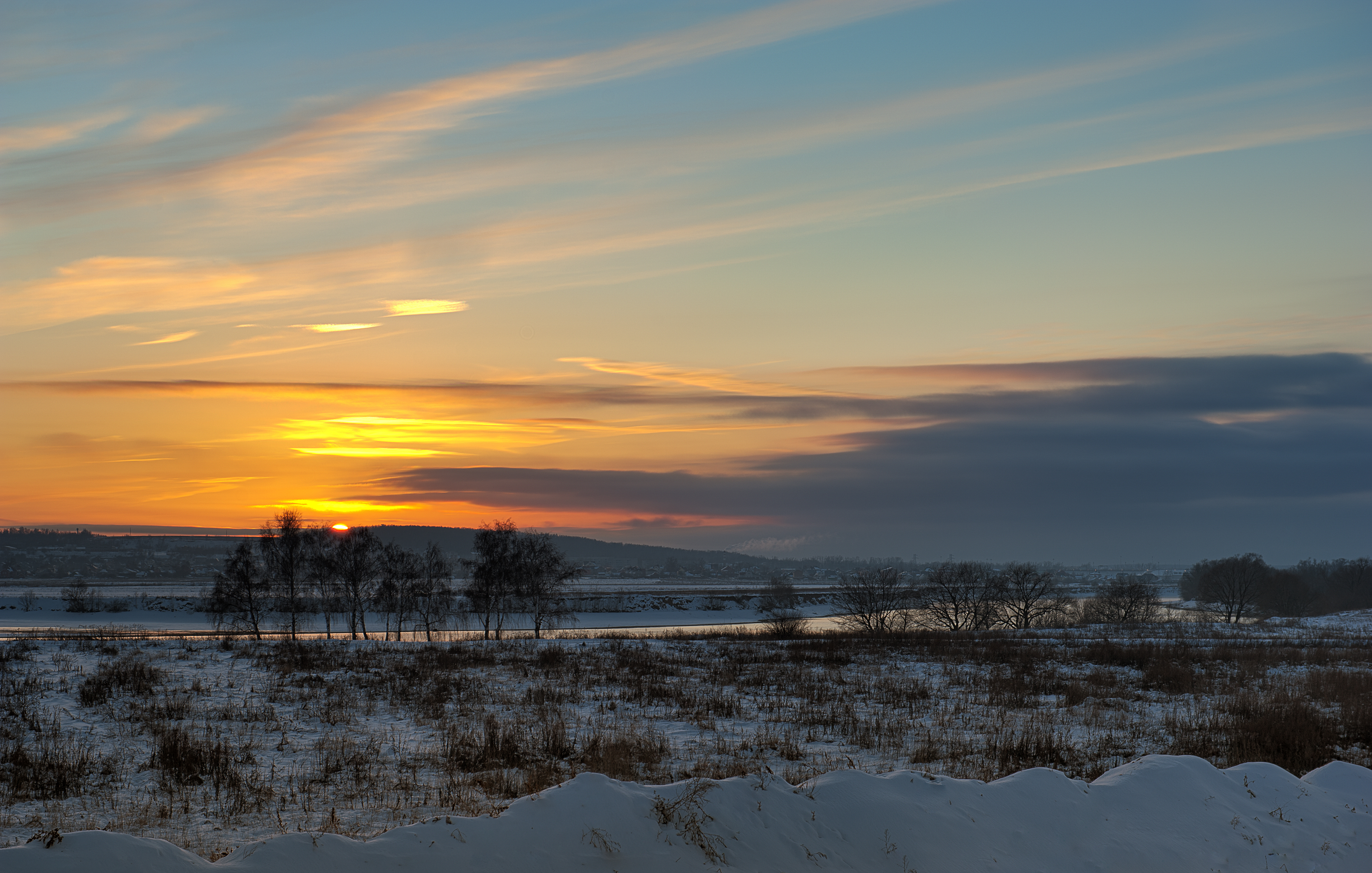
January 2012 Sunset near the Moskva River

Canals, built within Moscow city limits, have created a number of islands. Some of them have names in Russian, but some have none. One of the most famous is an unnamed artificial island in the center of the city between the river proper and the Bypass Canal. Major, permanent islands (west to east) are:

- Serebryany Bor (park). Separated from the mainland in the 1930s.
- Tatarskaya Poyma, commonly known as Mnyovniki. Separated from the mainland in the 1930s
- Balchug Island, also known as Bolotny Ostrov, lying just opposite the Kremlin. The island was formed by the construction of the Vodootvodny Canal in the 1780s, and has no official name in Russian. Moscow residents informally call it "Bolotny Ostrov" (Bog Island) while members of Moscow's English-speaking community refer to it as Balchug.
- One uninhabited island — Bobrovy (Бобровый) — north of Nagatino.
- Three uninhabited islands east of Nagatino, connected by the Pererva dam and lock system.

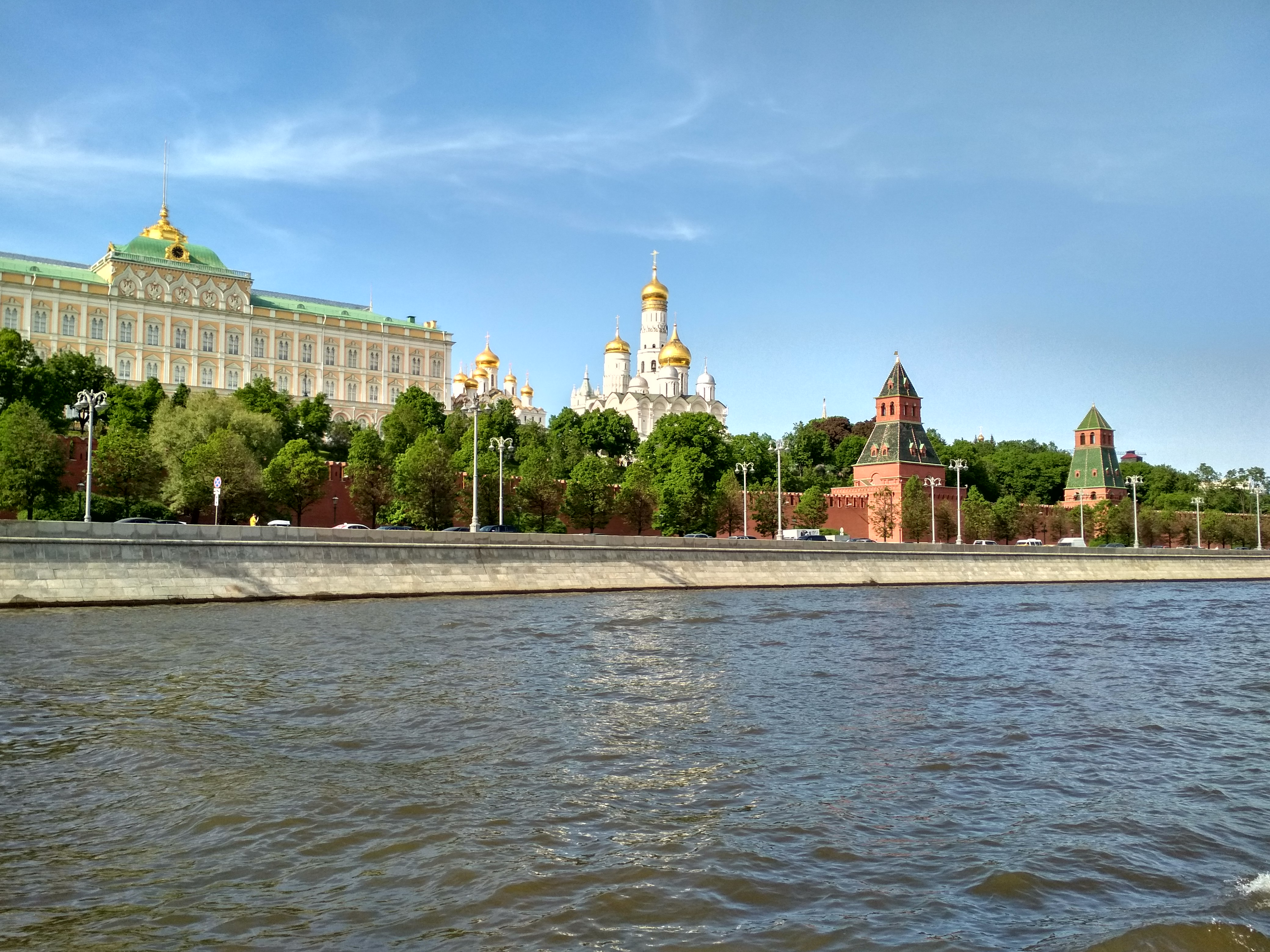
Moskva River near the Kremlin walls

== Recreation ==
There is a fleet of river ice-breaker cruisers which ply routes from moorings at the Hotel Ukraine and Gorky Park to the Novospassky Monastery and back. The duration of trips ranges from 1.5 to 3 hours.
