= Pechevka =

River in Yaroslavl Oblast, Russia

- Native name: Печевка (Russian)

Location
- Country: Russia

Physical characteristics
- Source
  - location: Svinarikha
  - coordinates: 58°37′52″N 39°04′42″E
- Mouth
  - location: Rybinsk Reservoir
  - coordinates: 58°30′45″N 39°05′05″E
- Length: 21 km (13 mi)
- Basin size: 67.1 km^{2} (25.9 mi^{2})
- Discharge
  - location: Sogozha

The Pechevka (Russian: Печевка) is a river in the Yaroslavl Oblast of Russia. It is 21 km (13 mi) long and has a drainage basin of 67.1 km^{2} (25.9 mi^{2}).

The river rises in woodland southwest of Svinarikha. The river flows South through the villages of Zayma-Novaya, Ivkino, Tsykunino, Artyukovo, Bosharovo, and Knyazevo to meet the Sogozha at the villages of Malye Yamy and Bolshie Yamy.
