= Sogozha =

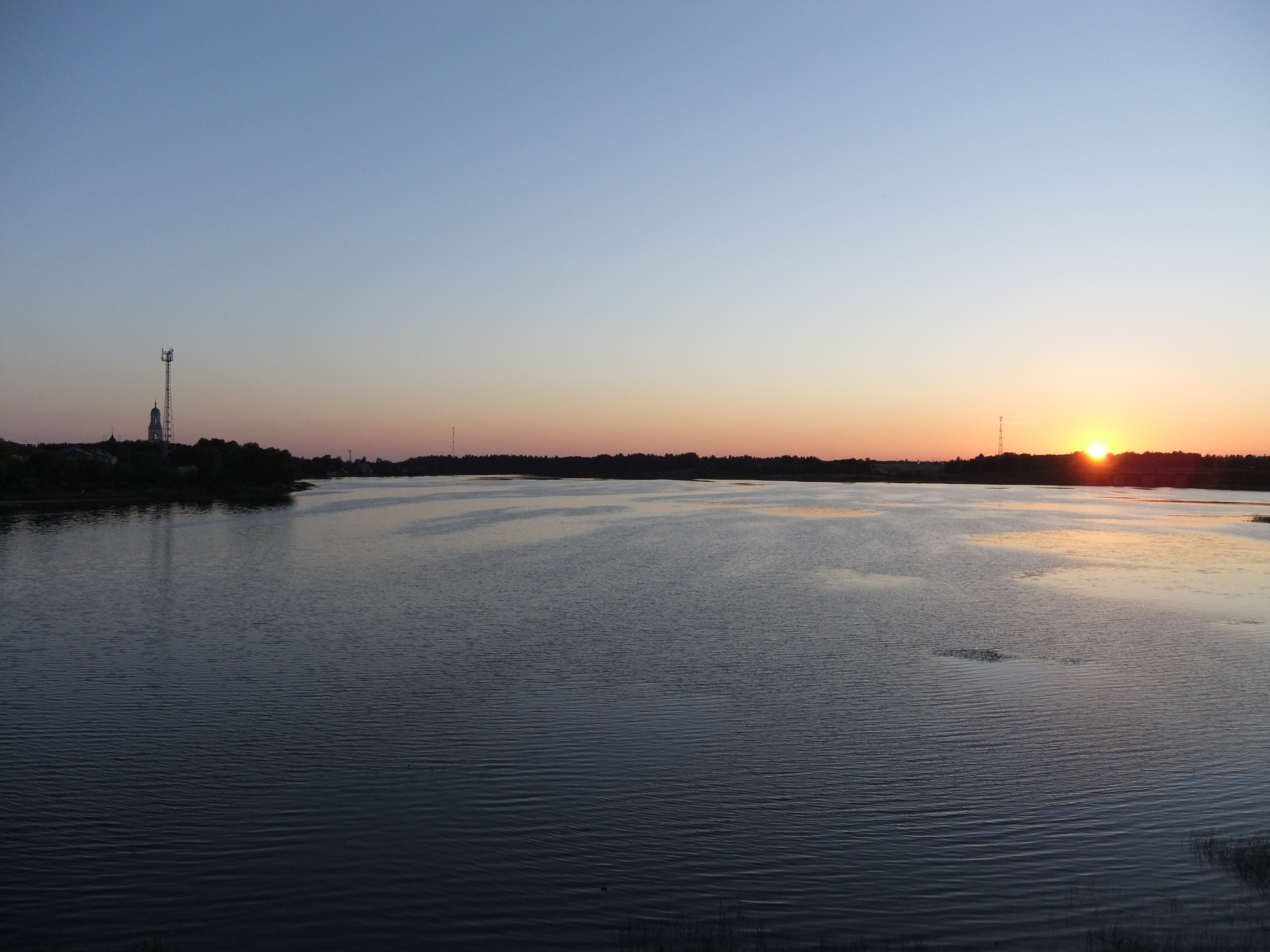
- The Sogozha and the Soga now jointly form a wide bay of the Rybinsk reservoir at Poshekhonye

- Map of the Rybinsk Reservoir basin. The Sogozha is shown on the map.
- Native name: Согожа (Russian)

Location
- Country: Russia

Physical characteristics
- Mouth: Rybinsk Reservoir
  - coordinates: 58.4902°N 39.0823°E
- Length: 129 km (80 mi)
- Basin size: 2,900 km^{2} (1,100 sq mi)

Basin features
- Progression: Rybinsk Reservoir→ Volga→ Caspian Sea

The Sogozha (Russian: Сого́жа) is a river in Vologda and Yaroslavl Oblasts in Russia. It is 129 kilometres (80 mi) long, with a drainage basin of 2,900 square kilometres (1,100 mi^{2}).

The river terminates in the Rybinsk Reservoir of the Volga. Before the construction of the Rybinsk Reservoir the Sogozha was a tributary of the Sheksna.

The town of Poshekhonye is situated on the left (southern) bank of the Sogozha. Historically, the river received two left tributaries, the Soga (from the east) and the Pertomka (from the south) within the city limits. Due to the water level rise caused by the Rybinsk Reservoir, the Sogozha and the Soga now form a wide bay at their joint entering of the reservoir.

Another tributary is the Nosa, Pechevka, and the Korsitsa.
