= Prechistoye, Pervomaysky District, Yaroslavl Oblast =

Prechistoye Пречистое
- "work settlement"
- Interactive map of Prechistoye
- Location of Prechistoye Prechistoye (Yaroslavl Oblast)
- Coordinates: 58°25′N 40°19′E
- Country: Russia
- Federal subject: Yaroslavl Oblast
- Administrative district: Pervomaysky District
- Founded: 1650

Population (2010 Census)
  - Total: 4,846
  - Estimate (1 January 2018): 4,672 (−3.6%)

Administrative status
  - Capital of: Pervomaysky District
- Time zone: UTC+3 (MSK)
- Postal code: 152430
- OKTMO ID: 78629151051

Prechistoye (Russian: Пречи́стое) is an urban locality (a work settlement) and the administrative center of Pervomaysky District of Yaroslavl Oblast, Russia. Population: 4,846 (2010 census); 5,092 (2002 census); 5,235 (1989 Soviet census).

== History ==
In the village there is the Uspensky Cathedral, built in 1798-1801 by the means of parishioners. There is a museum of local lore and woods, located in the former shop of merchant Sveshnikov. The People's Theater operates and was founded in 1918.

== Notable people ==
- Aleksandr Petrov (animator)
- Sasha Kvashenaya (singer)
