= Pervomaysky District, Yaroslavl Oblast =

Pervomaysky District Первомайский район (Russian)
- District
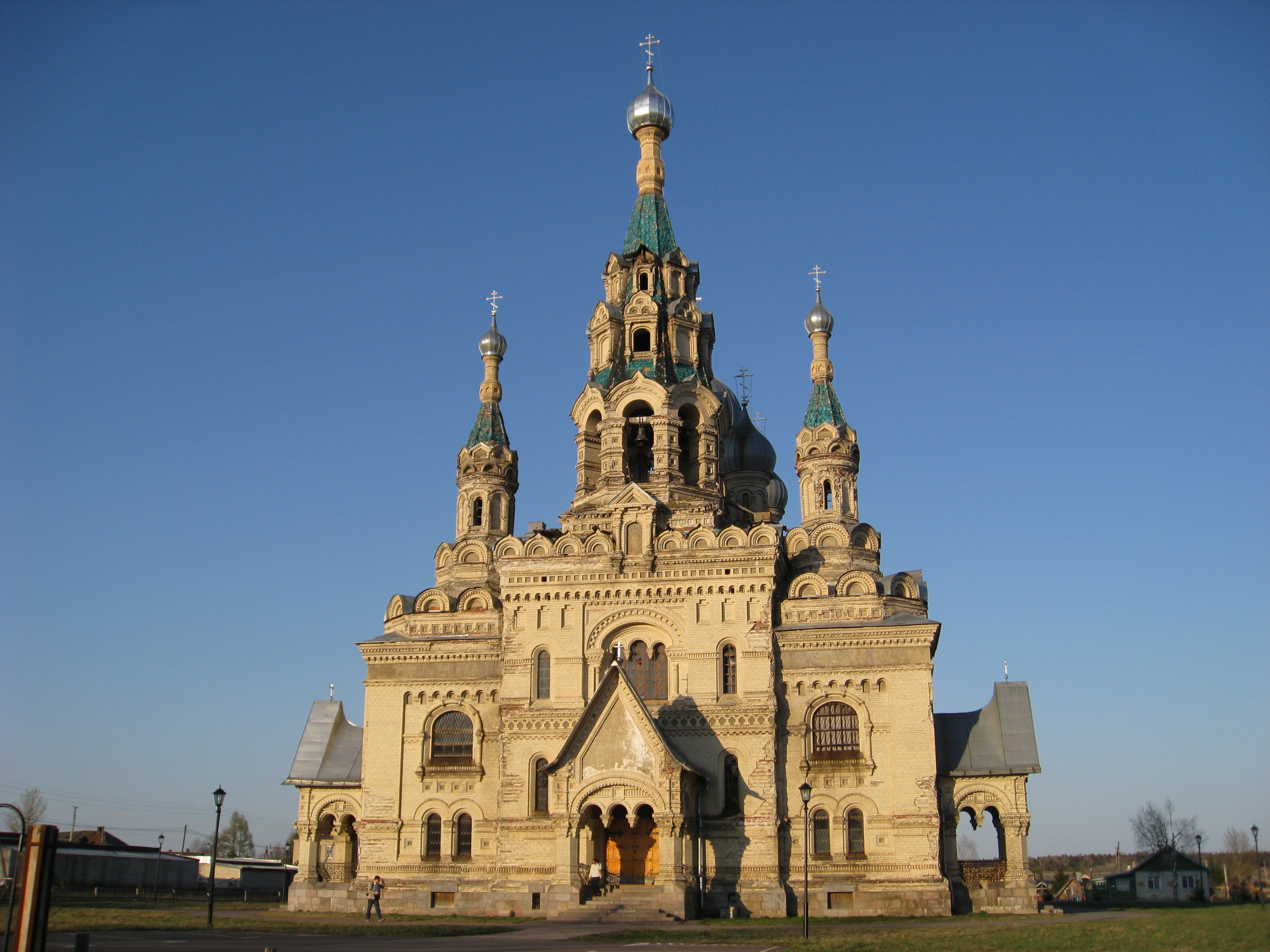
- Church of the Holy Mandylion, Pervomaysky District

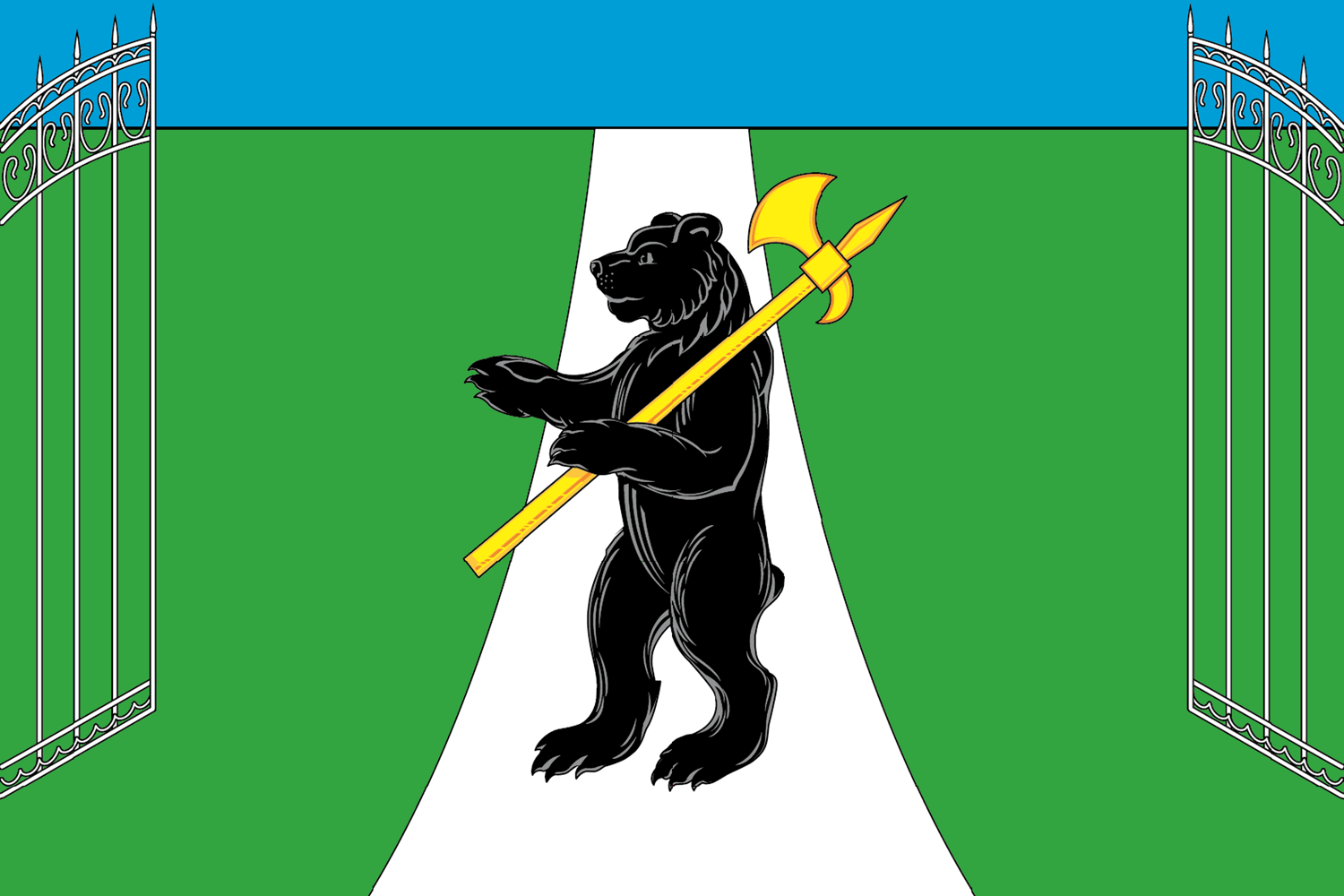
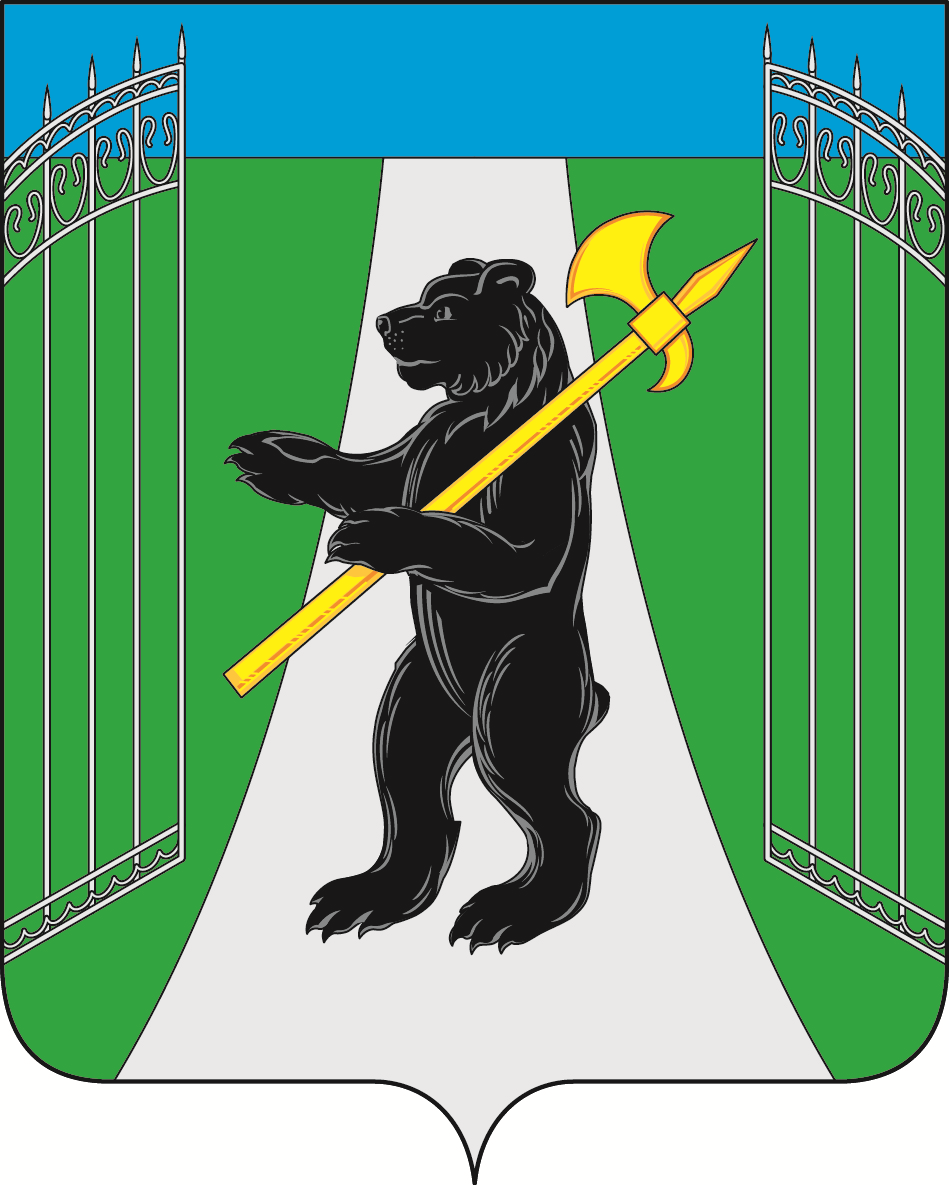
- Flag Coat of arms
- Location of Pervomaysky District in Yaroslavl Oblast
- Coordinates: 58°25′N 40°19′E
- Country: Russia
- Federal subject: Yaroslavl Oblast
- Established: 1929
- Administrative center: Prechistoye

Area
  - Total: 2,270 km^{2} (880 sq mi)

Population (2010 Census)
  - Total: 11,012
  - Estimate (2018): 10,074 (−8.5%)
  - Density: 4.85/km^{2} (12.6/sq mi)
  - Urban: 44.0%
  - Rural: 56.0%

Administrative structure
  - Administrative divisions: 1 Work settlements, 10 Rural okrugs
  - Inhabited localities: 1 urban-type settlements, 267 rural localities

Municipal structure
  - Municipally incorporated as: Pervomaysky Municipal District
  - Municipal divisions: 1 urban settlements, 2 rural settlements
- Time zone: UTC+3 (MSK)
- OKTMO ID: 78629000
- Website: http://prechistoe.adm.yar.ru/

Pervomaysky District (Russian: Первома́йский райо́н) is an administrative and municipal district (raion), one of the seventeen in Yaroslavl Oblast, Russia. It is located in the north of the oblast. The area of the district is 2,270 square kilometers (880 sq mi). Its administrative center is the urban locality (a work settlement) of Prechistoye. Population: 11,012 (2010 Census); 13,145 (2002 census); 15,070 (1989 Soviet census). The population of Prechistoye accounts for 44.0% of the district's total population.
