= Poshekhonye =

Town in Yaroslavl Oblast, Russia

Poshekhonye Пошехонье
- Town
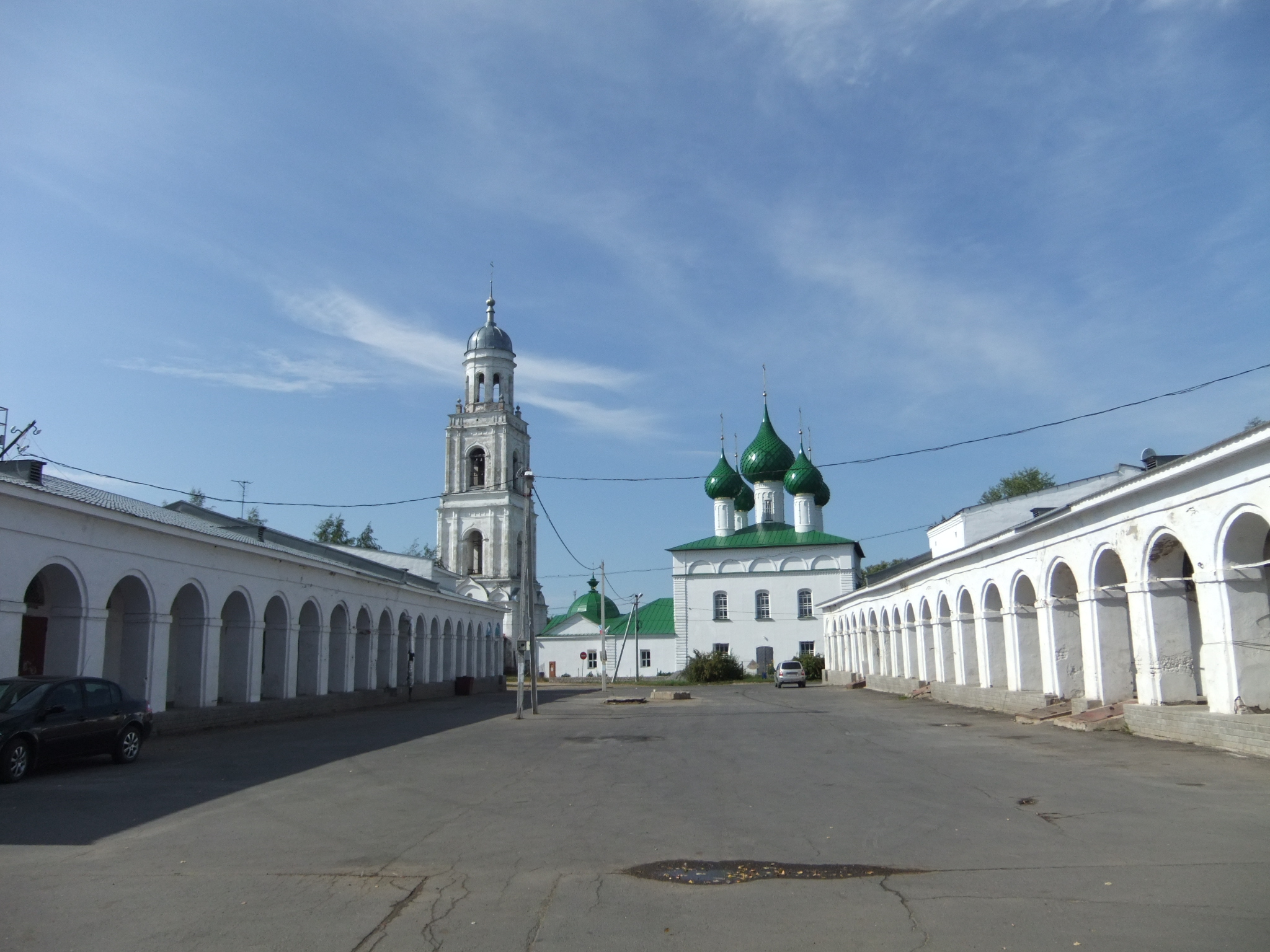
- The central square of Poshekhonye, with the shopping arcade and the Holy Trinity Cathedral

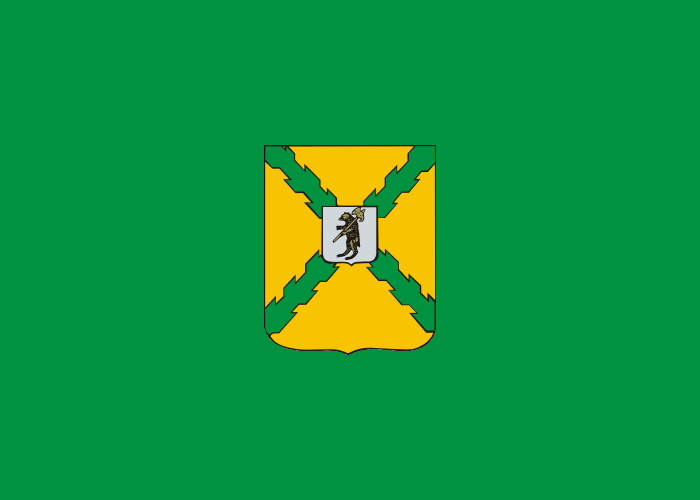
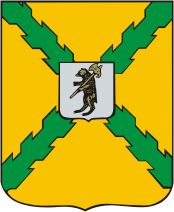
- Flag Coat of arms
- Interactive map of Poshekhonye
- Location of Poshekhonye Poshekhonye (Yaroslavl Oblast)
- Coordinates: 58°30′05″N 39°07′15″E
- Country: Russia
- Federal subject: Yaroslavl Oblast
- Administrative district: Poshekhonsky District
- Town of district significanceSelsoviet: Poshekhonye
- Founded: 17th century
- Town status since: 1777
- Elevation: 110 m (360 ft)

Population (2010 Census)
  - Total: 6,084

Administrative status
  - Capital of: town of district significance of Poshekhonye

Municipal status
  - Municipal district: Poshekhonsky Municipal District
  - Urban settlement: Poshekhonye Urban Settlement
  - Capital of: Poshekhonsky Municipal District, Poshekhonye Urban Settlement
- Time zone: UTC+3 (MSK)
- Postal code: 152850
- OKTMO ID: 78634101001
- Website: admgorposh.ru

Poshekhonye (Russian: Пошехо́нье) is a town and the administrative center of Poshekhonsky District in Yaroslavl Oblast, Russia, located on the Sogozha River, 151 kilometers (94 mi) northwest of Yaroslavl, the administrative center of the oblast. Population: 6,084 (2010 census); 6,973 (2002 census); 8,042 (1989 Soviet census).

It was previously known as Pertoma (until 1777), Poshekhonye (until 1918), Poshekhonye-Volodarsk (until 1992).

== History ==
It was founded as the village of Pertoma (Пертома) in the 17th century. In 1777, it was granted town status and renamed Poshekhonye. In 1918, the town was renamed Poshekhonye-Volodarsk (Пошехо́нье-Волода́рск), after V. Volodarsky. It bore that name until 1992, when it regained its old name of Poshekhonye.

== Administrative and municipal status ==
Within the framework of administrative divisions, Poshekhonye serves as the administrative center of Poshekhonsky District. As an administrative division, it is incorporated within Poshekhonsky District as the town of district significance of Poshekhonye. As a municipal division, the town of district significance of Poshekhonye is incorporated within Poshekhonsky Municipal District as Poshekhonye Urban Settlement.

== Economy ==
A popular variety of mass-produced cheese in Russia is called "Poshekhonsky". The original cheese factory in the city is currently no longer operating, although plans were made in 2007 to re-open it.

== Shishelovo ==
Shishelovo Шишелово
- Dacha settlement
- Interactive map of Shishelovo
- Coordinates: 58°30′45″N 39°07′08″E
- Country: Russia
- Oblast: Yaroslavl Oblast
- District: Poshekhonsky District
- Town of district significance: Poshekhonye
- Time zone: UTC+3
- Postal code: 152850

Shishelovo Russian: Шишелово is a dacha settlement in the town of Poshekhonye in the Poshekhonsky District of the Yaroslavl Oblast of Russia.

The settlement is located in the Northern area of Yaroslavl Oblast on the confluence of the Sogozha and the Shelsha. The settlement is adjacent to the village of Muzhikovo.

The settlement is in the Moscow Time (UTC+3).
