= Poshekhonsky District =

Poshekhonsky District Пошехонский район (Russian)
- District
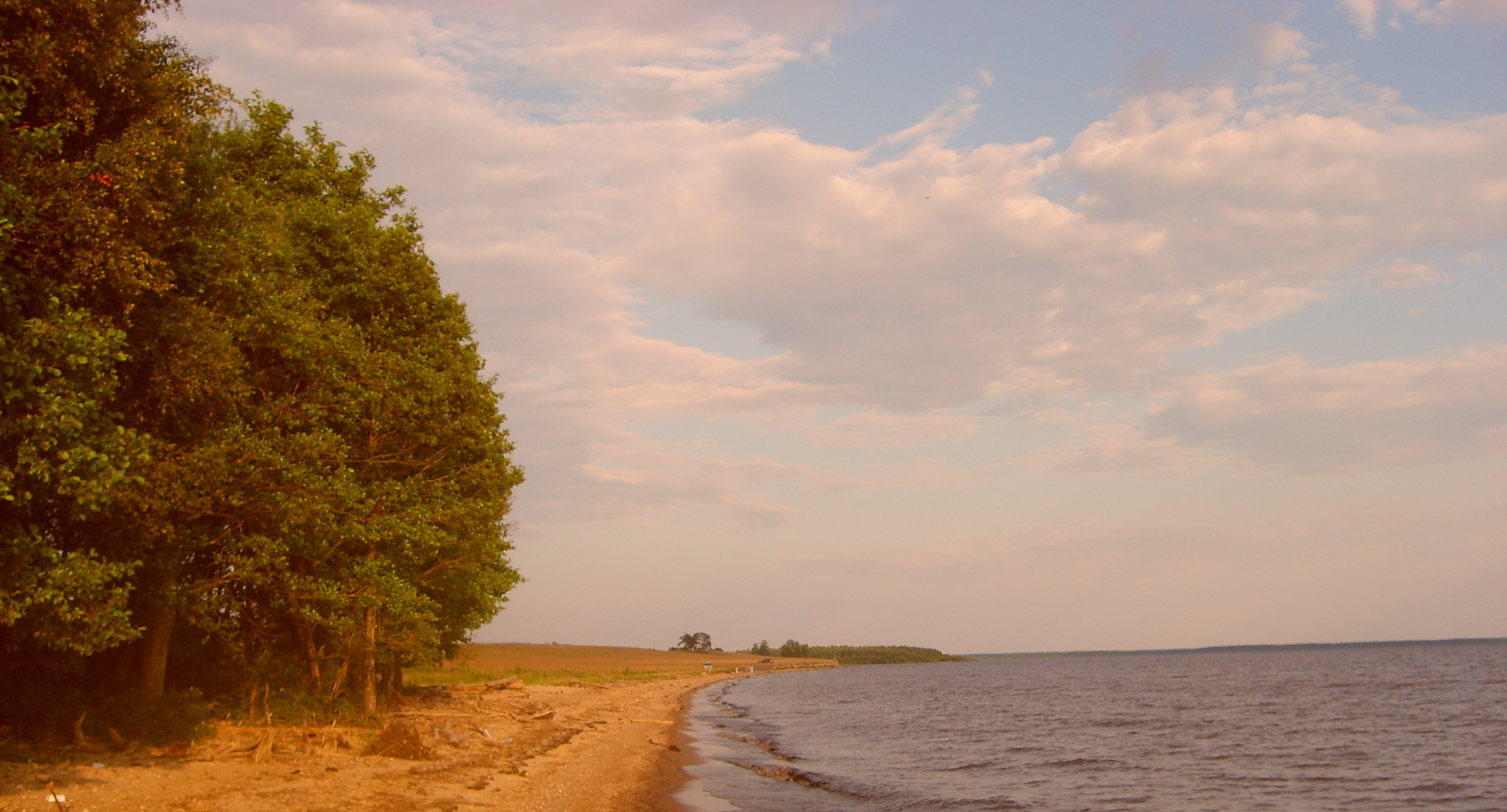
- Rybinsk Reservoir near the selo of Fedorkovo in Poshekhonsky District

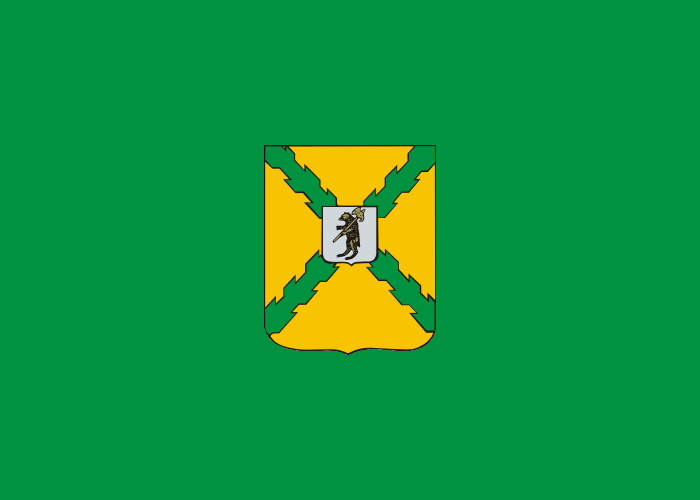
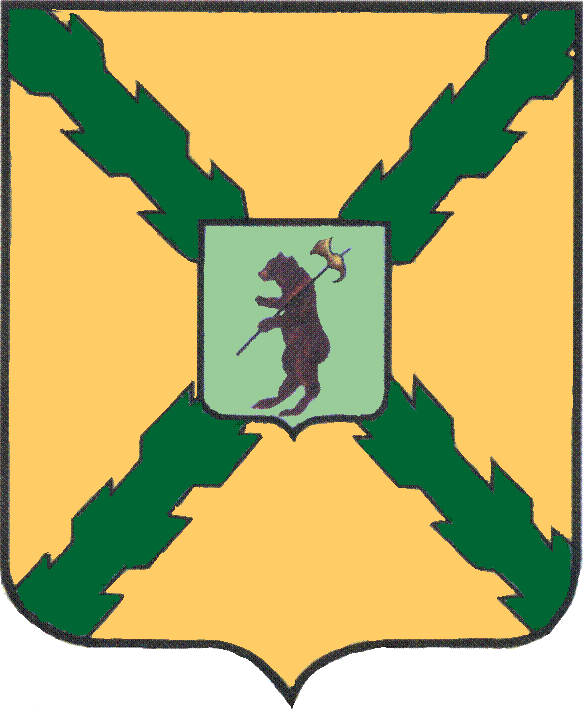
- Flag Coat of arms
- Location of Poshekhonsky District in Yaroslavl Oblast
- Coordinates: 58°30′N 39°07′E
- Country: Russia
- Federal subject: Yaroslavl Oblast
- Established: 10 June 1929
- Administrative center: Poshekhonye

Area
  - Total: 4,400 km^{2} (1,700 sq mi)

Population (2010 Census)
  - Total: 14,292
  - Estimate (2018): 13,227 (−7.5%)
  - Density: 3.2/km^{2} (8.4/sq mi)
  - Urban: 42.6%
  - Rural: 57.4%

Administrative structure
  - Administrative divisions: 1 Towns of district significance, 18 Rural okrugs
  - Inhabited localities: 1 cities/towns, 414 rural localities

Municipal structure
  - Municipally incorporated as: Poshekhonsky Municipal District
  - Municipal divisions: 1 urban settlements, 4 rural settlements
- Time zone: UTC+3 (MSK)
- OKTMO ID: 78634000
- Website: http://www.adm.yar.ru/power/mest/poshekh/

Poshekhonsky District (Russian: Пошехо́нский райо́н) is an administrative and municipal district (raion), one of the seventeen in Yaroslavl Oblast, Russia. It is located in the north of the oblast. The area of the district is 4,400 square kilometers (1,700 sq mi). Its administrative center is the town of Poshekhonye. Population: 14,292 (2010 Census); 18,209 (2002 census); 22,734 (1989 Soviet census). The population of Poshekhonye accounts for 42.6% of the district's total population.
