= Oblasts of Russia =

Administrative division of Russia

Oblasts
- Oblasts of Russia (yellow)
- Category: Federated state
- Location: Russian Federation
- Number: 46 (internationally recognised)
- Populations: 156,996 (Magadan Oblast) – 7,095,120 (Moscow Oblast)
- Areas: 15 100 km^{2} (Kaliningrad Oblast) - 767 900 km^{2} (Irkutsk Oblast)
- Government: Oblast Government, Oblast Duma
- Subdivisions: Raion, City of oblast significance, Selsoviet, Okrug, Urban-type settlement

In Russia, the oblasts are 46 administrative territories; they are one type of federal subject, the highest-level administrative division of Russian territory.

== Overview ==
Oblasts are constituent political entities in a federal union with representation in the Federation Council, and serve as a first-level administrative division. Each oblast features a state government holding authority over a defined geographic territory, with a state legislature, the Oblast Duma, that is democratically elected. The governor is the highest executive position of the state government in an oblast and is elected by the people. Oblasts are divided into raions (districts), cities of oblast significance (district-equivalent independent cities), and autonomous okrugs, which are legally federal subjects equal to an oblast but are administratively subservient to one. Two oblasts have autonomous okrugs: Arkhangelsk Oblast (Nenets Autonomous Okrug) and Tyumen Oblast (Khanty-Mansi Autonomous Okrug and Yamalo-Nenets Autonomous Okrug).

The term oblast can be translated into English as "province" or "region", and there are currently 46 oblasts, the most common type of the 85 federal subjects in Russia. The majority of oblasts are named after their administrative center, the official term for a capital city in an oblast, which is generally the largest city. Exceptions to this include Leningrad Oblast and Moscow Oblast, which have no official capital, and Sakhalin Oblast, which is named after a geographic location. Leningrad Oblast and Sverdlovsk Oblast retain the previous names of Saint Petersburg and Yekaterinburg, respectively. Oblasts are typically areas that are predominantly populated by ethnic Russians and native Russian language speakers, and are mostly located in European Russia. The largest oblast by geographic size is Tyumen Oblast at 1,435,200 km^{2} (excluding autonomous okrugs Irkutsk Oblast is the largest at 767,900 km^{2}) and the smallest is Kaliningrad Oblast at 15,100 km^{2}. The most populous oblast is Moscow Oblast at 7,095,120 and the least populous is Magadan Oblast at 156,996.

Krais, another type of federal subject, are legally identical to oblasts. The difference between a political entity with the name "oblast" and one named "krai" is purely traditional.

== History ==
In the Russian Empire, oblasts were a third-level administrative division, organized in 1849 and few in number, dividing the larger guberniyas (governorates) within the first-level krais. Following the numerous administration reforms during the Soviet era, the number of oblasts gradually increased as they became the primary top-level administrative division of the Soviet Socialist Republics (SSRs), the constituent political entities of the Soviet Union. These oblasts held very little autonomy or power, but when the Soviet Union dissolved into sovereign states along the lines of the SSRs, they became the first-level administrative divisions. The oblasts of the Russian SFSR, which transitioned into the Russian Federation, became the first-level administrative divisions of the new country and received greater devolved power.

=== Russo-Ukrainian War ===
During the Russian invasion of Ukraine, Russia annexed the Donetsk, Kherson, Luhansk and Zaporizhzhia regions of Ukraine. While Donetsk and Luhansk were incorporated as republics, having their respective separate constitutions adopted since 2014 back when they were two breakaway states of Ukraine, Kherson and Zaporizhzhia were annexed de jure, but not de facto, as regular oblasts. Including these, the Kremlin claims a total of 48 oblasts. The four regions remain internationally recognized as part of Ukraine and are only partially occupied by Russia and its control of the territory is not totally assured.

== List ==
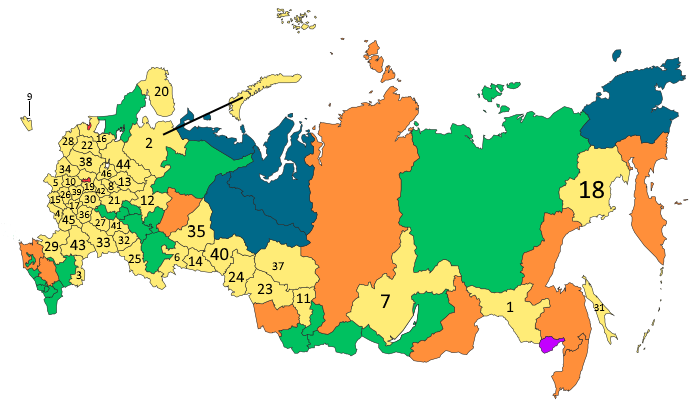

1. (Amur Oblast) Amur
2. (Arkhangelsk Oblast) Arkhangelsk
3. (Astrakhan Oblast) Astrakhan
4. (Belgorod Oblast) Belgorod
5. (Bryansk Oblast) Bryansk
6. (Chelyabinsk Oblast) Chelyabinsk
7. (Irkutsk Oblast) Irkutsk
8. (Ivanovo Oblast) Ivanovo
9. (Kaliningrad Oblast) Kaliningrad
10. (Kaluga Oblast) Kaluga
11. (Kemerovo Oblast) Kemerovo
12. (Kirov Oblast) Kirov
13. (Kostroma Oblast) Kostroma
14. (Kurgan Oblast) Kurgan
15. (Kursk Oblast) Kursk
16. (Leningrad Oblast) Leningrad
17. (Lipetsk Oblast) Lipetsk
18. (Magadan Oblast) Magadan
19. (Moscow Oblast) Moscow
20. (Murmansk Oblast) Murmansk
21. (Nizhny Novgorod Oblast) Nizhny Novgorod
22. (Novgorod Oblast) Novgorod
23. (Novosibirsk Oblast) Novosibirsk
24. (Omsk Oblast) Omsk
25. (Orenburg Oblast) Orenburg
26. (Oryol Oblast) Oryol
27. (Penza Oblast) Penza
28. (Pskov Oblast) Pskov
29. (Rostov Oblast) Rostov
30. (Ryazan Oblast) Ryazan
31. (Sakhalin Oblast) Sakhalin
32. (Samara Oblast) Samara
33. (Saratov Oblast) Saratov
34. (Smolensk Oblast) Smolensk
35. (Sverdlovsk Oblast) Sverdlovsk
36. (Tambov Oblast) Tambov
37. (Tomsk Oblast) Tomsk
38. (Tver Oblast) Tver
39. (Tula Oblast) Tula
40. (Tyumen Oblast) Tyumen
41. (Ulyanovsk Oblast) Ulyanovsk
42. (Vladimir Oblast) Vladimir
43. (Volgograd Oblast) Volgograd
44. (Vologda Oblast) Vologda
45. (Voronezh Oblast) Voronezh
46. (Yaroslavl Oblast) Yaroslavl

== See also ==
- Republics of Russia
- Krais of Russia
- Autonomous okrugs of Russia
- Federal cities of Russia
- Jewish Autonomous Oblast
