= Jedlicze =

Town in Subcarpathian Voivodeship, Poland

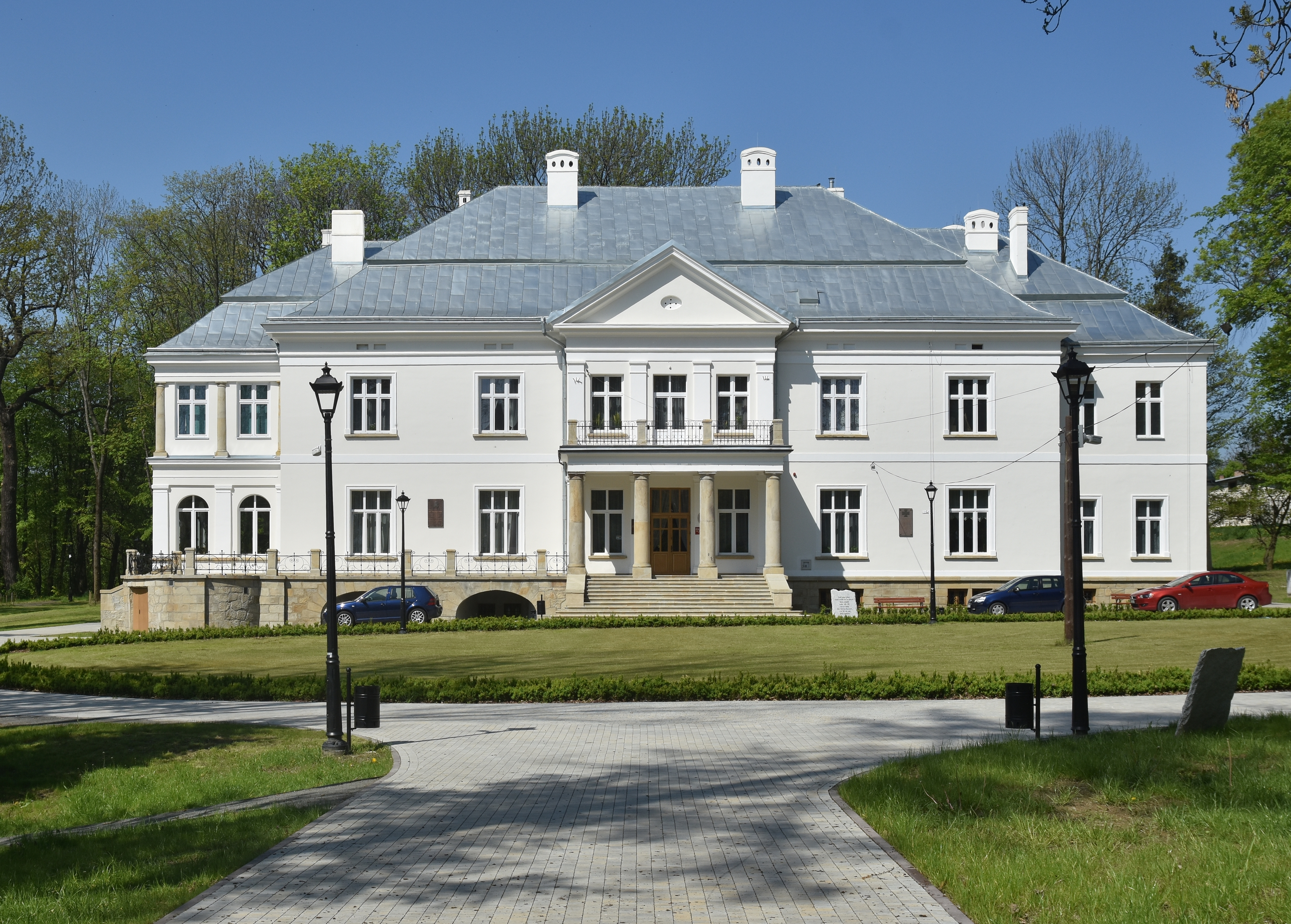
- Stawiarski Palace

- Flag Coat of arms

- Location within Poland
- Coordinates: 49°42′59″N 21°38′44″E
- Country: Poland
- Voivodeship: Subcarpathian
- County: Krosno
- Gmina: Jedlicze
- First mentioned: 1409
- Town rights: 1768

Government
  - Mayor: Wojciech Tomkiewicz

Area
  - Total: 10.6 km^{2} (4.1 sq mi)

Population (2006)
  - Total: 5,593
  - Density: 528/km^{2} (1,370/sq mi)
- Time zone: UTC+1 (CET)
  - Summer (DST): UTC+2 (CEST)
- Postal code: 38–460
- Car plates: RKR
- Website: http://www.jedlicze.pl/

Jedlicze (Polish pronunciation: [jɛdˈlʲit͡ʂɛ]) is a town in Krosno County, Subcarpathian Voivodeship, in south-eastern Poland, with a population of 5,645 (02.06.2009). It is home to a petroleum refinery.

Jedlicze lies on the Jasiołka river, in the western part of the Jasło–Krosno Basin, which forms the central part of the Jasło–Sanok Depression. It is the seat of the urban-rural Gmina Jedlicze. The town lies in the historic Sandomierz Land of Lesser Poland and, before the partitions, belonged to Pilzno County in the Sandomierz Voivodeship. Jedlicze belongs to the functional urban area of Krosno, which has 115,000 inhabitants. According to Statistics Poland, the town had 5,530 inhabitants on 1 January 2024, making it the 27th most populous town in the voivodeship.

== History ==
The name of the town is thought to derive from the Proto-Slavic word jedla, meaning "fir". During the Austrian Partition, the name was altered into the form Jedlicze, closer to the local speech.

The settlement was founded in the late 14th century and was first recorded in 1409. Among the first records attesting to the existence of the village is the mention, in 1410, of the sołtys Piotr of Jedlicze, who fought in the Battle of Grunwald. At that time Jedlicze belonged to the noble families of Mleczko and Bączalski. In 1427 local documents mention Piotr Mleczko of Jedlicze (owner of Polanka in 1429–1435), who lent 100 marks to the nobleman Fryderyk of Jaćmierz. In 1464 Mikołaj Mleczko of Jedlicze sold the right to use the forest in Polanka to Klemens Zebrzydowski. In 1530 Jedlicze still belonged to Mikołaj Mleczko and Stanisław Bączalski. In 1536 the noble villages of Polanka and Żarnowiec belonged to the Jedlicze parish, as the property of Mikołaj Żarnowiecki, to whom Bishop Piotr of Chrząstów granted, for his lifetime, the Bishop's Palace in Krosno. The bishop obliged the heir's relatives to hand the building over to the Bishop of Przemyśl after Żarnowiecki's death.

At the end of the 16th century the owner of Jedlicze was Justus Romer of Chyżów, who founded a prebend in 1598; in 1630 the owner was Jan Bączalski. In 1655 and 1657 the village was plundered by Swedish and Transylvanian troops (see Swedish invasion of Poland). In 1680 the heir of Jedlicze was Piotr Wielowiejski, and the estate then remained with the Wielowiejski family, who, following the general trend of founding towns, sought town rights for the settlement. In 1740 Remigiusz Wielowiejski built a church in Jedlicze. In the second half of the 18th century the village belonged to the Karnicki family, at whose initiative Jedlicze received its town charter in 1768. King Stanisław August Poniatowski confirmed the grant, which included the right to hold five fairs a year. In April 1769, near Jedlicze in the Krosno Land, a gathering of nobles took place at which a confederation was formed; they elected Adam Parys (c. 1740–1817) as its marshal. The official election of the marshal of the Sandomierz confederation took place in Pilzno. On 5 April 1770 the Battle of Jedlicze was fought between the confederate unit of Mączyński and the Russian troops of Yeltsaninov.

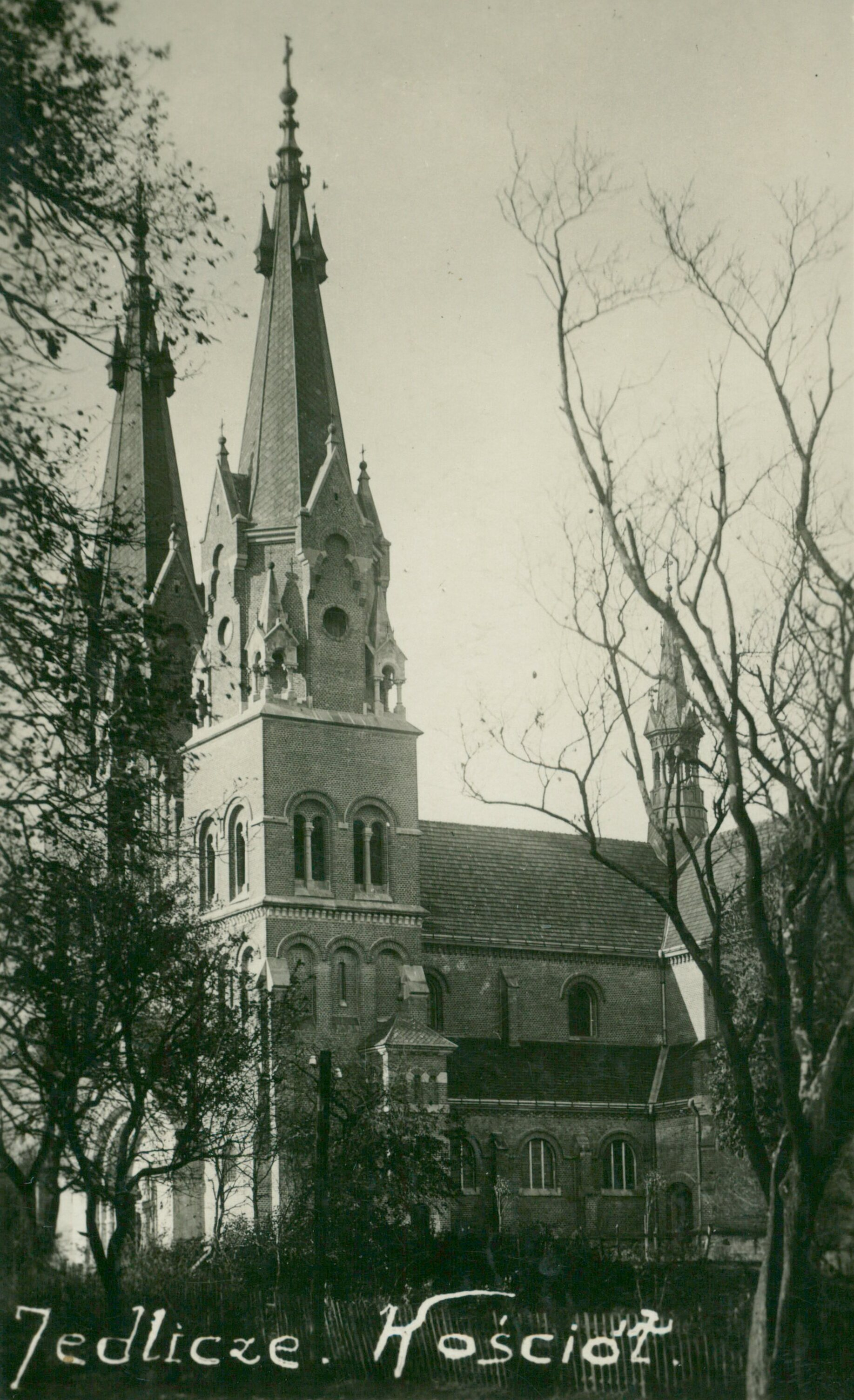
Early-20th-century view of the Saint Anthony church

Following the First Partition of Poland (1772), Jedlicze was annexed by the Habsburg Empire and remained in Austrian Galicia until 1918. During the partitions it lost its town rights; in 1884 the Austrian authorities stripped it of its town charter. In the first half of the 19th century Jedlicze became the property of the Stojowski family. Adam Stojowski, lord of Jedlicze, supported the activity of the emissaries of Edward Dembowski and was one of the organisers of the National Guard. From Ewa Stojowska, Jedlicze was bought by the oil industrialist Seweryn Stawiarski, who also acquired Wola Dębowiecka (later inherited by Walerian Stawiarski), Załęże near Osiek (in 1871) and the estate of Ignacy Łukasiewicz, Chorkówka (in 1882). In 1872–1884 railway lines were built through Jedlicze, from Stróże to Zagórz, and in 1890 a line linking Rzeszów with Krosno, with a railway station in Jedlicze. With the construction of a large oil refinery in 1899–1902, Jedlicze began to gain greater economic importance. Walerian Stawiarski owned the company "Fabryka Nafty w Krośnie" in 1922–1925; his family were the last private owners of Jedlicze.

In the interwar period, it was administratively located in the Krosno County in the Lwów Voivodeship of Poland. According to the 1921 census, the population was 82.0% Polish and 17.3% Jewish.

On 8 September 1939, during the invasion of Poland, battalions of the 1st Podhale Rifles Regiment concentrated in the Jedlicze area and from there began their retreat east towards Lwów. Several Poles, who were either born or lived and worked in Jedlicze, were murdered by the Russians in the Katyn massacre in 1940. During the German occupation, on 25 February 1942, the Gestapo from Kraków arrested at the Stawiarski Palace the writer Kazimierz Zdziechowski, Count Władysław Krasicki, Dr Stanisław Żejmo-Żejmis, a ZWZ officer known as "Rudek of Kraków", and Adam Stanisław Mickiewicz, husband of Zofia Konopnicka-Mickiewiczowa, daughter of Maria Konopnicka. In the following days, at the rectory, they arrested Fr Józef Przybylski, Prof. Stefan Firlej and Count Tadeusz Dzieduszycki. A plaque commemorating those arrested and later murdered in Auschwitz-Birkenau was unveiled on 6 February 1995.

In 1942 the Germans liquidated the ghetto; the local Jewish population was decimated in the Holocaust (see Jewish community). In 1944 the Gestapo from Jasło shot 22 men in Jedlicze, most likely prisoners from Jasło, as a reprisal for the shooting of a policeman. The bodies lay on the road for two days as a warning to the population and were then buried in a mass grave by the road to Długie.

Jedlicze had a Home Army outpost (codenamed "Jaśmin" and "Jaga", unit OP-15), which took part in many actions. It was commanded by Lt. Józef Domaniecki ("Szczerba") until January 1942, and then by Ens. Franciszek Kaczkowski ("Dragat") from February 1942 to September 1944. The largest action in the gmina was the attack in April 1943 on a school of Ukrainian Werkschutz auxiliaries, later incorporated into the SS "Galizien", and the blowing up of railway tracks in the summer of 1944, which derailed 13 wagons carrying weapons and ammunition intended for the eastern front. After Lt. Domaniecki, command of the outpost passed to 2nd Lt. Stanisław Betlej (1910 – 22 April 1945), codenamed "Lampart" and "Sierp", who led it during Operation Tempest and, together with the outposts in Krosno ("Korzeń") and Korczyna ("Konwalia"), raised the 2nd Battalion of the 6th Podhale Rifles Regiment, which took part in the concentration at Odrzykoń and in fighting near Iwonicz.

Jedlicze regained its town charter in 1967. In 1968 a commemorative plaque to the People's Army was unveiled on the primary school building. From 1975 to 1998 the town was administratively part of the Krosno Voivodeship.

=== Jewish community ===
Until the 19th century the Jewish community in Jedlicze was very small and was attached to the communities of Krosno or Jasło; it was reorganised at the beginning of the 20th century. According to the encyclopedia, 64 of the village's 389 inhabitants were Jews in 1880 (16.5%), 125 of 565 in 1900 (22.1%) and 148 of 782 in 1921 (18.9%). Most of the non-Jewish residents worked on the railway or on the estate.

In November 1918, army deserters and local peasants attacked Jewish homes and shops in a pogrom, and fourteen Jewish homes were set on fire. Between the wars the community employed a shochet and had a rabbi: Menachem Nahum Waksberg headed the rabbinical court before moving to Kraków to lead its religious court, and Itzhak Weissbrot was the last rabbi of Jedlicze; both were murdered in the Holocaust. A branch of the General Zionists was active in the village, a branch of the "Ezra" society for halutzim (pioneers) was reported in 1927, and the brotherhood "Agudat Achim", founded in 1927, attracted most of the Jewish youth and ran Hebrew courses.

In mid-September 1939 SS men searched Jewish homes for supposed weapons and looted money and valuables; they also gathered books and Torah scrolls and burned them on the main street. From January 1940 Jews over the age of twelve had to wear a white armband with a blue star, furs were confiscated in 1941, and Jews were repeatedly seized for forced labour. The Jewish population grew during the occupation as refugees arrived from Kraków, Tarnów, Gorlice and Jasło, and the Jewish Self-Help organisation (J.S.S.) assisted 200 Jews. In July 1942 (some sources give 12 August) the Jews of Jedlicze were rounded up by Ukrainian police and marched to nearby Krosno; two were killed in Jedlicze and many more died on the road. Only about 20 Jews from Jedlicze survived the war, some in hiding and others in Russia. Polish local-history accounts of the liquidation of the ghetto instead mention about 200 Jews being deported to Warzyce.

== Climate ==
Like nearby Krosno, Jedlicze lies on the boundary between an oceanic climate (Köppen climate classification: Cfb) and a humid continental climate (Dfb), depending on whether the −3 °C (27 °F) or the 0 °C (32 °F) isotherm is used. There is no weather station in the town itself, so the climate data below is taken from the nearest long-term station, at Krosno, about 10 km away, and may differ slightly from conditions in Jedlicze. Winters are cold and snowy, summers are warm, and rainfall peaks from May to August.

At Krosno the warmest month is July, with a mean daily temperature of 18.7 °C, and the coldest is January, at −2.2 °C. The 1991–2020 annual mean is 8.6 °C. The station averages about 758 mm of precipitation a year, with July the wettest month (105.6 mm) and January the driest (37.7 mm). Snow cover lies on about 73 days a year, almost all of them between November and March, and the station records about 1,789 hours of sunshine annually.

Krosno

Climate chart (precipitation, max. and min. temperature)
J	F	M	A	M	J	J	A	S	O	N	D
38 0 −5	39 2 −4	38 7 0	53 14 4	95 19 9	93 22 12	106 24 14	75 24 14	77 19 10	62 13 6	44 7 2	40 1 −3
- █ Average max. and min. temperatures in °C
- █ Precipitation totals in mm
Imperial conversion
J	F	M	A	M	J	J	A	S	O	N	D
1.5 32 24	1.5 36 26	1.5 45 31	2.1 58 40	3.7 66 48	3.6 72 54	4.2 75 57	3 75 56	3 65 49	2.4 55 42	1.7 45 35	1.6 35 26
- █ Average max. and min. temperatures in °F
- █ Precipitation totals in inches

Climate data for Krosno (1991–2020 normals, extremes 1961–2021)
Month	Jan	Feb	Mar	Apr	May	Jun	Jul	Aug	Sep	Oct	Nov	Dec	Year
Record high °C (°F)	13.5 (56.3)	16.4 (61.5)	23.0 (73.4)	28.1 (82.6)	30.5 (86.9)	33.2 (91.8)	34.3 (93.7)	34.3 (93.7)	34.5 (94.1)	25.5 (77.9)	23.5 (74.3)	14.9 (58.8)	34.5 (94.1)
Mean daily maximum °C (°F)	0.2 (32.4)	2.1 (35.8)	7.3 (45.1)	14.3 (57.7)	19.0 (66.2)	22.2 (72.0)	24.1 (75.4)	24.0 (75.2)	18.6 (65.5)	13.0 (55.4)	7.1 (44.8)	1.4 (34.5)	12.8 (55.0)
Daily mean °C (°F)	−2.2 (28.0)	−0.9 (30.4)	3.1 (37.6)	9.0 (48.2)	13.6 (56.5)	17.0 (62.6)	18.7 (65.7)	18.5 (65.3)	13.7 (56.7)	9.0 (48.2)	4.2 (39.6)	−0.9 (30.4)	8.6 (47.5)
Mean daily minimum °C (°F)	−4.6 (23.7)	−3.6 (25.5)	−0.4 (31.3)	4.2 (39.6)	8.7 (47.7)	12.2 (54.0)	13.8 (56.8)	13.5 (56.3)	9.5 (49.1)	5.8 (42.4)	1.7 (35.1)	−3.1 (26.4)	4.8 (40.6)
Record low °C (°F)	−29.9 (−21.8)	−36.9 (−34.4)	−29.9 (−21.8)	−9.8 (14.4)	−4.2 (24.4)	−2.2 (28.0)	3.0 (37.4)	0.8 (33.4)	−4.7 (23.5)	−8.0 (17.6)	−18.1 (−0.6)	−29.4 (−20.9)	−36.9 (−34.4)
Average precipitation mm (inches)	37.7 (1.48)	38.6 (1.52)	38.3 (1.51)	53.0 (2.09)	95.2 (3.75)	92.5 (3.64)	105.6 (4.16)	75.0 (2.95)	76.6 (3.02)	61.9 (2.44)	43.9 (1.73)	39.6 (1.56)	757.9 (29.84)
Average precipitation days (≥ 0.1 mm)	17.17	15.61	14.67	13.73	15.43	14.57	15.73	12.07	12.93	14.33	14.47	17.30	178.01
Average snowy days (≥ 0 cm)	20.6	19.4	8.9	1.1	0.0	0.0	0.0	0.0	0.0	0.5	5.3	17.0	72.8
Average relative humidity (%)	85.7	82.6	75.6	69.5	74.2	75.8	76.0	75.6	80.2	82.2	84.6	86.7	79.1
Mean monthly sunshine hours	62.6	72.1	125.2	181.6	224.6	229.2	246.1	243.1	164.0	120.0	69.1	51.4	1,788.9
Source 1: Institute of Meteorology and Water Management
Source 2: Meteomodel.pl (records, relative humidity 1991–2020)

== Subdivisions ==
Jedlicze has three neighbourhoods (osiedla): Jedlicze-Centrum, Jedlicze-Męcinka and Jedlicze-Borek.

== Demographics ==
Since 2009 the population has stayed between about 5,500 and 5,800 inhabitants. On 1 January 2024 the town had 5,530 residents.

Population of Jedlicze
Year	Population
2009 (2 June)	5,645
2012	5,788
2014 (30 June)	5,766
2021 (31 March)	5,574
2024 (1 January)	5,530

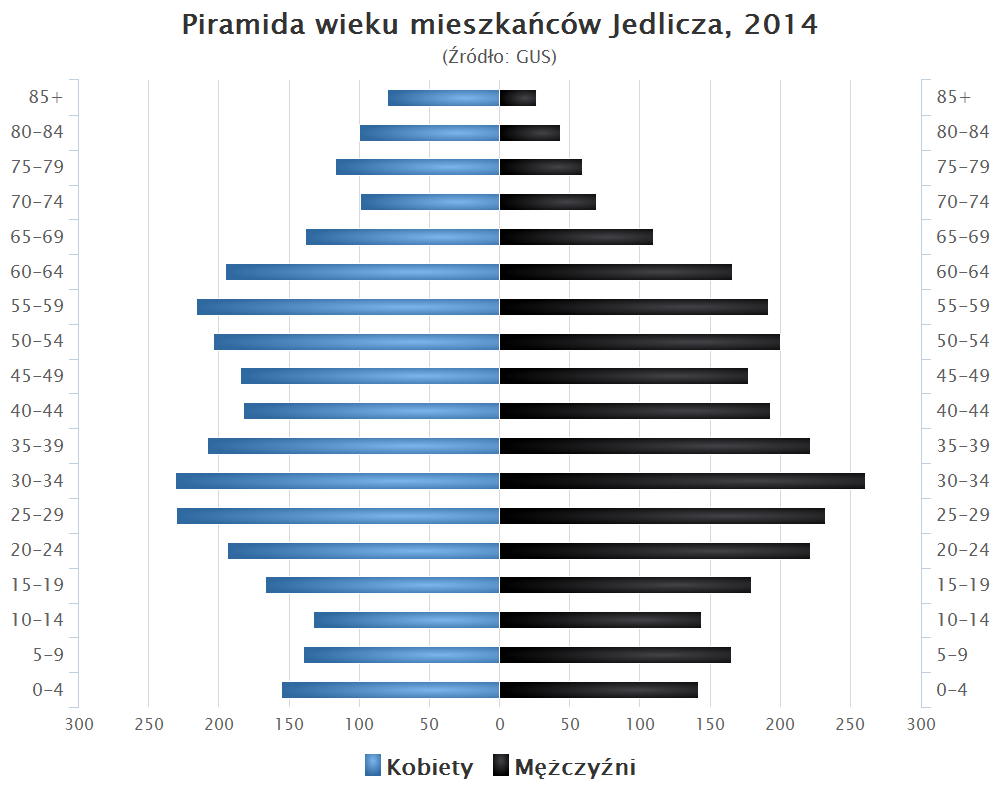
Age structure of the population of Jedlicze in 2014

== Economy ==
Jedlicze's economy has long been tied to oil refining. The refinery in Jedlicze was launched in 1899 by the Hanoverian Galician Oil Mining Association, where gasoline rectification and kerosene refining with sulfuric acid were carried out. In 1919 it was taken over by the Dąbrowa Oil Company, a limited partnership based in Drohobych. From 1939 to 1944 the plant was run by the German occupation authorities, and during the evacuation most of its equipment was dismantled and removed. Production resumed in 1945.

In 1963 the refinery became the first in Poland to begin regenerating waste oils, and in 2010 it received the "Teraz Polska" emblem for a waste-oil regeneration technology. In 1996 the state enterprise was transformed into the joint-stock company Rafineria Nafty Jedlicze; in 2011 the State Treasury sold its shareholding to PKN Orlen, which became the sole owner in 2012. On 5 January 2015 the company was merged into the Trzebinia Refinery, which was renamed ORLEN Południe.

== Gmina ==
Jedlicze is the seat of the urban-rural Gmina Jedlicze, which covers 58.21 km² (in 2002, 79% of it agricultural land and 10% forest) and had 14,852 inhabitants in 2024. Besides the town it has ten villages with the status of sołectwo: Chlebna, Długie, Dobieszyn, Jaszczew, Moderówka, Piotrówka, Podniebyle, Poręby, Potok and Żarnowiec. From 1975 to 1998 the gmina belonged to the Krosno Voivodeship.

== Sights ==
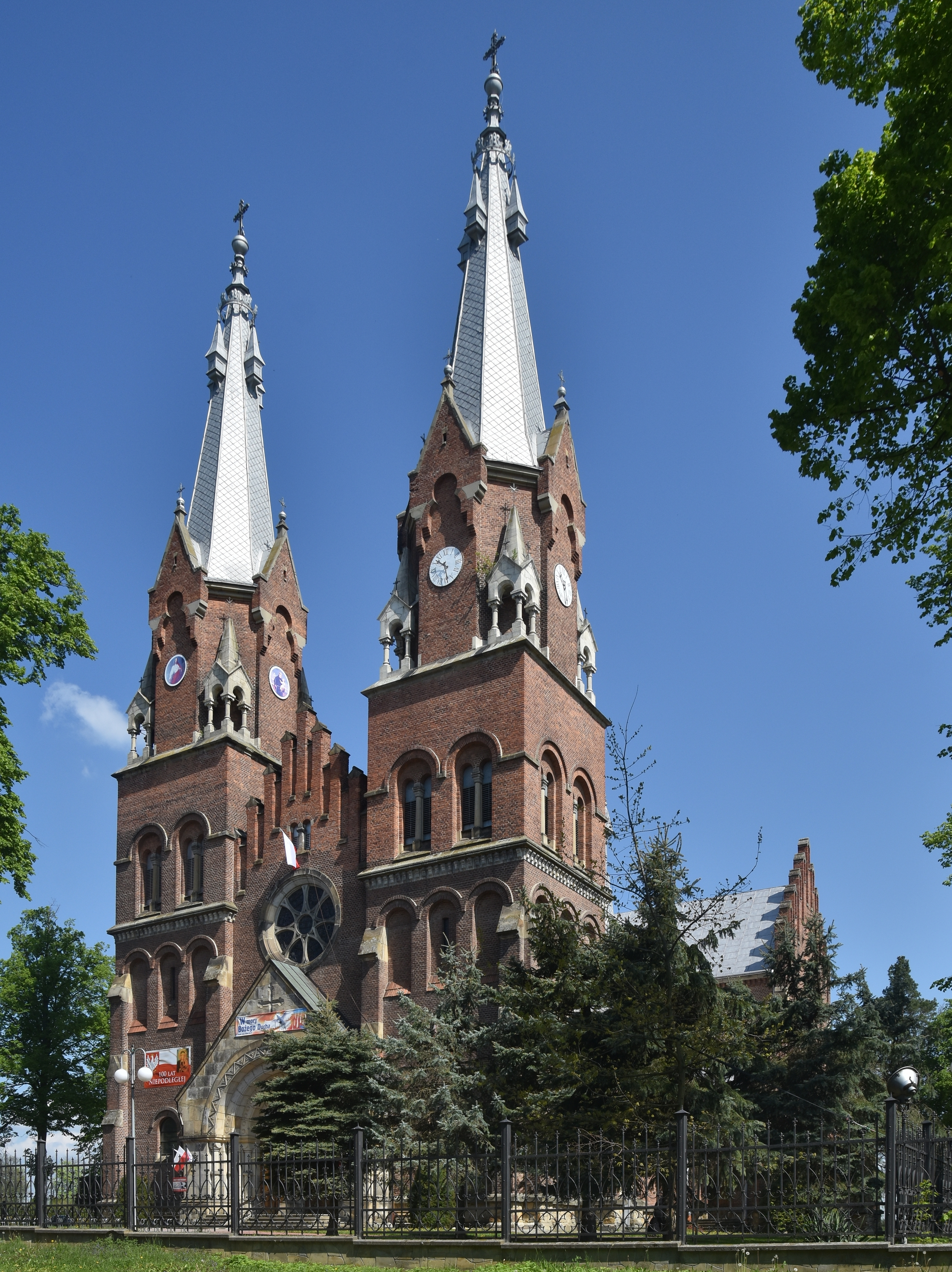
Neo-Gothic church of Saint Anthony

The parish church of Saint Anthony of Padua is a neo-Gothic building erected in 1911–1925 to a design by the Lwów architect Jan Sas-Zubrzycki; it was consecrated on 18 October 1925.

The Stawiarski Palace was built in 1921–1925, next to an older 18th-century manor house, for the oil-industrialist Stawiarski family, also to a design by Sas-Zubrzycki. It is a two-storey brick building with a high basement and a broken multi-hipped roof. It stands in a landscape park laid out in the first half of the 19th century, with old oaks, hornbeams, ash trees, lime trees and a multi-stemmed sycamore maple; the park has a nature trail. The palace complex is entered in the register of monuments. During the Second World War the Germans used part of the palace as a residence for occupation officials; towards the end of the war it was occupied by Soviet and then Polish troops, which contributed to its damage. After the war, with no heirs left, the authorities allowed the local gymnasium to move in; following a thorough renovation in the first half of 1946 the school was formally relocated on 30 May 1946, and the Maria Konopnicka General Secondary School has been based in the palace ever since.

Also worth noting is the neo-Gothic cemetery chapel (1864). Buried in the local cemetery are two daughters of Maria Konopnicka, Laura Pytlińska (died 1935) and Zofia Konopnicka-Mickiewiczowa (died 1956), as well as the family of Edmund Karol Łoziński and the family of the film director Wojciech Smarzowski. Stanisław Betlej, the Home Army commander, is also buried there, and the cemetery contains a mass grave of 22 unidentified patriots shot by the Germans. The actress Wanda Siemaszkowa (died 1947) was also buried here.

In the nearby village of Żarnowiec stands an 18th-century manor house, rebuilt at the end of the 19th century, which together with its park of more than three hectares was presented to Maria Konopnicka as a gift from the Polish nation in 1903, on the 25th anniversary of her literary work. She moved in on 8 September 1903 with the painter Maria Dulębianka, and the two spent the spring and summer months there. After the writer's death the manor stayed with her family until 1956, when her daughter Zofia Mickiewiczowa (shortly before her death) and the other heirs donated it, with the park, to the Polish nation. During the German occupation Zofia sheltered and supported partisans, and for a time the manor housed the Krosno inspectorate of the Home Army; in 1943 a wartime hospital was set up in it. The Maria Konopnicka Museum was established there in 1957, opened its exhibitions on 15 September 1960, and in 1991 the granary (lamus) in the park was opened for exhibitions and the museum's administration. The manor stands on a steep escarpment right next to the Jasiołka river.

Park and Stawiarski Palace

Cemetery chapel

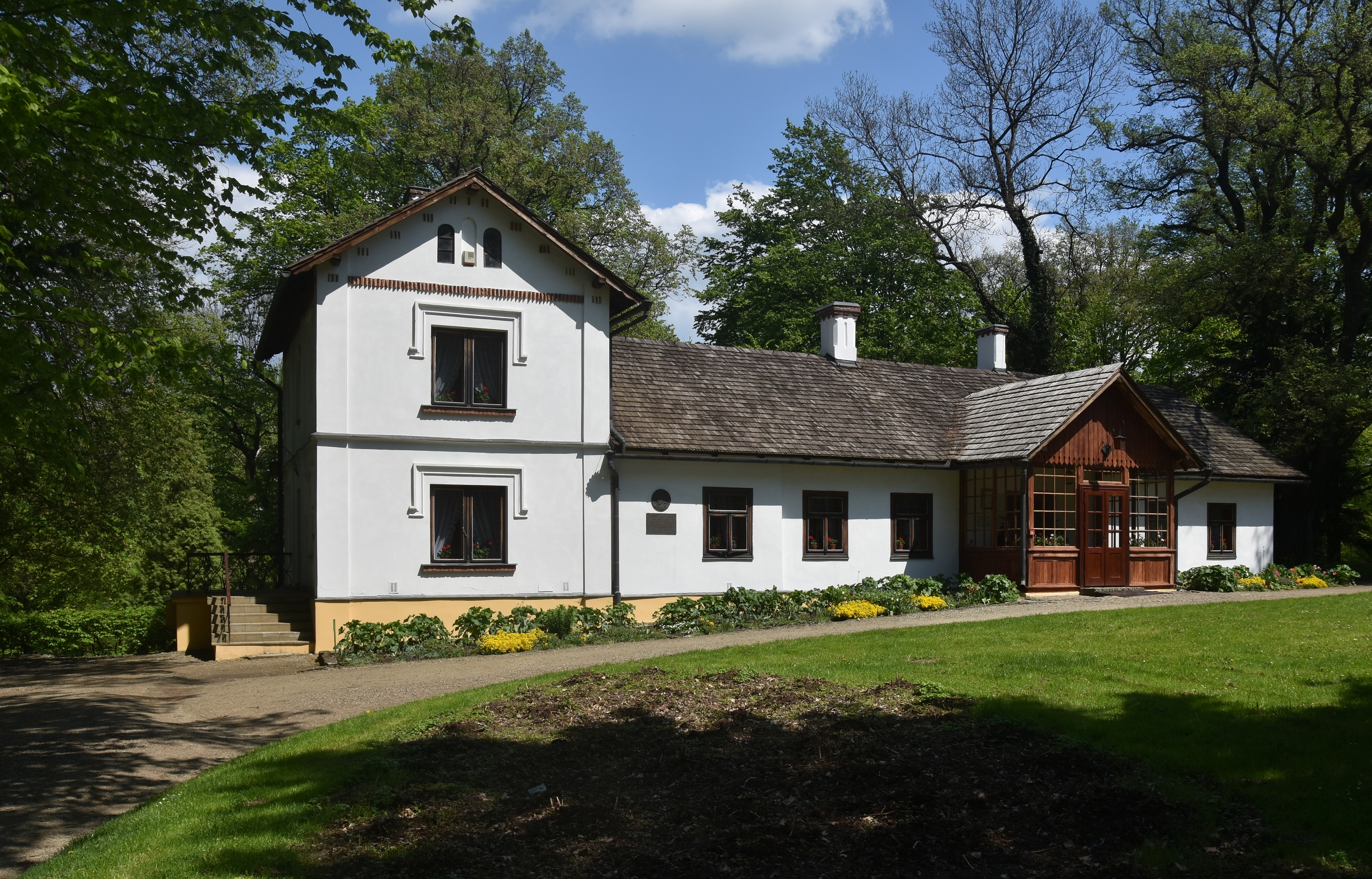
Konopnicka Museum manor in Żarnowiec

== Education and culture ==
Educational institutions in Jedlicze include a municipal kindergarten, the non-public kindergarten of the Michaelite Sisters, the Public School Complex (primary school and lower secondary school), the Maria Konopnicka General Secondary School and the Home Army School Complex. The town is also home to the Municipal Cultural Centre and the Kasper Wojnar Municipal Public Library.

== Religion ==
The Roman Catholic Parish of Saint Anthony of Padua in Jedlicze belongs to the Krosno I deanery of the Archdiocese of Przemyśl. The parish was erected in the first half of the 14th century. The first wooden church was rebuilt before 1595 but burned down in 1712; a new wooden church funded by Remigiusz Wielowiejski was built in 1740 and consecrated in 1855 by Bishop Franciszek Wierzchlejski. The present brick church was built in 1911–1925, damaged in 1944 and renovated in 1947–1949. In 2015/2016 the parish had 7,250 members, of whom 5,310 lived in Jedlicze, 675 in Chlebna, 691 in Długie and 374 in Poręby.

Parish priests have included:

- Michał Sawiczewski (to 1841)
- Franciszek Wincenty Szaynok (from 1841)
- Antoni Dutkiewicz (to 1876)
- Edward Janicki (1876–1915)
- Stanisław Nowrocki (1915–1928)
- Adam Chlebiński (1928–1929)
- Leon Bobola (1929–1932)
- Wincenty Grzyb (1932–1947)
- Jan Bazan (1947–1949)
- Stanisław Szpytma (1949–1982)
- Zbigniew Nowak (1982–1985)
- Stanisław Guzik (1985–2007)
- Stanisław Turoń (2007–2020)
- Tadeusz Dec (from 2020)

Jehovah's Witnesses also have a congregation in Jedlicze.

== Transport ==
Jedlicze railway station

Jedlicze can be reached by Krosno city bus lines 2, 11 and 16 and the night line N1; minibuses also serve the town. It can also be reached by rail from Jasło and from Sanok: Jedlicze railway station lies on railway line no. 108 (Stróże–Krościenko), between Jedlicze Męcinka and Krosno Turaszówka. The station has one platform and no ticket office, and records roughly 10–19 passengers a day (2017 and 2022).

== Sport ==
The local football club is ZKS Nafta Jedlicze; its facilities include a stadium with an artificial-turf pitch and a sports hall. The town also has walking and cycling trails.

== Twin towns ==
- Mallersdorf-Pfaffenberg, Germany

== Notable people ==
- Kasper Wojnar (1871–1948), military officer, journalist and adult educator; the municipal library in Jedlicze is named after him
- Tadeusz Buczek (1904–1940), physician
- Stanisław Kochanek (1905–1995), painter and sculptor
- Mieczysław Goleń (1924–1979), politician
- Wacław Szklarski (1925–2021), general
- Maria Składanek (1932–2017), historian and Iranologist
- Jan Such (born 1948), volleyball player
- Wojciech Gęsiak (born 1954), architect
- Ryszard Bożek (born 1963), Catholic priest

Others associated with the town:

- Maria Konopnicka (1842–1910), poet and writer; her daughters are buried in the Jedlicze cemetery, and her manor house in nearby Żarnowiec is now a museum
- Stanisław Betlej (1910–1945), Home Army officer who commanded the Jedlicze outpost; buried in the town
- Wojciech Smarzowski (born 1963), film director, born in nearby Korczyna; his family is buried in Jedlicze
