= Polanka =

Polanka or Polánka may refer to places:

== Czech Republic ==
- Polánka, a municipality and village in the Plzeň Region
- Polánka, a village and part of Chotoviny in the South Bohemian Region
- Polánka, a village and part of Kasejovice in the Plzeň Region
- Polánka, a village and part of Krásné (Chrudim District) in the Pardubice Region
- Polánka, a village and part of Malešov in the Central Bohemian Region
- Polánka, a village and part of Vlašim in the Central Bohemian Region

== Poland ==
- Polanka, Lower Silesian Voivodeship (south-west Poland)
- Polanka, Lesser Poland Voivodeship (south Poland)
- Polanka, Masovian Voivodeship (east-central Poland)
- Polanka Wielka, seat of the Gmina Polanka Wielka
