= Gdański =

Gdański (femine: Gdańska, plural: Gdańscy) is a Polish-language toponymic literally meaning "of/from Gdańsk". It may refer to:

== Places ==
=== Pomerania, Poland ===
- Gdańsk County
- Uniwersytet Gdański, a public research university located in Gdańsk, Poland
- Nowy Dwór Gdański, a town in the Żuławy Wiślane
- Pruszcz Gdański, a town in Pomerania
- Starogard Gdański, a town in Pomerania

=== Warsaw, Poland ===
- Gdański Bridge, a bridge across the Vistula in Warsaw, Poland
- Warszawa Gdańska station, Dworzec Gdański, a railway station in northern Warsaw, Poland
- Dworzec Gdański metro station, a station on Line M1 of the Warsaw Metro

=== Bydgoszcz, Poland ===
- Gdańska Street in Bydgoszcz

== People ==
- Carlos Gdansky Orgambide (born 1930), Argentine film director and screenwriter
- Jacek Gdański (born 1970), Polish chess player
- Pedro Isaac Gdansky Orgambide (1929-2003), Argentine writer
- Mściwój I Gdański, (c. 1160–1219 or 1220), Prince of Pomerelia
- Sambor I Gdański, (c. 1150–c. 1207), regent of Pomerelia

== Other uses ==
- Mendel Gdański, a fictional character from short story by Maria Konopnicka

== See also ==
- Danziger (disambiguation)
