= Statue of Maria Konopnicka (Warsaw) =

Monument in Warsaw, Poland

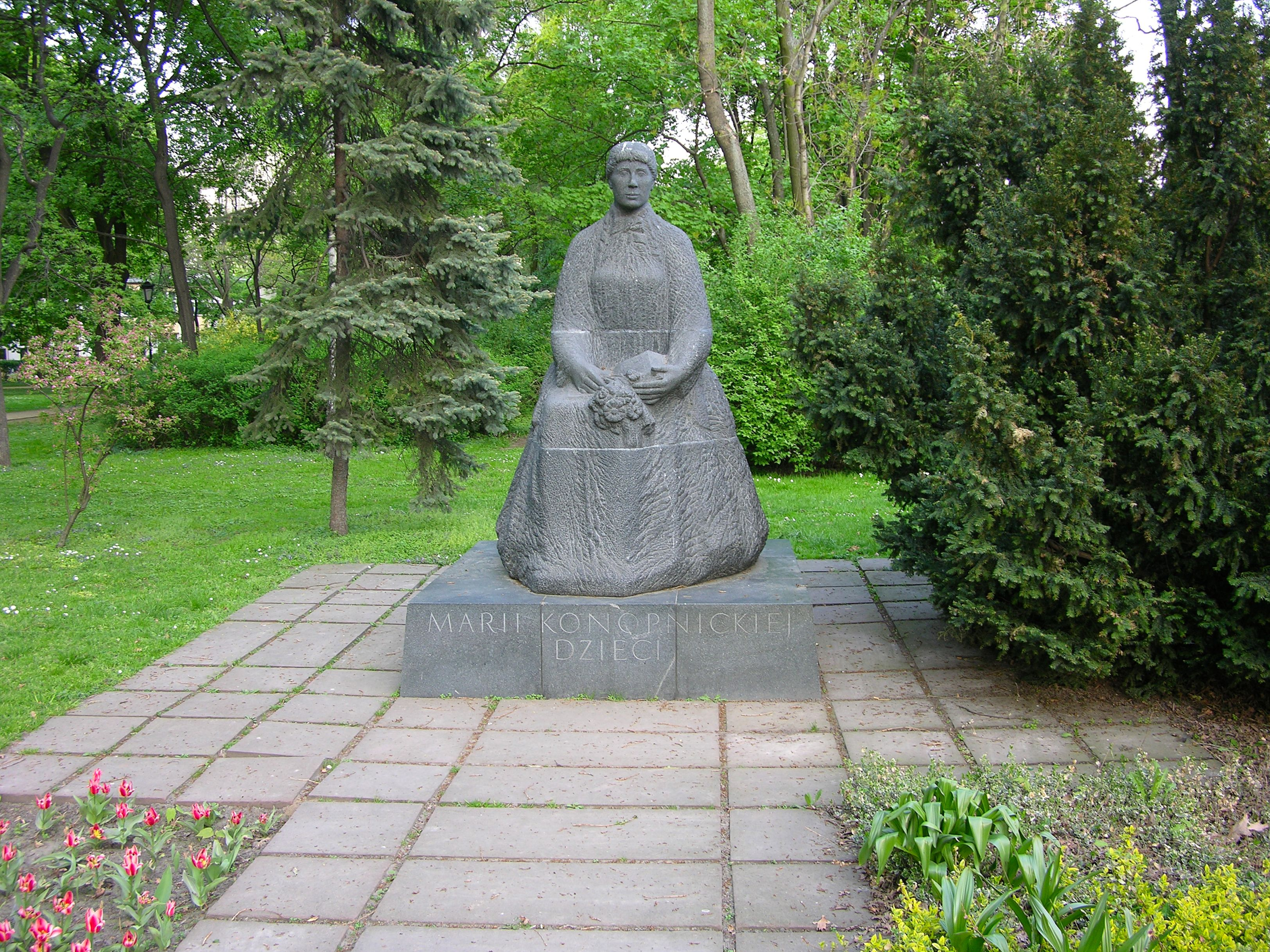
- The monument in 2011.
- Interactive map of Statue of Maria Konopnicka
- Location: Saxon Garden, Downtown, Warsaw, Poland
- Coordinates: 52°14′29.4″N 21°00′21.3″E
- Designer: Stanisław Kulon
- Type: Statue
- Material: Syenite
- Opening date: 22 May 1966
- Dedicated to: Maria Konopnicka

Maria Konopnicka Monument (Polish: Pomnik Marii Konopnickiej) is a syenite statue in Warsaw, Poland, within the Saxon Garden in the Downtown district. It is dedicated to Maria Konopnicka, a 19th- and 20th-century poet, novelist, children's writer, and activist for women's rights and the independence of Poland. It was designed by Stanisław Kulon and unveiled on 22 May 1966.

== History ==
The monument dedicated to Maria Konopnicka was proposed by the students of the Primary School no. 11 in Kalisz, whose appeal was publicised in children's biweekly magazine Płomyczek. It led to people from across the country donating money to the cause, collecting around 600,000 zloties.

The monument was made by sculptor Stanisław Kulon and unveiled on 22 May 1966, a day prior to the 124th anniversary of Konopnicka's birth. For his work, the sculptor was awarded with the Honorary Badge of Merit to Warsaw.

== Characteristics ==
The monument is located in the northwestern portion of the Saxon Garden. It consists of a syenite statue depicting Maria Konopnicka in a sitting position. It is placed on a low pedestal. It bears three Polish inscriptions, which are

- on the front: Marii Konopnickiej – dzieci (translation: To Maria Konopnicka, the children);
- on the right: Odsłonięty 22 maja 1966 roku (translation: Unveiled on 22 May 1966)
- and on the left: Pomnik ufundowany ze składek dzieci staraniem redakcji „Płomyczka” i Towarzystwa im. Marii Konopnickiej (translation: The monument was founded by children's donations with the help of the editors of Płomyczek and the Maria Konopnicka Association).
