= Gmina Jedlicze =

Gmina Jedlicze Jedlicze Commune
- Gmina
- Flag Coat of arms
- Interactive map of Gmina Jedlicze
- Coordinates (Jedlicze): 49°42′59″N 21°38′44″E
- Country: Poland
- Voivodeship: Subcarpathian
- County: Krosno County
- Seat: Jedlicze

Area
  - Total: 58.21 km^{2} (22.48 sq mi)

Population (2006)
  - Total: 15,027
  - Density: 258.2/km^{2} (668.6/sq mi)
  - Urban: 5,593
  - Rural: 9,434
- Website: http://www.jedlicze.pl/

Gmina Jedlicze is an urban-rural gmina (administrative district) in Krosno County, Subcarpathian Voivodeship, in south-eastern Poland. Its seat is the town of Jedlicze, which lies approximately 9 kilometres (6 mi) north-west of Krosno and 44 km (27 mi) south-west of the regional capital Rzeszów.

The gmina covers an area of 58.21 square kilometres (22.5 sq mi), and as of 2006 its total population is 15,027 (out of which the population of Jedlicze amounts to 5,593, and the population of the rural part of the gmina is 9,434).

== Villages ==
Apart from the town of Jedlicze, Gmina Jedlicze contains the villages and settlements of Chlebna, Długie, Dobieszyn, Jaszczew, Moderówka, Piotrówka, Podniebyle, Poręby, Potok and Żarnowiec.

== Neighbouring gminas ==
Gmina Jedlicze is bordered by the city of Krosno and by the gminas of Chorkówka, Jasło, Tarnowiec and Wojaszówka.
