= Mendel Gdański =

Short story by Maria Konopnicka

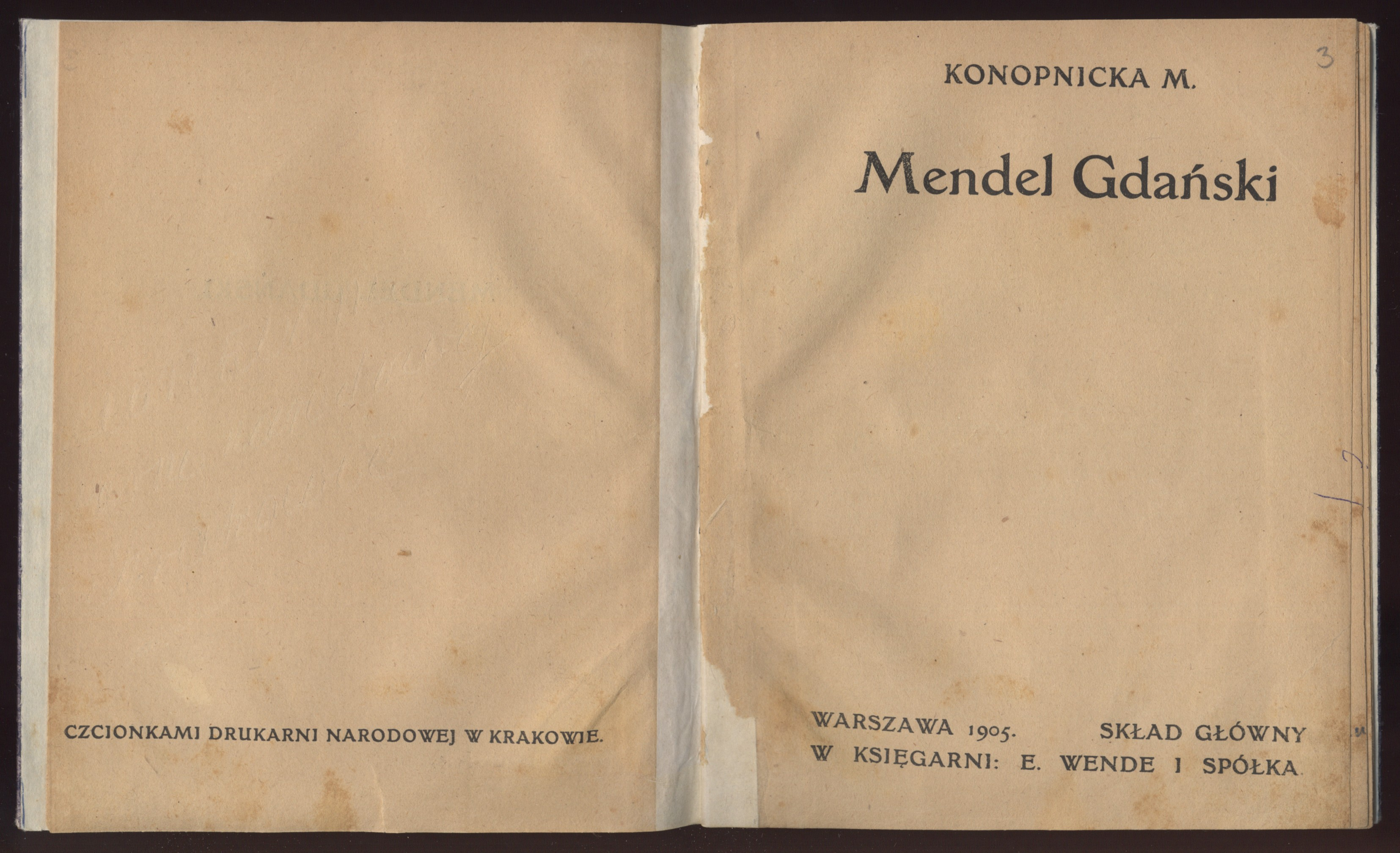

Mendel Gdański is a short story by Polish poet and short-story writer Maria Konopnicka published for the first time in 1890 in the Przegląd Literacki magazine. After three years it was published again in her poetry collection Na drodze ("On the Road").

The main reason for Maria Konopnicka's writing Mendel Gdański was the prevailing outbreak of anti-Semitism in Poland at that time. The opus tackles the matter remarkably current in the late 19th century of the assimilation of ethnic minorities. One of the people that inspired the author to write Mendel Gdański was a Polish writer Eliza Orzeszkowa who sent a letter to Konopnicka, in which she asked "in prose or in verse, write one or ten pages, your word carries much weight, many will find hope, it will inspire good emotions, and quench the bad…" (" czy prozą, czy wierszem, napisz jedną lub dziesięć kartek, słowo Twoje wiele zaważy, u wielu wiarę znajdzie, wiele uczuć wzbudzi, złych uśpi…").

== Content ==
The action takes place in the second half of 19th century in Warsaw. Mendel, an old Jew observes the traffic and the passers-by. Not only does he know all the people passing on the street, but also they all know him too. Mendel works as a bookbinder. He has been living in Poland from the very beginning of his life and he has always viewed himself as Polish. He lives a peaceful, calm life and cares for his ten-year-old grandson Kuba, who is the apple of his eye. When one day the little boy returns from school without his cap and reveals that it was taken by a young hooligan, who bullied him for being a Jew; Mendel grows enraged. He explains to his grandson that they cannot be ashamed of their origin. Furthermore, in spite of being Jews, they still have the right to live in Warsaw, as they love it just as everyone else.

The next day Mendel is visited by a clockmaker admitting that the Jewish people are to be beaten in the city. Wishing not to scare the child, the old man endeavours not to display embarrassment. When asked by Mendel why the Jewish are to be attacked, the man replies that they were strangers. During a long and intricate dispute, the old Mendel manages to hold the clockmaker off, nonetheless the man does not seem to sympathise with Mendel's opinion. For him, "a Jew is always a Jew". Then, Mendel undertakes to explain why his last name is Gdański (meaning 'from Gdańsk'). He bears the surname as he has always associated it with the Poland, that his parents loved the most. Despite Mendel's efforts, the clockmaker leaves the property quickly.

That night, Mendel cannot sleep well. As Kuba leaves for school the next morning, a student catches him and admits, that the little boy is not allowed to leave, as the Jews are being beaten. Then, women come and advise to hang a picture of Saint Mary in front of the building, as only then Mendel and his family can be protected. In spite of his emotion, Mendel refuses and, praying and crying, approaches the window. The aggressors commence to attack but suddenly the student emerges and forbids them to assault the Jew. The enraged crowd scatters.

Finally, Mendel says that he has lost his love for the city, thus ending the story on a pessimistic note about how difficult it is for Jews to assimilate.

== See also ==
- Antisemitism
