= Maria Konopnicka =

Polish poet (1842–1910)

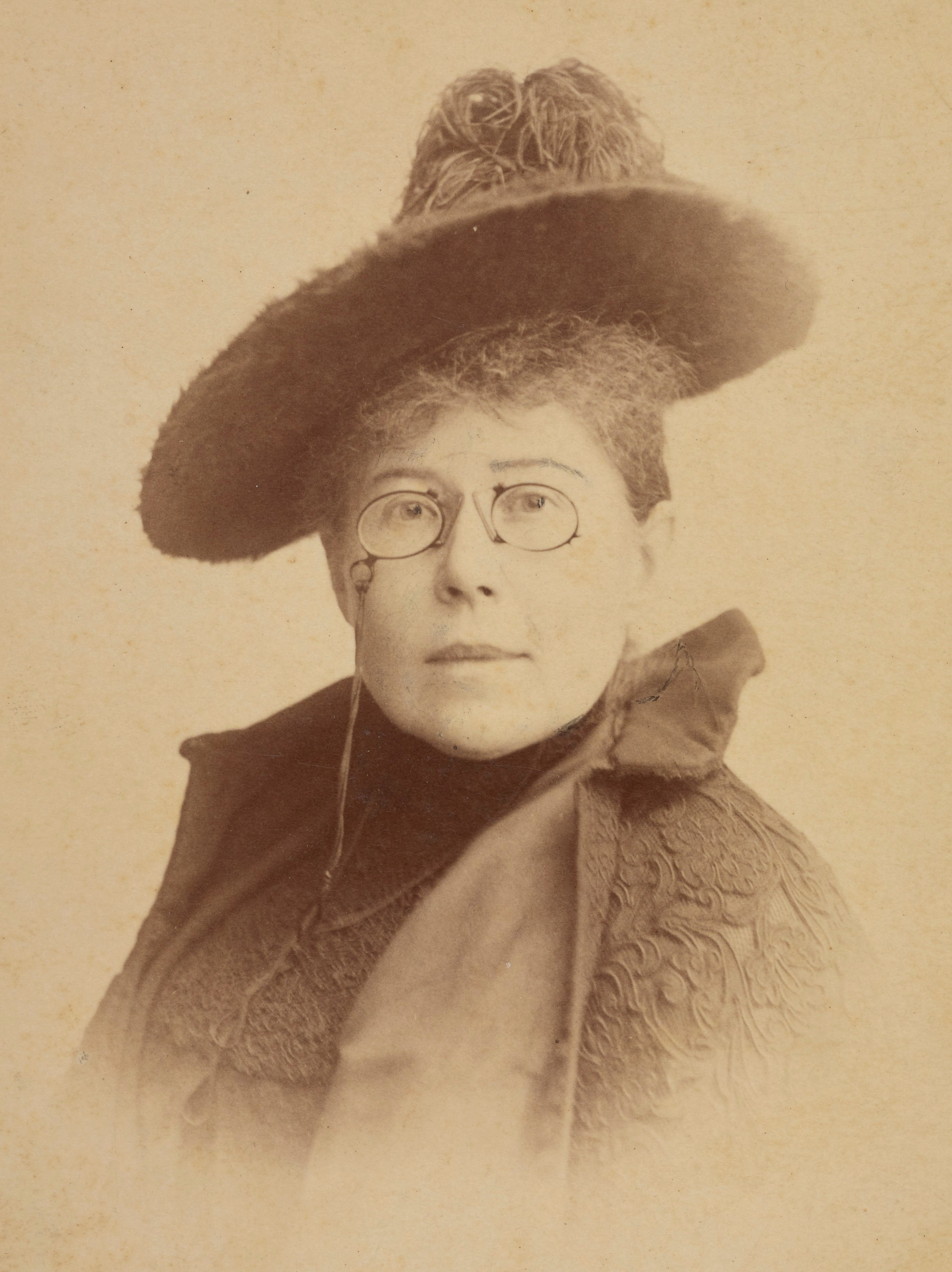
- Konopnicka in 1897
- Born: Maria Wasiłowska; 23 May 1842; Suwałki, Augustów Governorate, Congress Poland, Russian Empire
- Died: 8 October 1910 (aged 68); Lwów, Kingdom of Galicia and Lodomeria, Austria-Hungary
- Occupations: Writer, poet
- Writing career
- Pen name: Jan Sawa; Marko; Jan Waręż
- Genre: Realism
- Notable work: Rota

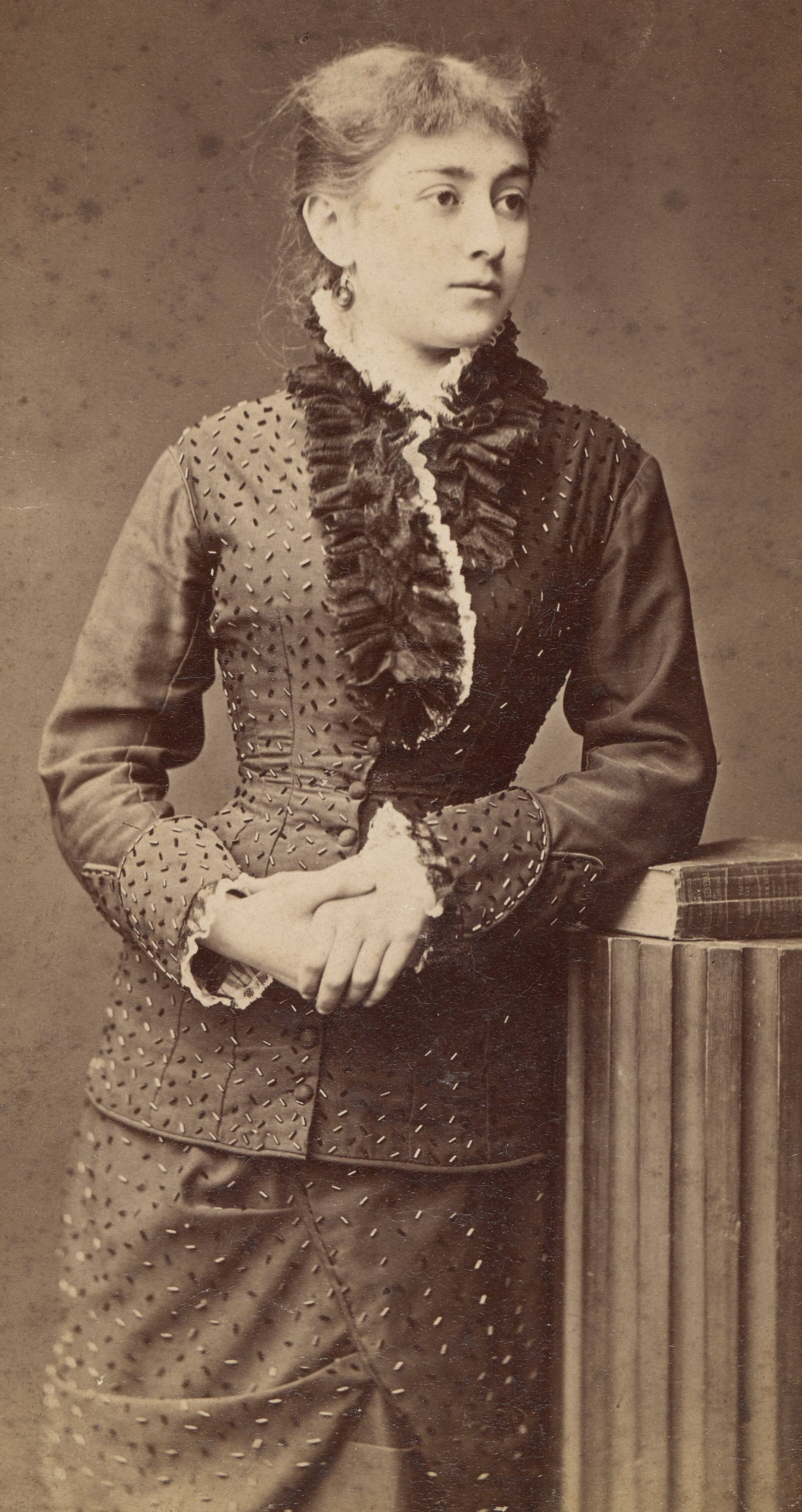
Maria Konopnicka circa 1875

Maria Konopnicka (Polish pronunciation: [ˈmarja kɔnɔpˈɲitska]; née Wasiłowska; (Note: Sometimes transliterated as Wasilowska) 23 May 1842 – 8 October 1910) was a Polish poet, novelist, children's writer, translator, journalist, critic and activist for women's rights and for Polish independence. She used pseudonyms, including Jan Sawa. She was one of the most important poets of Poland's Positivist period.

== Life ==
Konopnicka was born in Suwałki on 23 May 1842. Her father, Józef Wasiłowski, was a lawyer. She was home-schooled and spent a year (1855–56) at a convent pension of the Sisters of Eucharistic Adoration in Warsaw (Zespół klasztorny sakramentek w Warszawie).

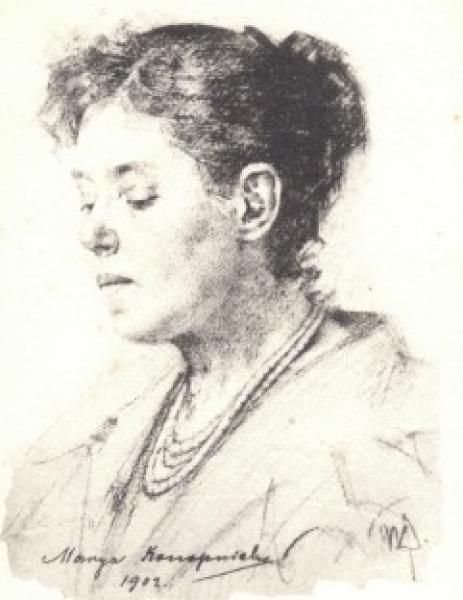
Konopnicka, by Maria Dulębianka, 1902

She made her debut as a writer in 1870 with the poem, "W zimowy poranek" ("On a Winter's Morn"). She gained popularity after the 1876 publication of her poem, "W górach" ("In the Mountains"), which was praised by future Nobel laureate Henryk Sienkiewicz.

In 1862 she married Jarosław Konopnicki. They had six children. The marriage was not a happy one as her husband disapproved of her writing career. In a letter to a friend, she described herself as "having no family" and as being "a bird locked in a cage". Eventually in 1878, in an unofficial separation, she left her husband and moved to Warsaw to pursue writing. She took her children with her. She would often travel in Europe; her first major trip was to Italy in 1883. She spent the years 1890–1903 living abroad in Europe.

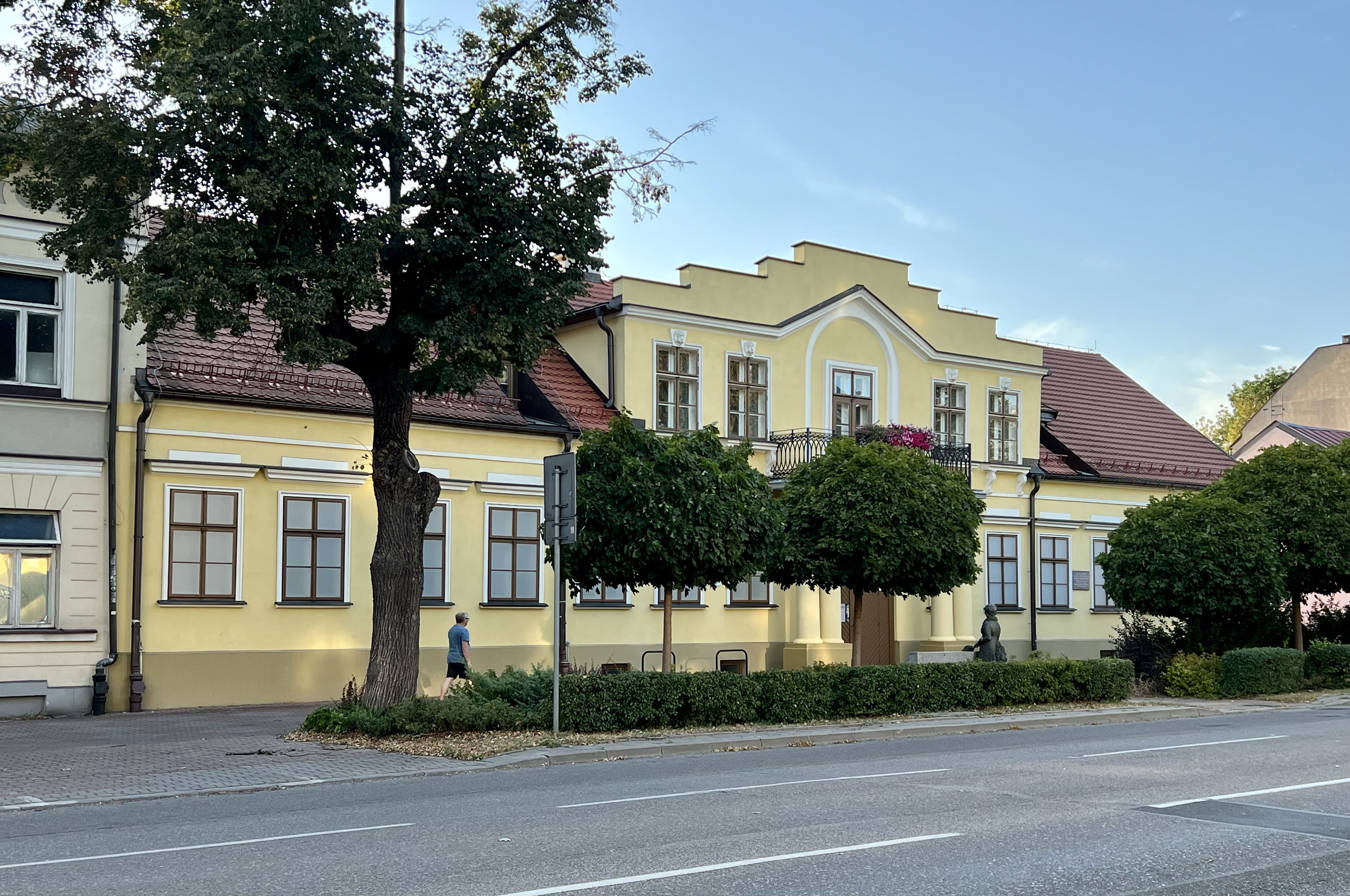
Birthplace and childhood home of Maria Konopnicka in Suwałki, currently a museum

Her life has been described as "turbulent", including extramarital romances, deaths, and mental illnesses in the family. She was a friend of a Polish woman poet of the Positivist period, Eliza Orzeszkowa, and of the painter and activist Maria Dulębianka.

In addition to being an active writer, she was also a social activist, organizing and participating in protests against the repression of ethnic (primarily Polish) and religious minorities in Prussia. She was also involved in women's-rights activism.

Her literary work in the 1880s gained wide recognition in Poland. In 1884 she began writing children's literature, and in 1888 she debuted as an adult-prose writer with

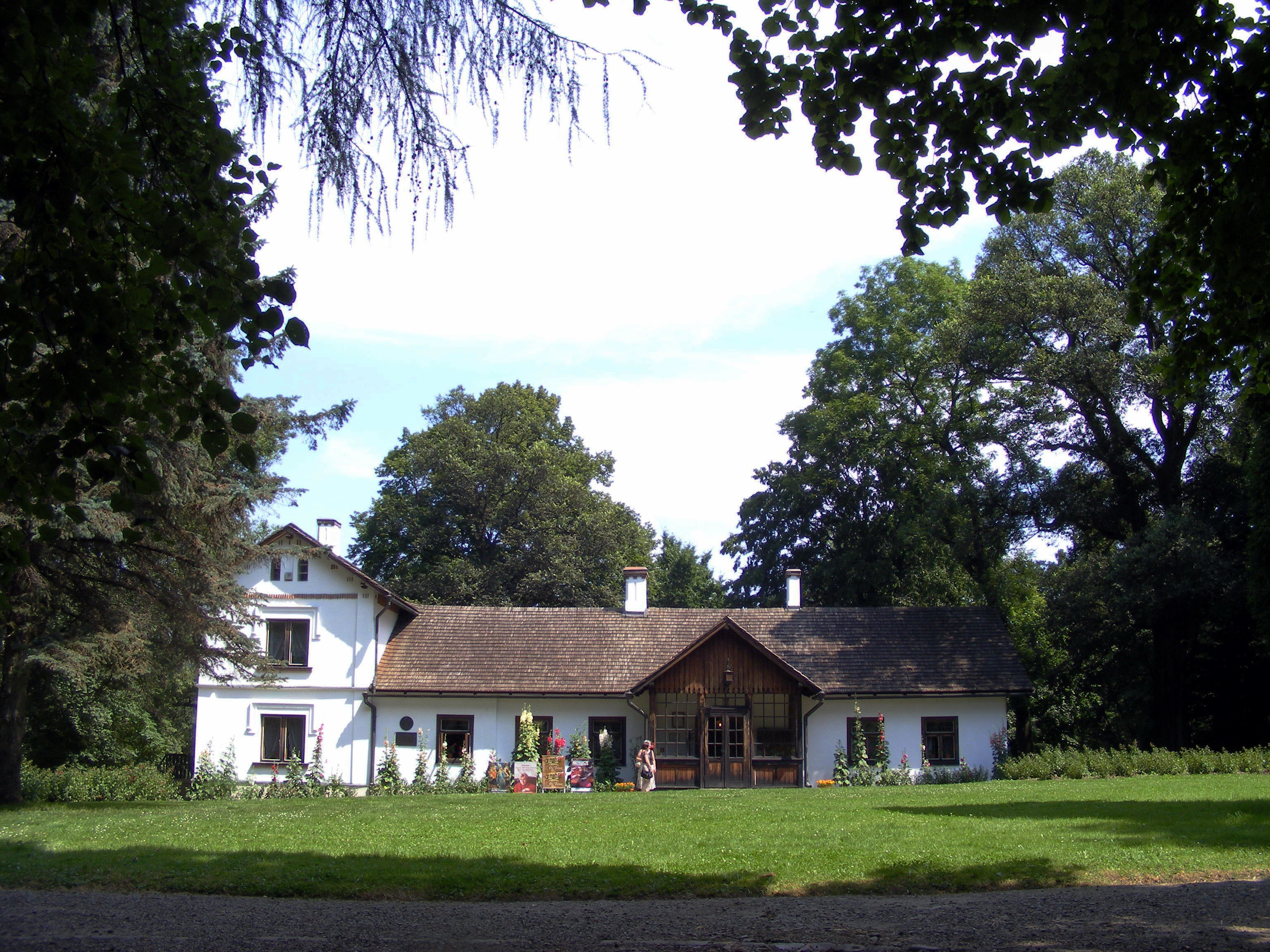
Konopnicka's country home, now a museum, in Żarnowiec

Cztery nowele (Four Short Stories). Due to the growing popularity of her writings, in 1902 a number of Polish activists decided to reward her by buying her a manor house. It was purchased with funds collected by a number of organizations and activists. As Poland was not an independent country at the time, and as her writings were politically uncongenial to the Prussian and Russian authorities, a location was chosen in the more tolerant Austrian partition of pre-Partition Poland. In 1903 she received a manor in Żarnowiec, where she arrived on 8 September. She would spend most springs and summers there, but she would still travel about Europe in fall and winter.

She died in Lwów (now Lviv, Ukraine) on 8 October 1910. She was buried there in the Łyczakowski Cemetery. As per her wish Dulębianka was laid to rest next to her.

== Work ==
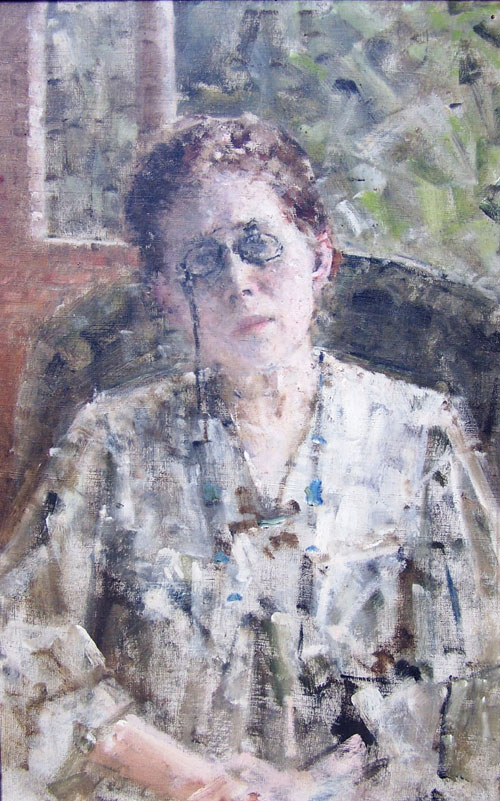
Konopnicka, by Maria Dulębianka, 1910

Konopnicka wrote prose (primarily short stories) as well as poems. One of her most characteristic styles were poems stylized as folk songs. She would try her hand at many genres of literature, such as reportage sketches, narrative memoirs, psychological portrait studies and others.

A common theme in her works was the oppression and poverty of the peasantry, workers, and Polish Jews. Due to her sympathy for Jewish people, she was considered a philosemite. Her works were also highly patriotic and nationalistic.

One of her best known works is the long epic in six cantos, Mister Balcer in Brazil (Pan Balcer w Brazylii, 1910), on the Polish emigrants in Brazil. Another one was Rota (Oath, 1908) which set to the music by Feliks Nowowiejski two years later became an unofficial anthem of Poland, particularly in the territories of the Prussian Partition. This patriotic poem was strongly critical of the Germanization policies and thus described as anti-German.

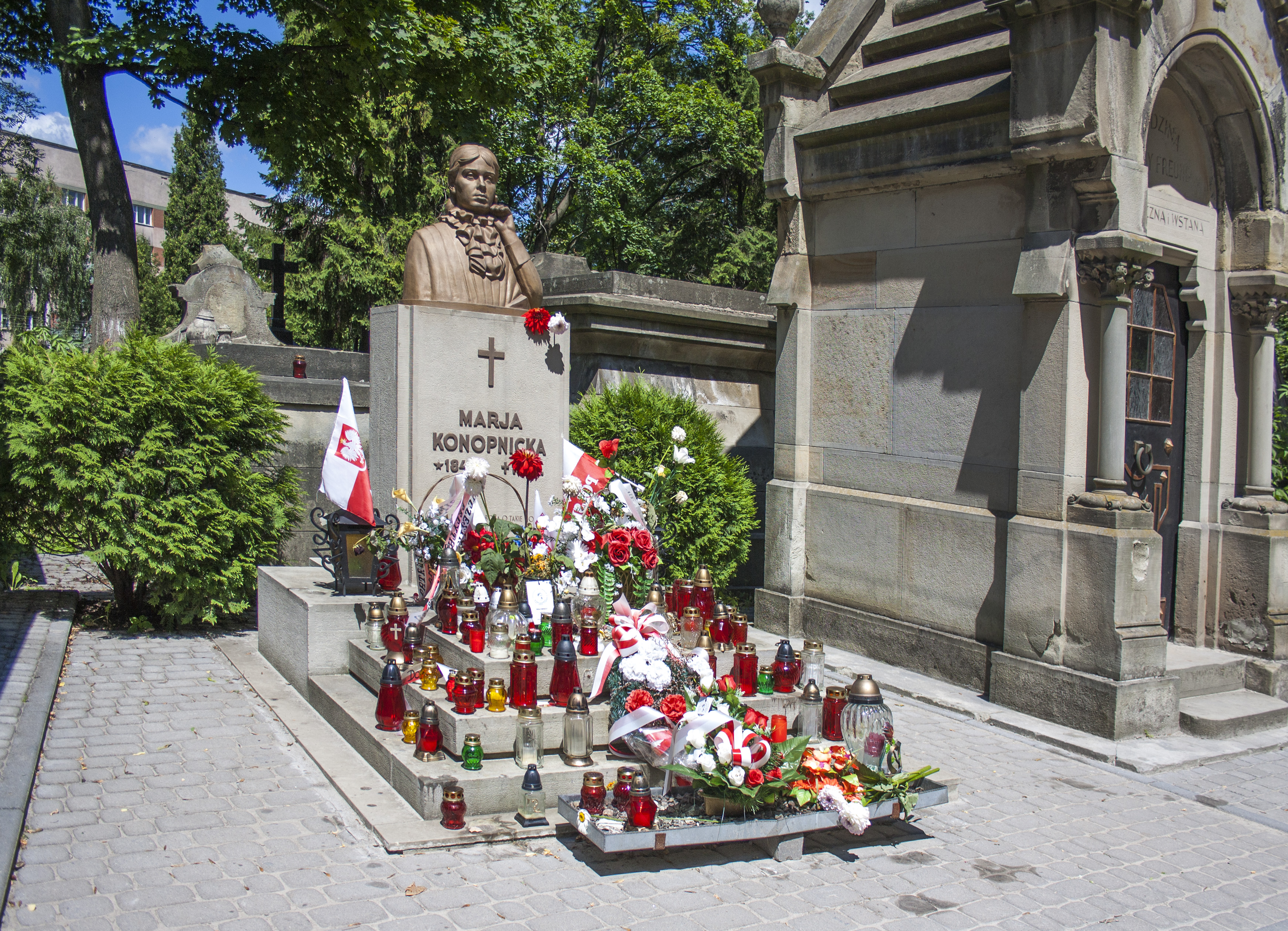
Konopnicka's grave in Lwów

Her most famous children's literature work is the 1896 O krasonoludkach i sierotce Marysi (Little Orphan Mary and the Gnomes). Her children literature works were well received, as compared to many other works of the period.

Maria Konopnicka also composed a poem about the execution of the Irish patriot, Robert Emmet. Emmet was executed by the British authorities in Dublin in 1803, but Konopnicka published her poem on the topic in 1908.

She was also a translator. Her translated works include Ada Negri's Fatalita and Tempeste, published in Poland in 1901.

== Memorials ==
- In 1922, the Maria Konopnicka Special Education School Complex was established in Pabianice.
- Poczta Polska featured her on a postage stamp in 1952.*
- Kononpnicka mansion in Żarnowiec was converted into a museum, opened in 1957, the Maria Konopnicka Museum in Żarnowiec (Muzeum Marii Konopnickiej w Żarnowcu). Another museum, the Maria Konopnicka Museum in Suwałki, was opened in 1973.
- A number of schools and other institutions, including several streets and plazas, bear her name in Poland. Polish Merchant Navy ship MS Maria Konopnicka was also named after her. Several plaques and monuments to her have been constructed. One of the most recent ones is a monument to her built in Suwałki in 2010. A crater on Venus was named after her in 1994.
- In Warsaw, in 2010 on the centenary of the poet's death, an International Maria Konopnicka Prize was created in recognition of organic work.
- Maria Konopnicka Monument, a syenite statue in Warsaw.
Selected monuments and memorials dedicated to Maria Konopnicka:

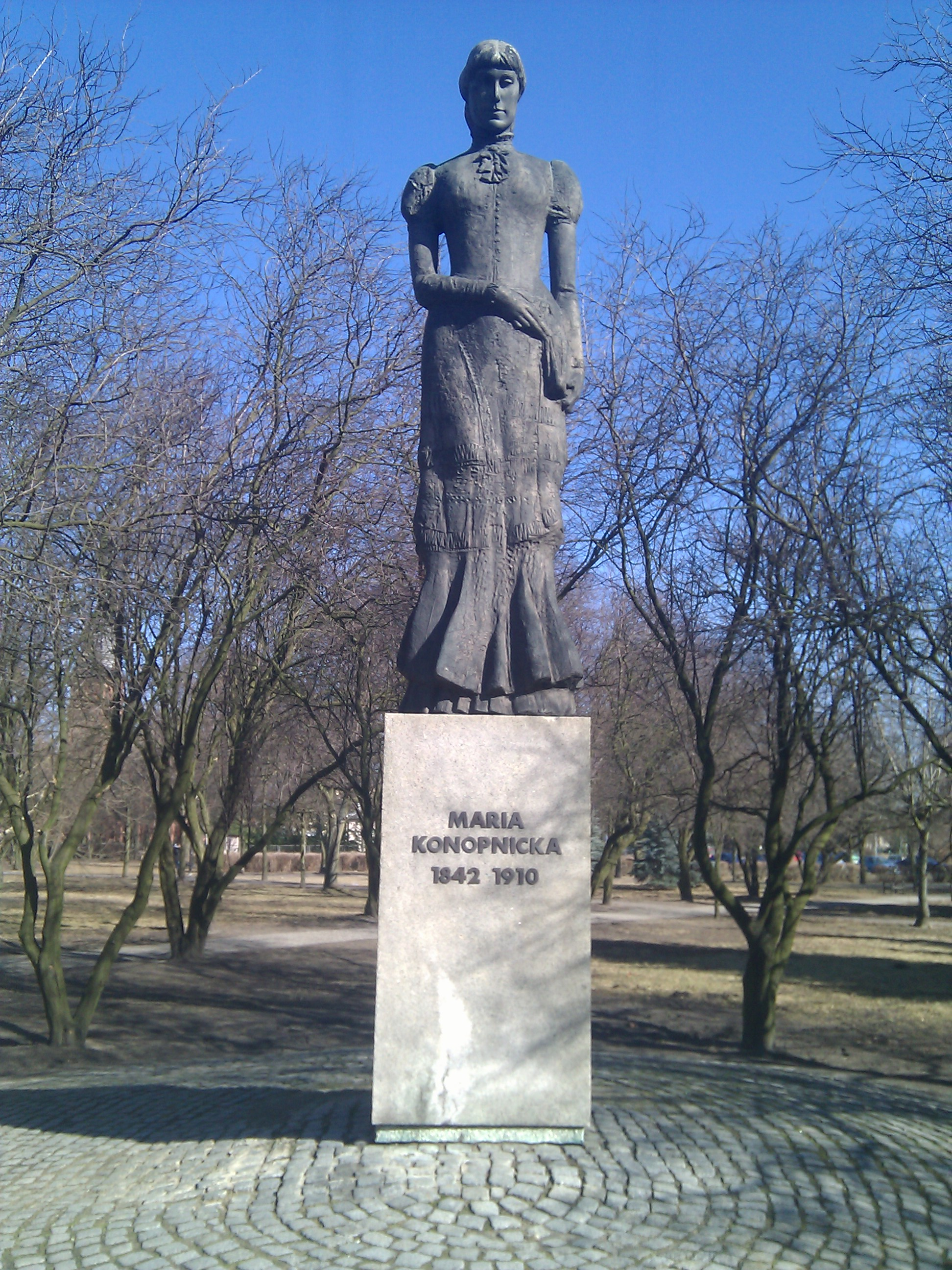
Maria Konopnicka Monument in Września

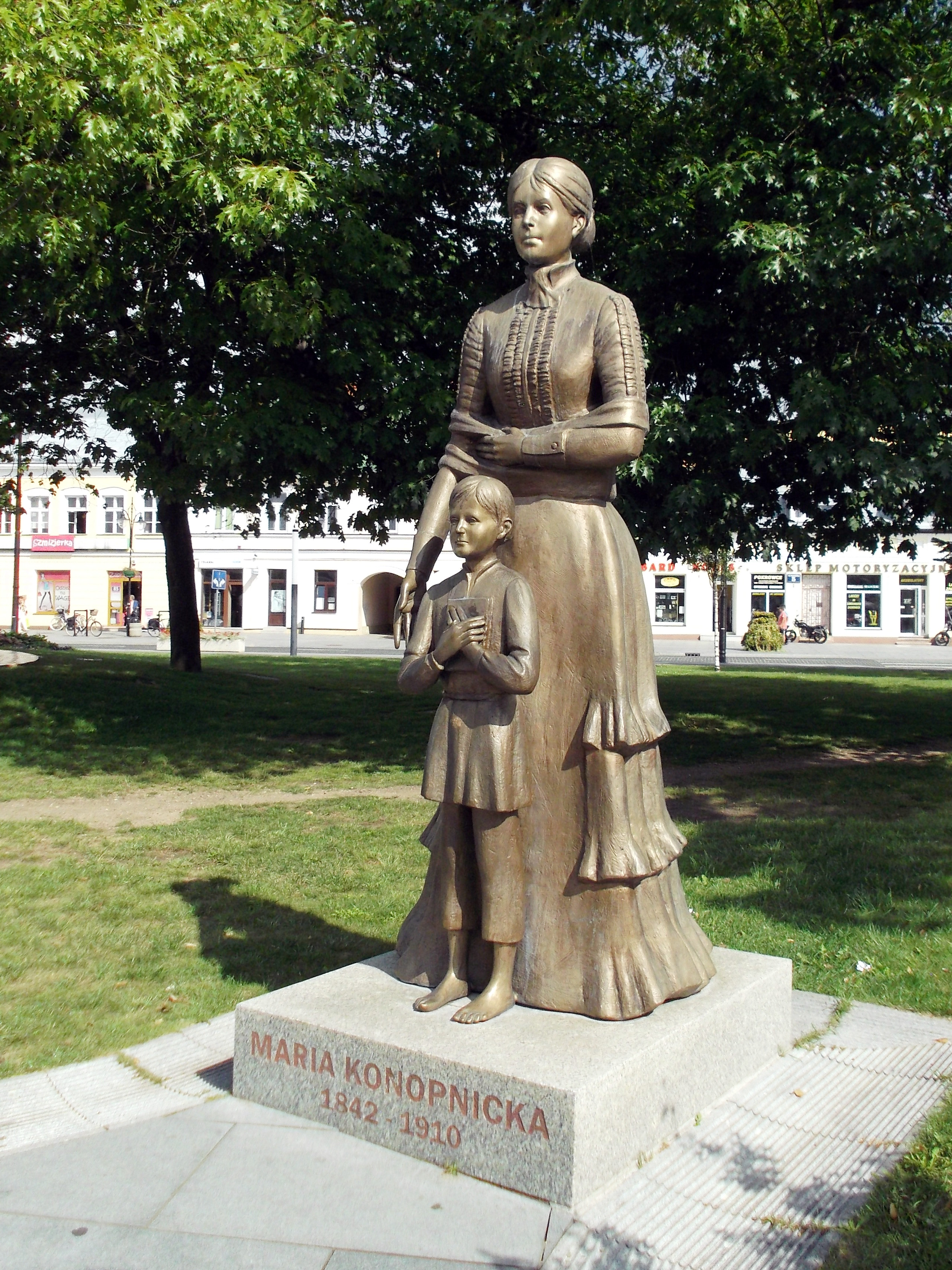
Statue in Suwałki

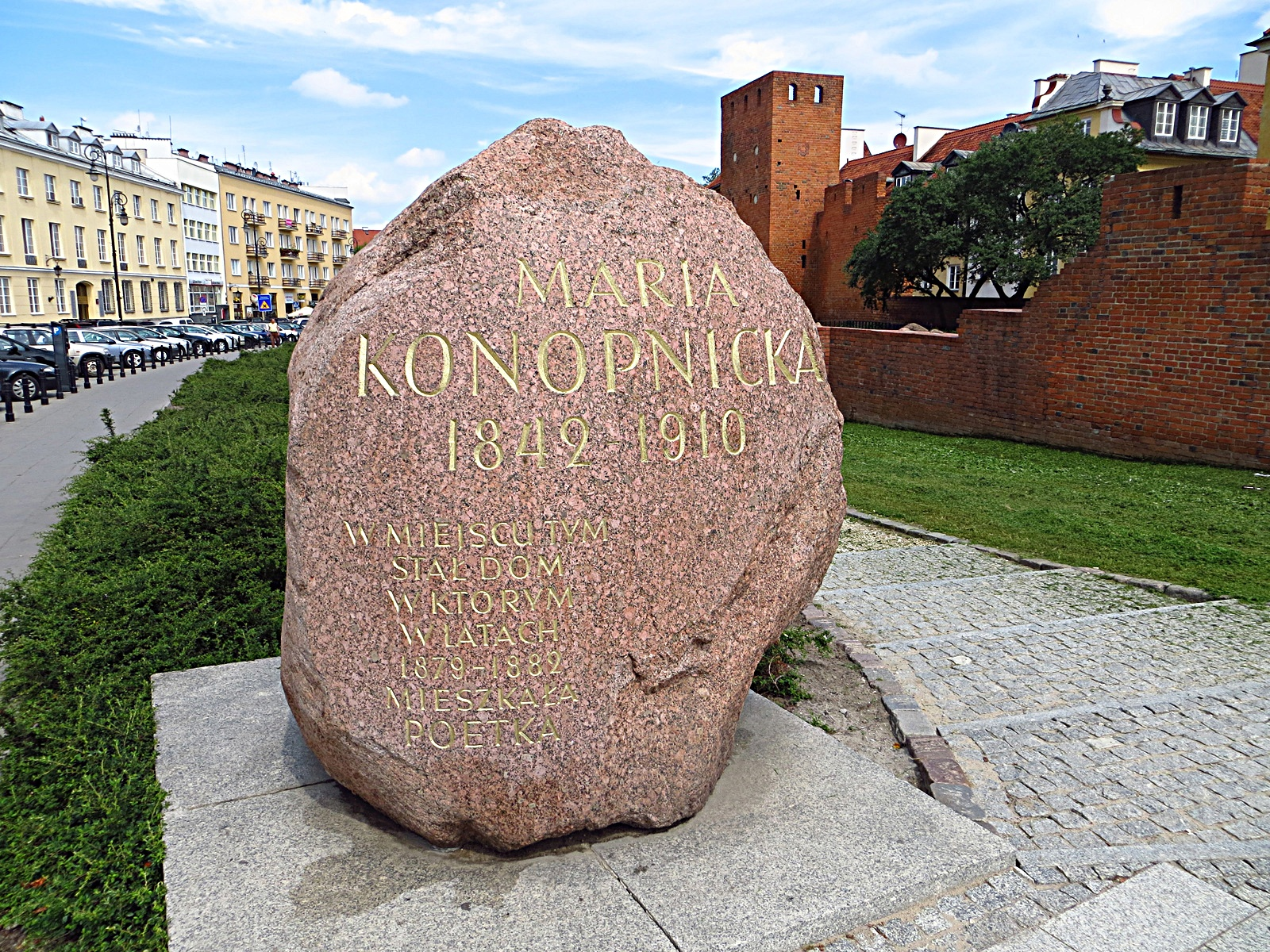
Memorial stone at the site of Konopnicka's former home in Warsaw

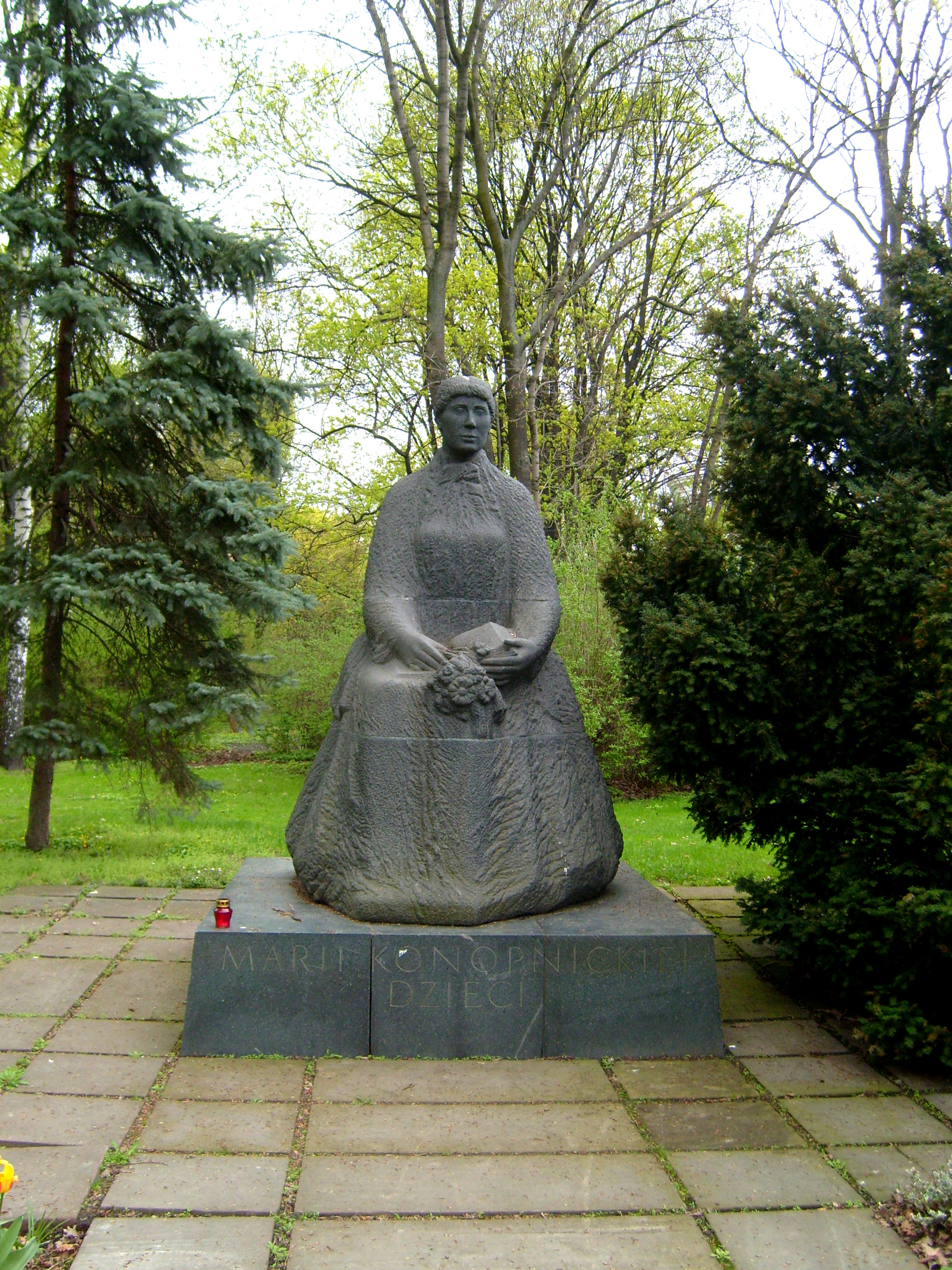
Statue in Warsaw's Saxon Garden

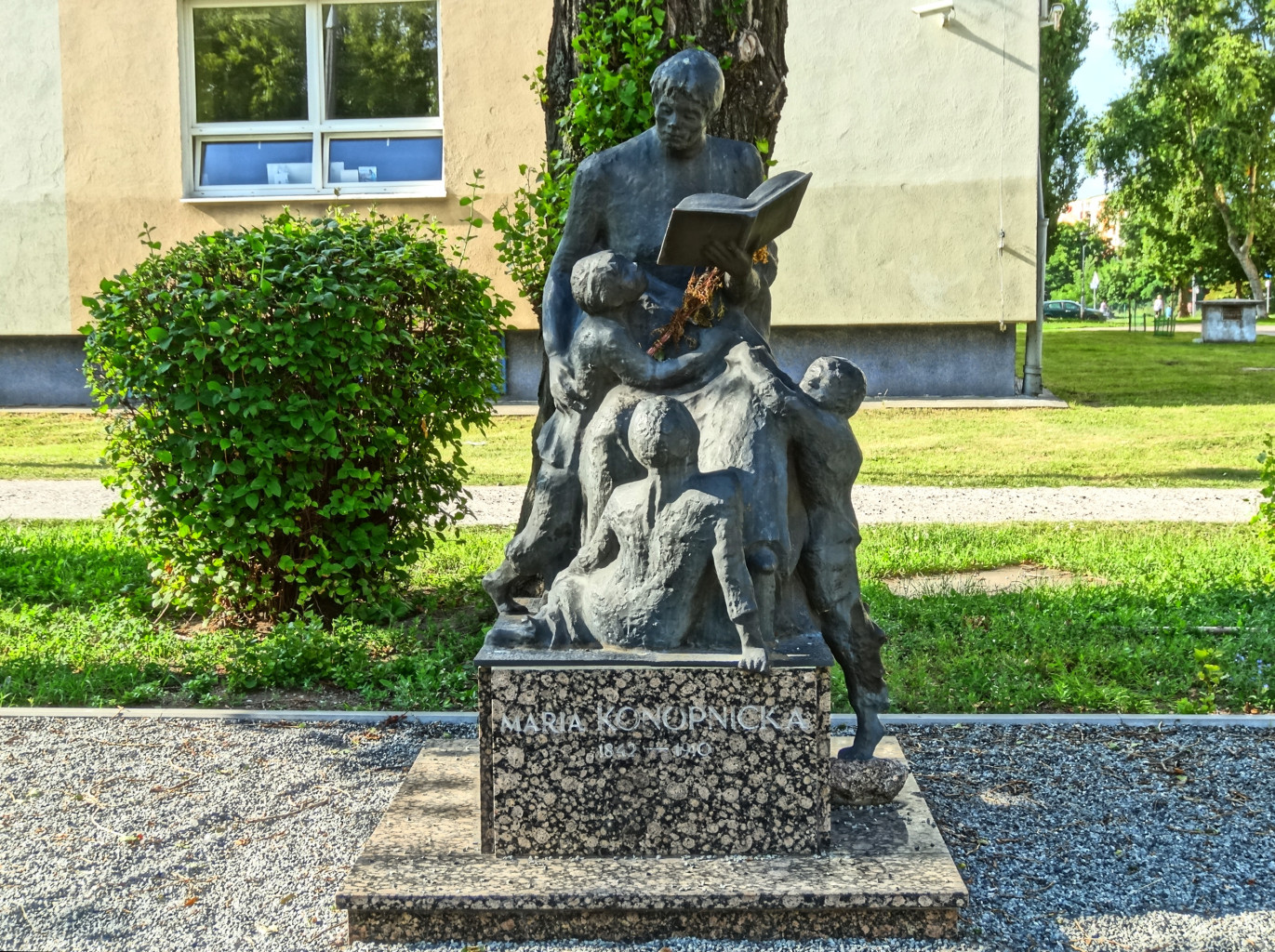
Statue in Bydgoszcz

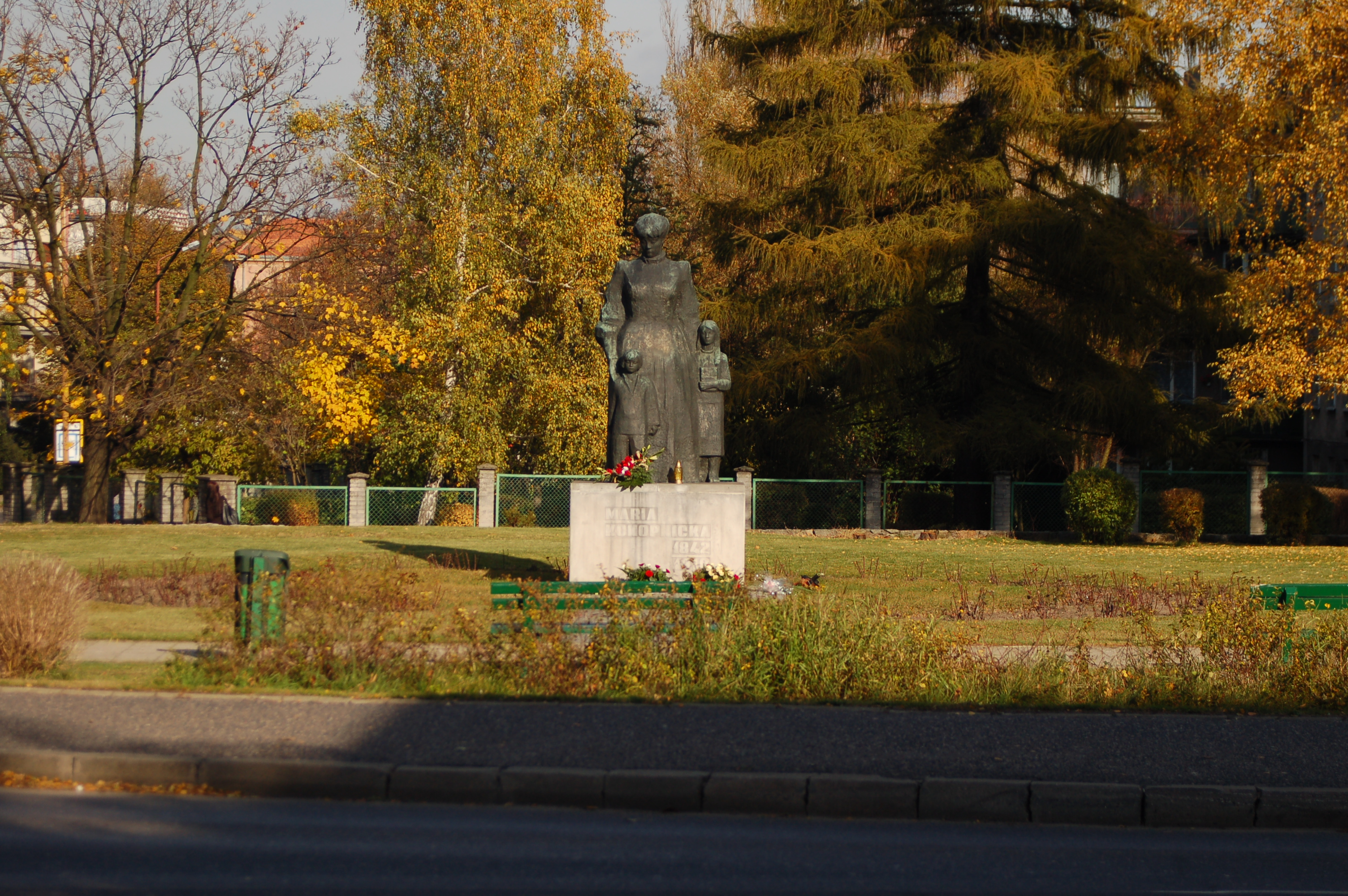
Statue in Kalisz

Statue in Gdańsk

== Selected works ==
=== Poetry ===
- Linie i dźwięki (Lines and Sounds, 1897)
- Śpiewnik historyczny (Historical Music Book, 1904)
- Głosy ciszy (Sounds of Silence, 1906)
- Z liryk i obrazków (Lyrics and Pictures, 1909)
- Pan Balcer w Brazylii (Mister Balcer in Brazil, 1910)

=== Prose ===
- Cztery nowele (Four Short Stories, 1888)
- Moi znajomi (People I Know, 1890)
- Na drodze (On the Way, 1893)
- Ludzie i rzeczy (People and Things, 1898)
- Mendel Gdański

=== Children's ===
- Śpiewnik dla dzieci (Songbook for Children).
- O Janku Wędrowniczku (About Johnnie the Wanderer).
- O krasnoludkach i sierotce Marysi (About the Dwarfs and Little Orphan Mary).
- Na jagody (Picking Blueberries).

=== Poems ===
- Rota (Oath, 1908).
- Stefek Burczymucha.
- Wolny najmita (The Free Day-Labourer).
