= Potok, Podkarpackie Voivodeship =

Potok
- Village
- Location within Poland
- Coordinates: 49°43′14″N 21°40′46″E
- Country: Poland
- Voivodeship: Subcarpathian
- County: Krosno
- Gmina: Jedlicze
- Population (approx.): 1,800

Potok [ˈpɔtɔk] is a village in the administrative district of Gmina Jedlicze, within Krosno County, Subcarpathian Voivodeship, in south-eastern Poland.

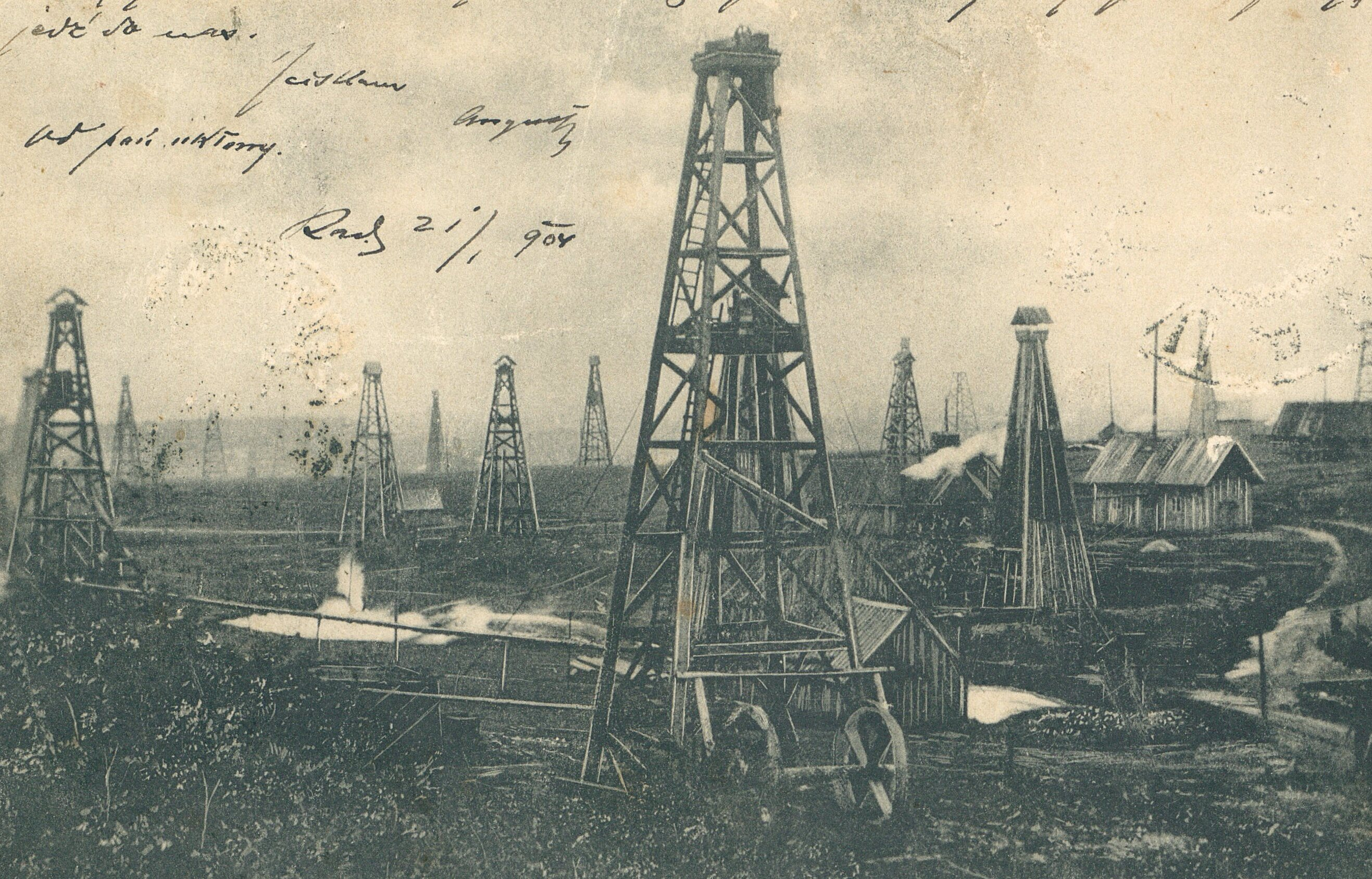
Oil mine in Potok, 1904
