= Jaszczew =

- Village
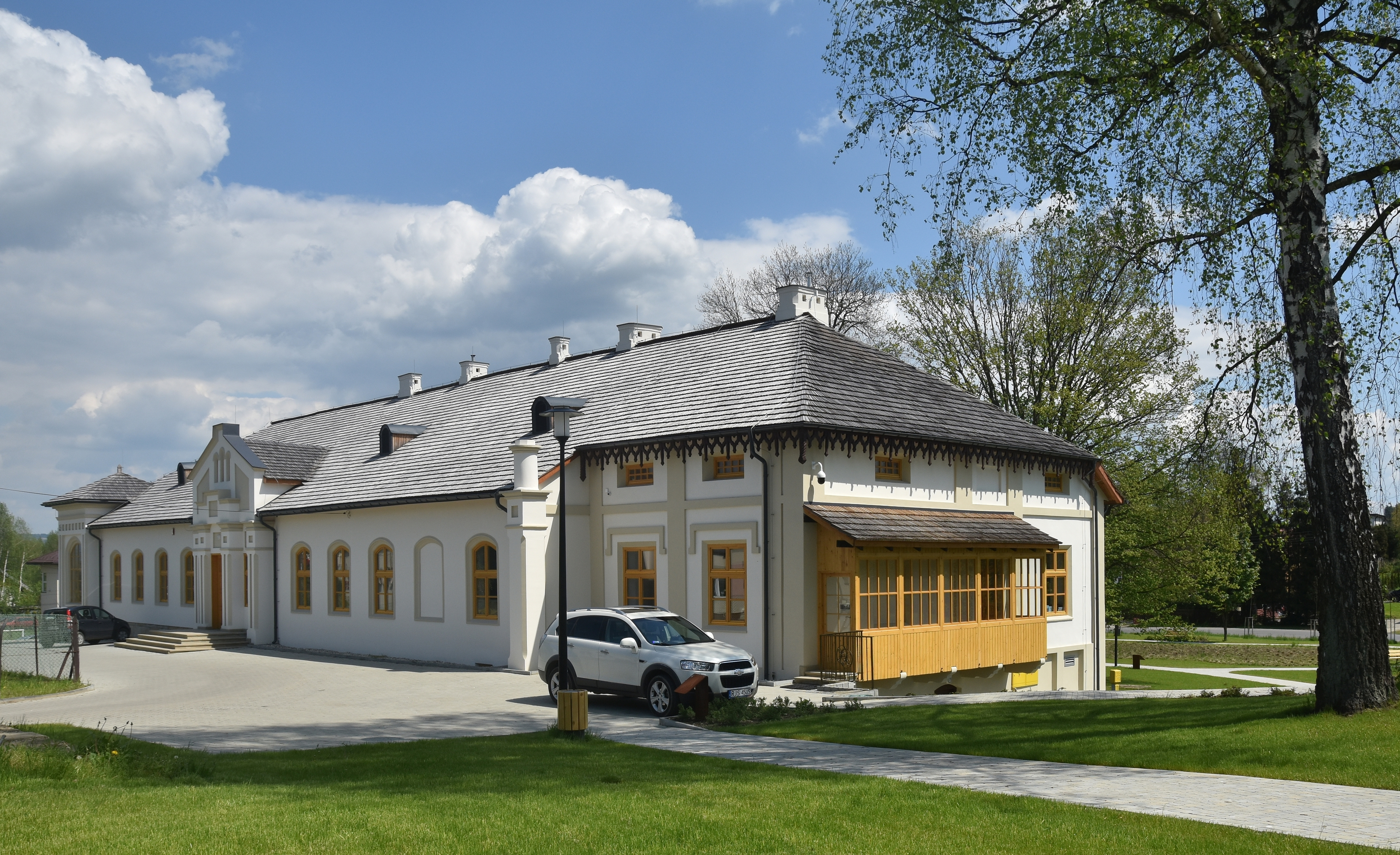
- Stojowski family manor

- Location within Poland
- Coordinates: 49°44′N 21°39′E
- Country: Poland
- Voivodeship: Subcarpathian
- County: Krosno
- Gmina: Jedlicze

Jaszczew [ˈjaʂt͡ʂɛf] is a village in the administrative district of Gmina Jedlicze, within Krosno County, Subcarpathian Voivodeship, in south-eastern Poland.
