= Poręby, Podkarpackie Voivodeship =

Poręby
- Village
- Location within Poland
- Coordinates: 49°41′37″N 21°37′01″E
- Country: Poland
- Voivodeship: Podkarpackie
- County: Krosno
- Gmina: Jedlicze

Poręby [pɔˈrɛmbɨ] is a village in the administrative district of Gmina Jedlicze, within Krosno County, Podkarpackie Voivodeship, in south-eastern Poland.
