= Podniebyle =

- Village
- Location within Poland
- Coordinates: 49°41′N 21°37′E
- Country: Poland
- Voivodeship: Subcarpathian
- County: Krosno
- Gmina: Jedlicze
- Elevation: 385 m (1,263 ft)

Podniebyle [pɔdɲɛˈbɨlɛ] is a village in the administrative district of Gmina Jedlicze, within Krosno County, Subcarpathian Voivodeship, in south-eastern Poland.
