= Chlebna =

- Village
- Location within Poland
- Coordinates: 49°43′N 21°38′E
- Country: Poland
- Voivodeship: Subcarpathian
- County: Krosno
- Gmina: Jedlicze
- Population (approx.): 700

Chlebna [ˈxlɛbna] is a village in the administrative district of Gmina Jedlicze, within Krosno County, Subcarpathian Voivodeship, in south-eastern Poland.

The village borders with Jedlicze and six other villages like Potakówka, Długie, Wrocanka, Żarnowiec, Piotrówka, and Poręby.
