= Polanka Wielka =

- Village
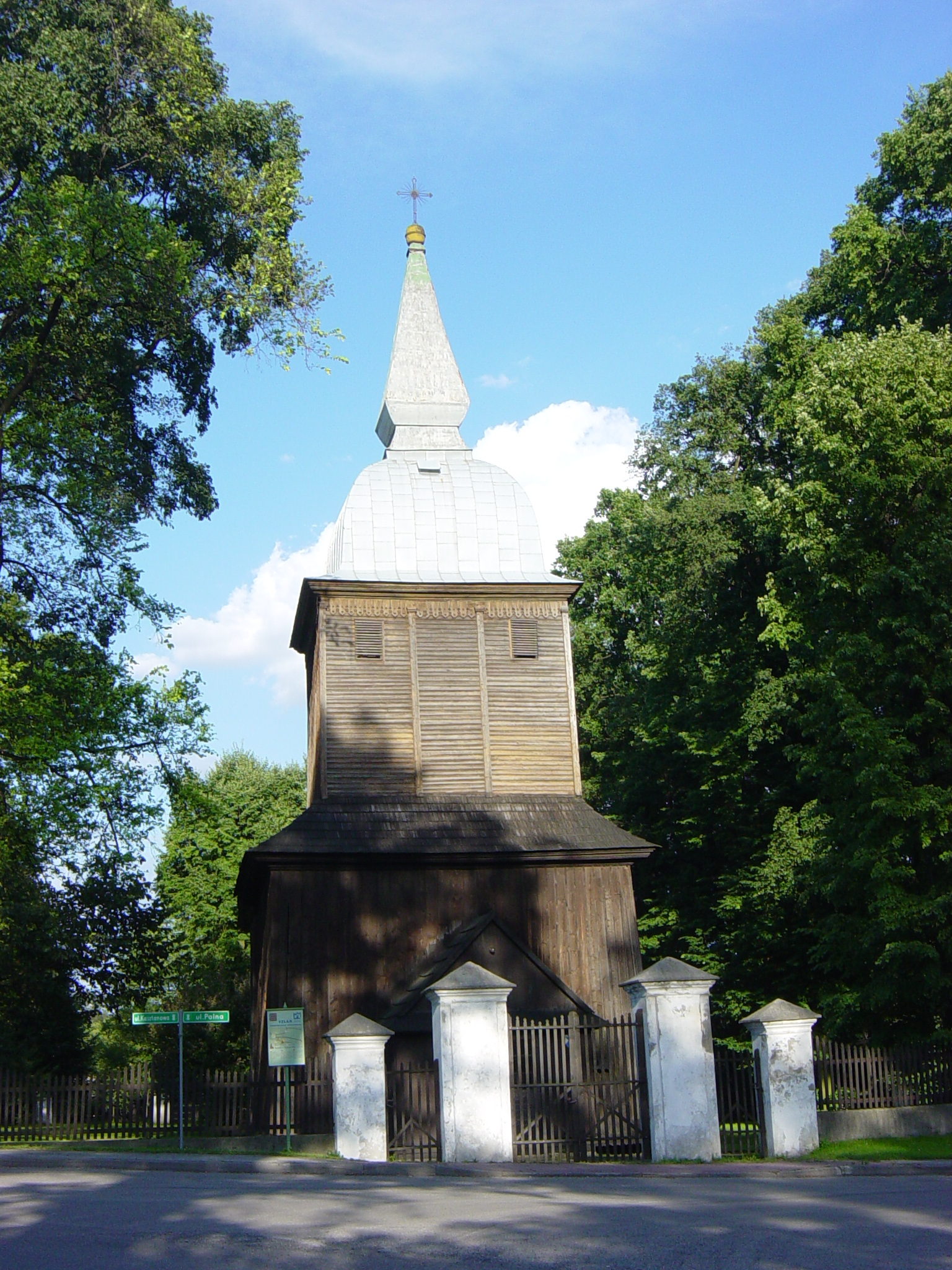
- Saint Nicholas Church

- Location within Poland
- Coordinates: 49°59′N 19°19′E
- Country: Poland
- Voivodeship: Lesser Poland
- County: Oświęcim
- Gmina: Polanka Wielka
- First mentioned: 1326
- Highest elevation: 285 m (935 ft)
- Lowest elevation: 245 m (804 ft)
- Population: 3,800

Polanka Wielka [pɔˈlaŋka ˈvʲɛlka] is a village in Oświęcim County, Lesser Poland Voivodeship, in southern Poland. It is the seat of the gmina (administrative district) called Gmina Polanka Wielka.

== History ==
The village was first mentioned in 1326 in the register of Peter's Pence payment among Catholic parishes of Zator deaconry of the Diocese of Kraków as Polenka. Later in the late 14th century a sister settlement was established, Polanka Górna (lit. Upper Polanka) or Polanka Nowa (New), and the older village was then dubbed Polanka Stara (Old) or Polanka Dolna (Lower).

Politically the villages belonged initially to the Duchy of Oświęcim, formed in 1315 in the process of feudal fragmentation of Poland and was ruled by a local branch of Piast dynasty. In 1327 the duchy became a fee of the Kingdom of Bohemia. In 1457 Jan IV of Oświęcim agreed to sell the duchy to the Polish Crown, and in the accompanying document issued on 21 February the villages were mentioned as Polanka Antiqua and Nowa Polanka.

The territory of the Duchy of Oświęcim was eventually incorporated into Poland in 1564 and formed Silesian County of Kraków Voivodeship. Upon the First Partition of Poland in 1772 it became part of the Austrian Kingdom of Galicia. After World War I and fall of Austria-Hungary it became part of Poland. It was annexed by Nazi Germany at the beginning of World War II, and afterwards it was restored to Poland.
