= Polánka =

- Municipality
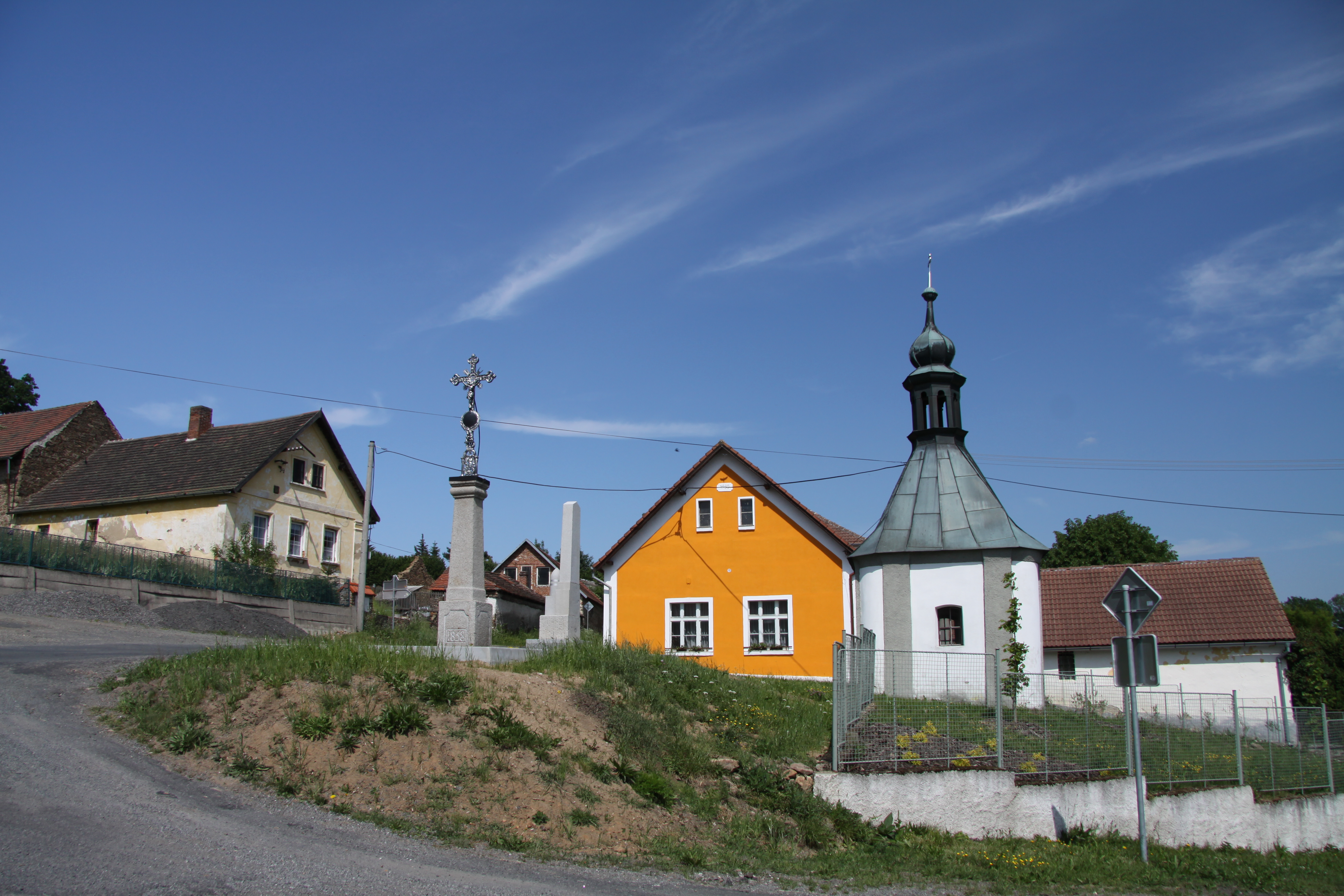
- Chapel in the centre of Polánka

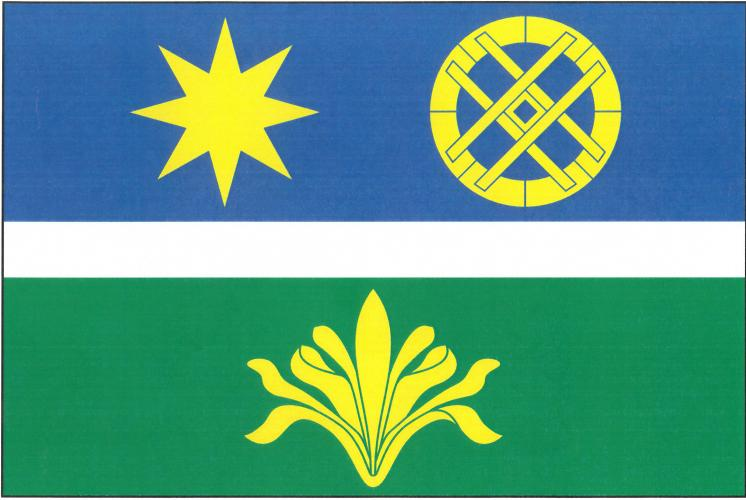
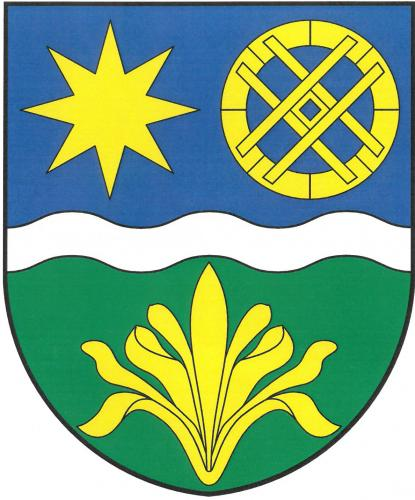
- Flag Coat of arms

- Location in the Czech Republic
- Coordinates: 49°26′9″N 13°33′20″E
- Country: Czech Republic
- Region: Plzeň
- District: Plzeň-South
- First mentioned: 1381

Area
  - Total: 5.12 km^{2} (1.98 sq mi)
- Elevation: 438 m (1,437 ft)

Population (2026-01-01)
  - Total: 50
  - Density: 9.8/km^{2} (25/sq mi)
- Time zone: UTC+1 (CET)
  - Summer (DST): UTC+2 (CEST)
- Postal code: 335 01
- Website: www.polankaunep.cz

Polánka is a municipality and village in Plzeň-South District in the Plzeň Region of the Czech Republic. It has about 50 inhabitants.

Polánka lies approximately 37 kilometres (23 mi) south of Plzeň and 96 km (60 mi) south-west of Prague.

== Demographics ==
Historical population
Year	Pop.	±%
1869	255	—
1880	249	−2.4%
1890	220	−11.6%
1900	210	−4.5%
1910	207	−1.4%
1921	202	−2.4%
1930	173	−14.4%
1950	139	−19.7%
1961	143	+2.9%
1970	117	−18.2%
1980	99	−15.4%
1991	77	−22.2%
2001	55	−28.6%
2011	52	−5.5%
2021	37	−28.8%
Source: Censuses
