= Dobieszyn, Podkarpackie Voivodeship =

Dobieszyn
- Village
- Location within Poland
- Coordinates: 49°41′38″N 21°40′59″E
- Country: Poland
- Voivodeship: Subcarpathian
- County: Krosno
- Gmina: Jedlicze
- Population: 1,400

Dobieszyn [dɔˈbjɛʂɨn] is a village in the administrative district of Gmina Jedlicze, within Krosno County, Subcarpathian Voivodeship, in south-eastern Poland.
