= Żarnowiec, Podkarpackie Voivodeship =

Żarnowiec
- Village
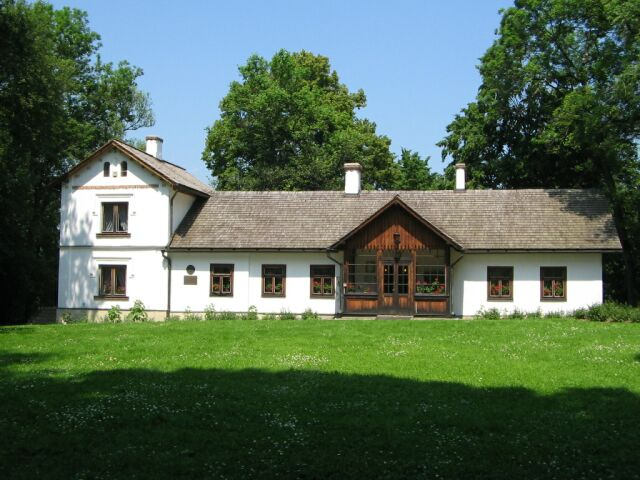
- Maria Konopnicka Museum

- Location within Poland
- Coordinates: 49°41′21″N 21°40′08″E
- Country: Poland
- Voivodeship: Subcarpathian
- County: Krosno
- Gmina: Jedlicze
- Population: 1,100

Żarnowiec [ʐarˈnɔvjɛt͡s] is a village in the administrative district of Gmina Jedlicze, within Krosno County, Subcarpathian Voivodeship, in south-eastern Poland.

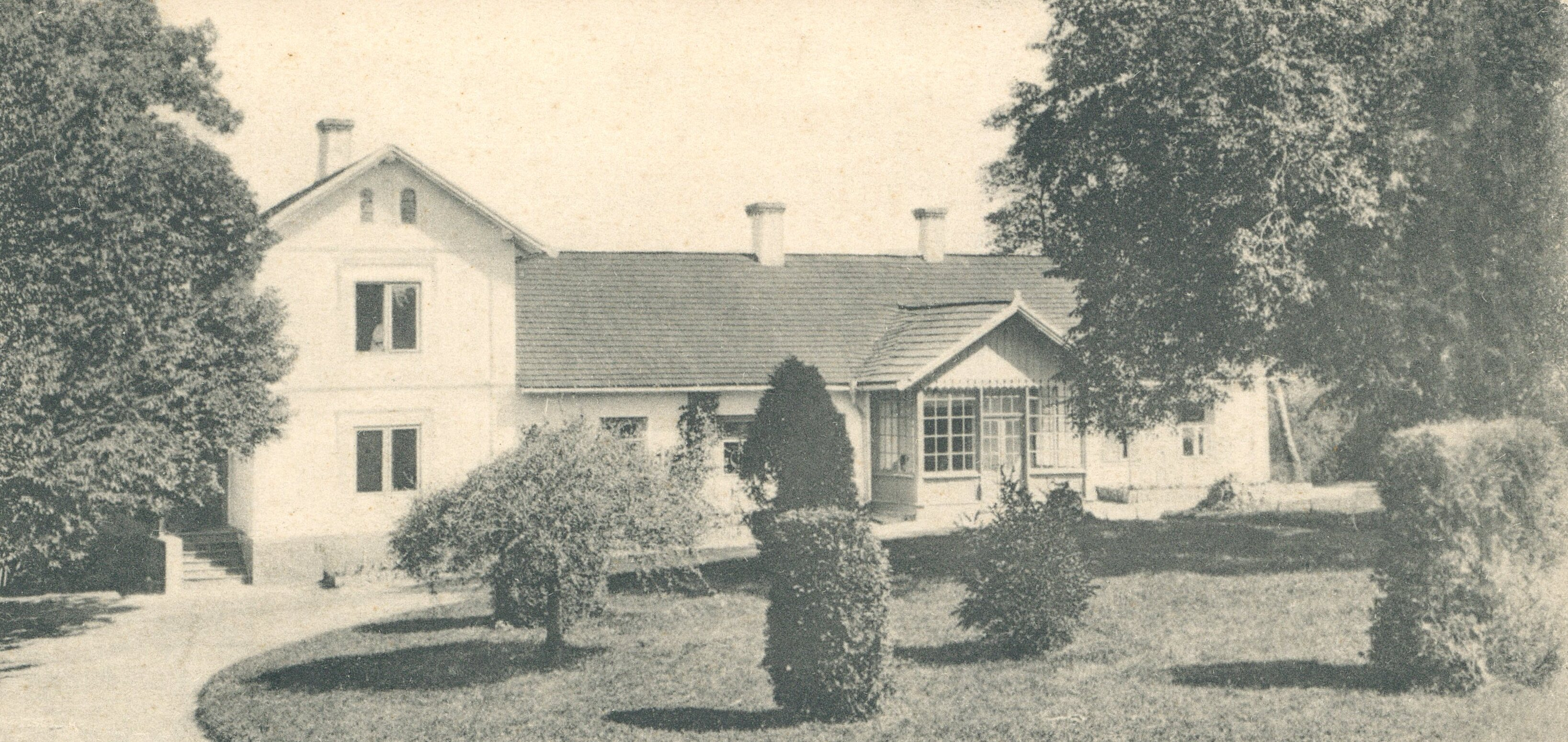
Maria Konopnicka's manor house, before 1904
