= 2021 Rzeszów mayoral election =

Local election in Poland

2021 Rzeszów Presidential Election
- 13 June 2021
- Turnout: 54.03%
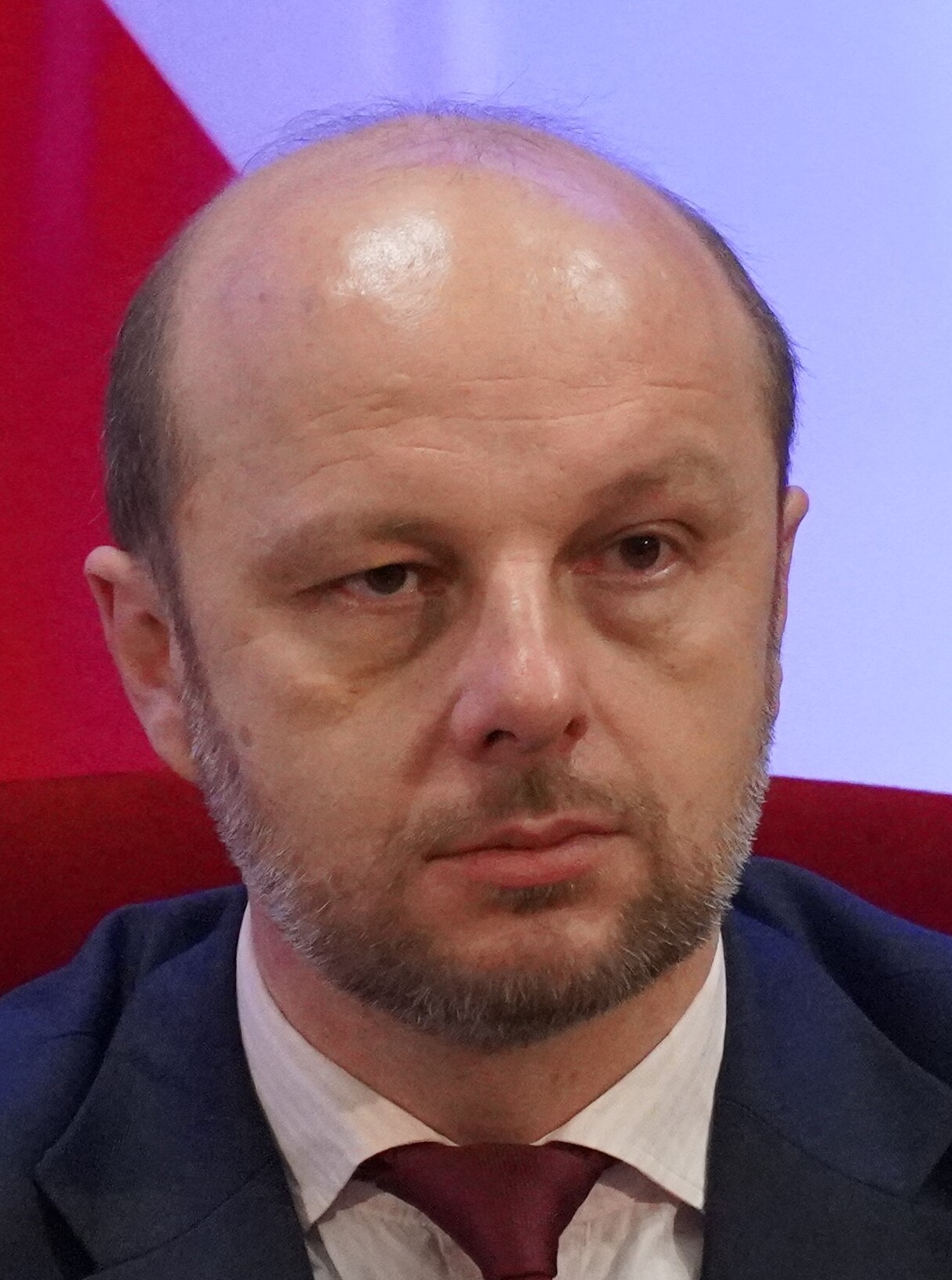

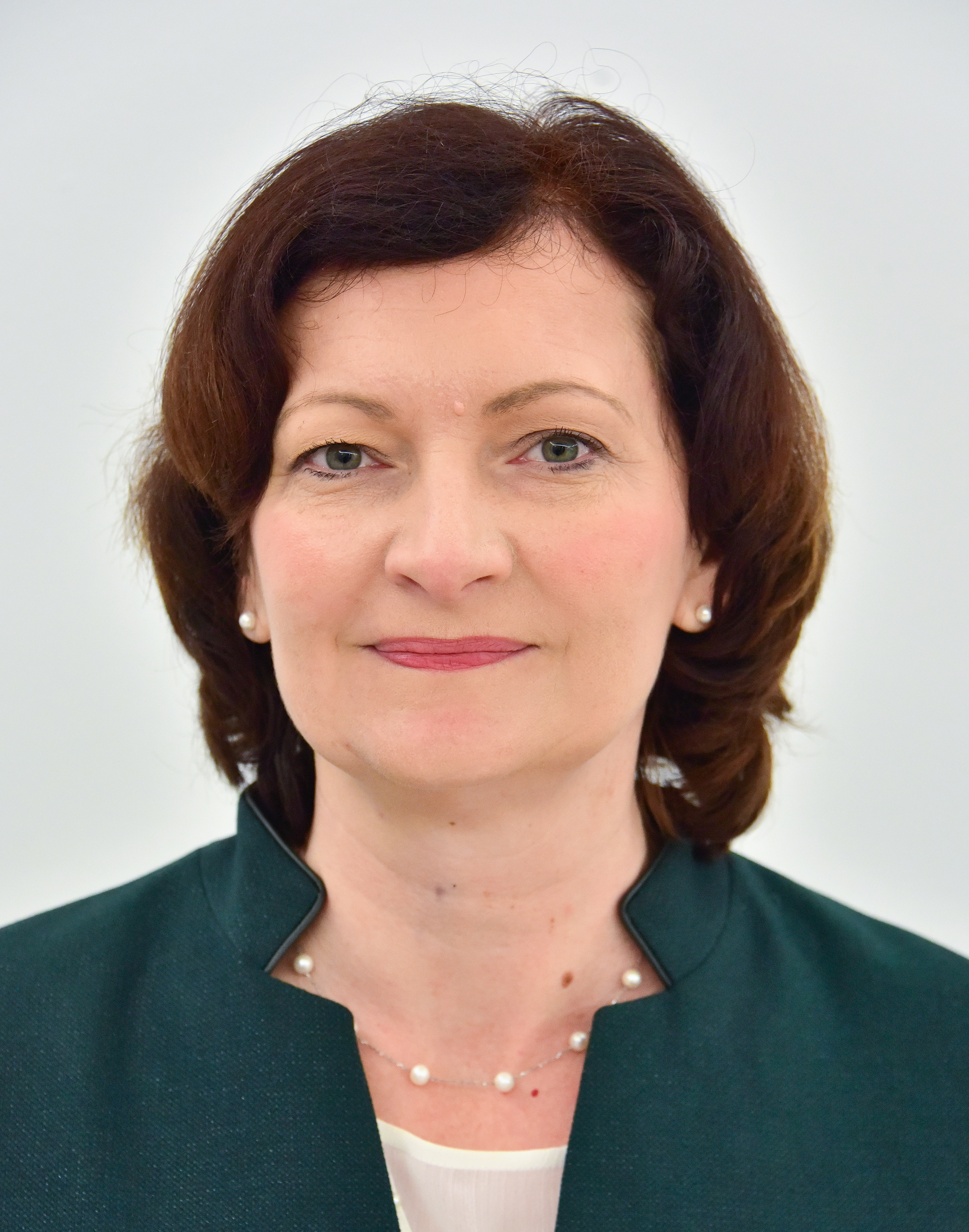

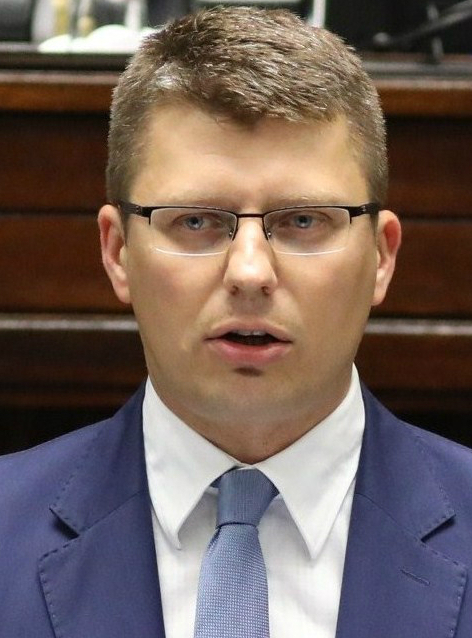

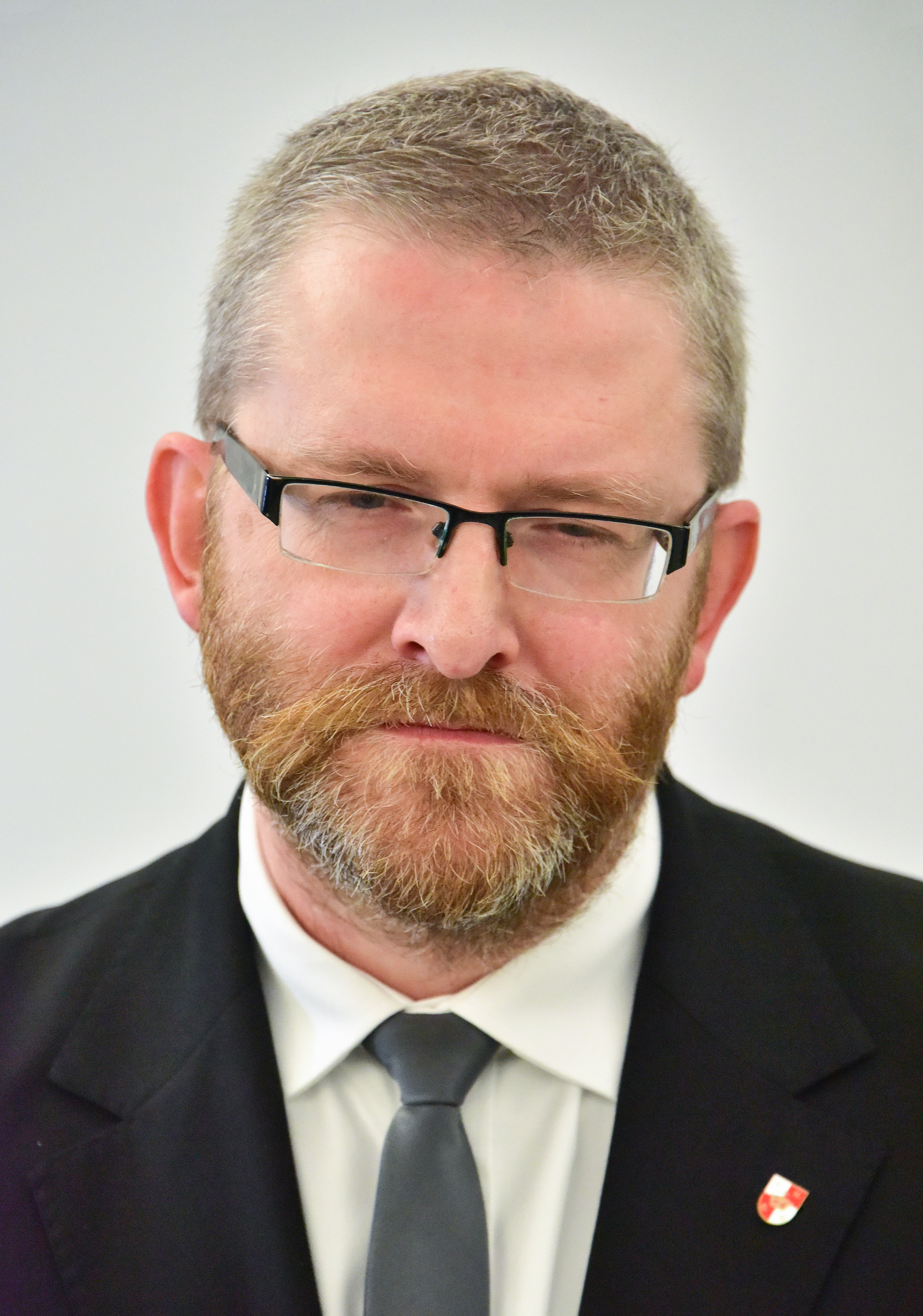
Candidate	Konrad Fijołek	Ewa Leniart	Marcin Warchoł
Party	Rozwój Rzeszowa 2.0 (supported by KO, PL2050, PSL, Lewica)	Wspólny Dom Rzeszów (supported by PiS)	Dla Rzeszowa (supported by SP, PJG, K15, Tadeusz Ferenc)
Percentage	56.51%	23.62%	10.72%
Popular Vote	45,059	18,831	8,546
Candidate	Grzegorz Braun
Party	Confederation
Percentage	9.15%
Popular Vote	7,296
President before election
Marek Bajdak
PiS
Elected President
Konrad Fijołek
Rozwój Rzeszowa 2.0

The 2021 Rzeszów Presidential Elections – were announced after the incumbent President Tadeusz Ferenc resigned, which happened on 10 February 2021. The election commissioner in Rzeszów, through a decision on 17 February 2021, declared the mandate of the city's president to expire.

On 14 March 2021, the Polish Prime Minister, Mateusz Morawiecki, ordered that the election take place on 9 May. The Election date has been moved to 13 June 2021.

== Electoral committees ==
According to the election calendar, until 30 March 2021, the election commissioner will receive notices about the establishment of electoral committees intending to nominate candidates for the mayor of the city.

The following committees have been registered:

- KWW Ewy Leniart Wspólny Dom Rzeszów
  KWW Ewa Leniart Shared Home Rzeszów
- KWW Grzegorz Braun – Konfederacja
- KWW Konrada Fijołka „Rozwój Rzeszowa 2.0”
  Konrad Fijołek's KWW "Development of Rzeszów 2.0"
- KWW Rzeszów Przyszłości
  KWW Rzeszów of the Future
- KW Marcin Warchoł Tadeusz Ferenc – Dla Rzeszowa
  KW Marcin Warchoł Tadeusz Ferenc - For Rzeszów
- KWW Waldemar Kotula – Porozumienie dla Rzeszowa
  KWW Waldemar Kotula - Agreement for Rzeszów
- KW Polska 2050
  KW Poland 2050
- KW Hejt Stop
  KW Stop Hate
- KWW Kazimierza Rocheckiego „Z-C-Z Rzeszów”
- KWW Trybuna Miasta Rzeszowa
  KWW Tribune of the City of Rzeszów
- KWW Artura Głowackiego
- KW Normalny Kraj
  KW Normal Country
- KWW Dobry Wybór dla Rzeszowa
  KWW Good Choice for Rzeszów

== Candidates ==
According to the election calendar, until 16 April 2021, the city election commission will be accepting applications for the President of the city. Each committee will be able to register one candidate.

On the day of Tadeusz Ferenc's resignation, Marcin Warchoł, Deputy Minister of Justice from United Poland, announced his run in the elections, who received the support of the outgoing president.

On 22 February 2021, the local branches of the Polish People's Party announced the run of the president of one of the Rzeszów housing cooperatives, Edward Słupek.

On 23 February 2021, Jarosław Gowin's Agreement announced that they would run for the elections. The party's candidate was city councilor Waldemar Kotula, who won in the party primaries in March 2021 with the second candidate, vice-president of the Polish Tourist Organization, Arkadiusz Opoń.

On 4 March 2021, Confederation announced that its candidate would be MP Grzegorz Braun, who in 2019 ran unsuccessfully in the early elections for the president of Gdańsk.

On 10 March 2021, Law and Justice recommended the candidacy of Ewa Leniart, the voivode of the Subcarpathian Voivodeship

On 15 March 2021, Konrad Fijołek, the deputy chairman of the City Council in Rzeszów and the head of the Rzeszów development club, officially presented his candidacy in the elections. He will run from his own election committee, with the support of the Civic Coalition, the Polish People's Party, the Left and Poland 2050

Waldemar Kotula dropped out from the election and endorsed Marcin Warchoł, United Poland's candidate and Ferenc's picked successor.

== Result ==
The election was won in the first round by the United opposition candidate Konrad Fijołek, a former councillor from Tadeusz Ferenc’s Electoral Committee. In second place came Ewa Leniart, the Law and Justice candidate and Voivode of the Subcarpathian Voivodship.

Candidate	Party	Votes	%
Konrad Fijołek	Independent (with KO, PL2050, The Left, PSL support)	45,059	56.51
Ewa Leniart	Law and Justice	18,831	23.62
Marcin Warchoł	Independent (with SP, P, K15 support)	8,546	10.72
Grzegorz Braun	Confederation	7,296	9.15
Total		79,732	100.00
