= Sovereign Poland =

Political party in Poland

Sovereign Poland Suwerenna Polska
- Leader: Zbigniew Ziobro
- Secretary-General: Andrzej Dera
- Founded: 24 March 2012
- Dissolved: 12 October 2024
- Split from: Law and Justice
- Merged into: Law and Justice
- Youth wing: The New Generation (Polish: Nowe Pokolenie)
- Ideology: Christian right; National conservatism; Social conservatism; Euroscepticism
- Political position: Right-wing to far-right Factions: Centre-right
- Religion: Roman Catholicism
- National affiliation: United Right
- European affiliation: Movement for a Europe of Liberties and Democracy (2012-2015)
- European Parliament group: EFD (2012–2014); ECR Group (2019-2024)
- Colours: Blue (until 2023); Red

Website
- suwerennapolska.pl

Sovereign Poland (Polish: Suwerenna Polska, SP), also known as United Poland (Polish: Solidarna Polska; alternatively translated to Solidarity Poland), until 2023, was a Catholic-nationalist political party in Poland led by Zbigniew Ziobro. It was founded in 2012, as the Catholic-nationalist split from the Law and Justice, with whom they later formed the United Right alliance in 2014. Sovereign Poland merged with Law and Justice on 12 October 2024.

== Ideology ==
The party has been described as national-conservative, nationalist, and Catholic-nationalist. It was also staunchly socially conservative. It was opposed to abortion and euthanasia, and supported extending maternity leave to nine months. It was eurosceptic, anti-LGBT, and its staunch opposition to same-sex marriage was cited as a main reason it left the ECR group in the European Parliament in 2012. It has also been described as right-wing populist mainly due to their opposition to immigration. It was the most anti-EU party in the United Right coalition. Between 2012 and 2021 it was described as right-wing and far-right, with a centre-right faction.

In its 2013 program, United Poland called for the government intervention in the economy, especially tax policy. The party has called for a 'fat cat' tax on big companies, including supermarkets, and backs higher taxes on those who earn over 10,000 złotych (€2,400) a month.

During the tenure of then-United Poland leader Zbigniew Ziobro as Minister of Justice, Ziobro was the architect of judicial reforms to the Constitutional Tribunal, which resulted in the Polish Constitutional Tribunal crisis. Law and Justice Prime Minister Mateusz Morawiecki has blamed United Poland for failures associated with these reforms, while Ziobro has criticised Law and Justice and President Andrzej Duda for blocking elements of the reform package.

In 2022, United Poland called for tougher blasphemy laws in Poland, such as three-year jail terms for insulting church or interrupting Mass.

== History ==
After Ziobro and fellow MEPs Tadeusz Cymański and Jacek Kurski were ejected from PiS for disloyalty on 4 November 2011, Ziobro's supporters within PiS formed a new group in the Sejm. Despite claims that the new group was not attempting to form a new party, the MPs were expelled from Law and Justice. The party was founded in 2012 by Law and Justice (PiS) MEP Zbigniew Ziobro, who led the party's conservative Catholic-nationalist faction.

In 2012, their MEPs left the European Conservatives and Reformists (ECR) to join the Europe of Freedom and Democracy (EFD) group in opposition to the ECR's more liberal stance on gay marriage, its support for the EU's climate change policy, and its advocacy of cuts to the Common Agricultural Policy.

The party was officially launched on 24 March 2012. At the time, opinion polls put the party just around 2%. In a 2020 poll, it found that if the party ran independent from the United Right it would gain 5.4% votes.

Sovereign Poland merged with Law and Justice on 12 October 2024 during PiS congress in Przysucha, despite concerns from some high-ranking members of both parties.

== Representatives ==
=== Leadership ===
Leader:

- Zbigniew Ziobro

Vice-Leaders:

- Beata Kempa
- Michał Woś
- Michał Wójcik

Secretary:

- Piotr Cieplucha

Chairman of the General Council:

- Edward Siarka

=== Members of the Sejm ===
- Mariusz Kałużny (5 - Toruń)
- Jan Kanthak (6 - Lublin)
- Marcin Romanowski (7 - Chełm)
- Tadeusz Woźniak (11 – Sieradz)
- Edward Siarka (14 - Nowy Sącz)
- Norbert Kaczmarczyk (15 - Tarnów)
- Jacek Ozdoba (16 - Płock)
- Sebastian Kaleta (19 - Warsaw I)
- Janusz Kowalski (21 - Opole)
- Maria Kurowska (22 - Krosno)
- Piotr Uruski (22 - Krosno)
- Marcin Warchoł (23 - Rzeszów)
- Zbigniew Ziobro (23 - Rzeszów)
- Sebastian Łukaszewicz (24 - Białystok)
- Michał Woś (30 - Bielsko-Biała II)
- Michał Wójcik (31 - Katowice II)
- Mariusz Gosek (33 - Kielce)
- Dariusz Matecki (41 - Szczecin)

=== Member of the Senate ===
- Mieczysław Golba (Senate Constituency no. 58)

=== Members of the European Parliament ===
- Patryk Jaki (Lesser Poland and Świętokrzyskie)
- Jacek Ozdoba (Masovian)

== Election results ==
=== Presidential ===
Election	Candidate	1st round		2nd round	
Election	Candidate	# of overall votes	% of overall vote	# of overall votes	% of overall vote
2015	Supported Andrzej Duda	5,179,092	34.8 (#1)	8,719,281	51.5 (#1)
2020	Supported Andrzej Duda	8,450,513	43.50 (#1)	10,440,648	51.03% (#1)

=== Sejm ===
Election	Leader	Votes	%	Seats	+/–	Government
2015	Zbigniew Ziobro	5,711,687 (Note: Received 277,622 votes)	37.6 (Note: Got 1.83%) (#1)	8 / 460	New	PiS
2015	As part of the United Right coalition, that won 235 seats in total.					
2019	Zbigniew Ziobro	8,051,935 (Note: 331,467)	43.6 (#1)	10 / 460	▲2	PiS
2019	As part of the United Right coalition, that won 235 seats in total.					
2023	Zbigniew Ziobro	7,640,854 (Note: 465,024)	35.4 (#1)	18 / 460	▲8	KO–PL2050–KP–NL
2023	As part of the United Right coalition, that won 194 seats in total.					

=== Senate ===
Election	Seats	+/–
2015	2 / 100	New
2015	As part of the United Right coalition, that won 61 seats in total.	
2019	2 / 100	0
2019	As part of the United Right coalition, that won 48 seats in total.	
2023	1 / 100	▼1
2023	As part of the United Right coalition, that won 34 seats in total.	

=== European Parliament ===
Election	Votes	Leader	%	Seats	+/–	EP Group
2014	Zbigniew Ziobro	281,079	4.20 (#6)	0 / 51	New	–
2019	Zbigniew Ziobro	6,192,780 (Note: 289,536)	45.38 (#1)	1 / 52	▲1	ECR
2019	As part of the United Right coalition, that won 27 seats in total.					
2024	Zbigniew Ziobro	4,253,169 (Note: 575,261)	36.16 (#2)	2 / 53	▲1	ECR
2024	As part of the United Right coalition, that won 20 seats in total.					
