= Nikifor =

Lemko painter (1895–1968)

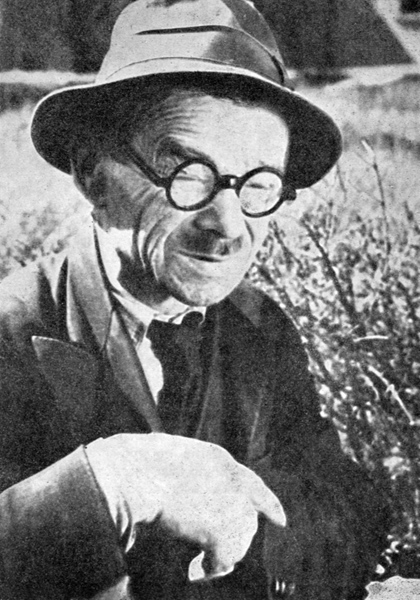
- Nikifor in 1966
- Born: 1895
- Died: 1968 (aged 72–73)
- Occupation: painter

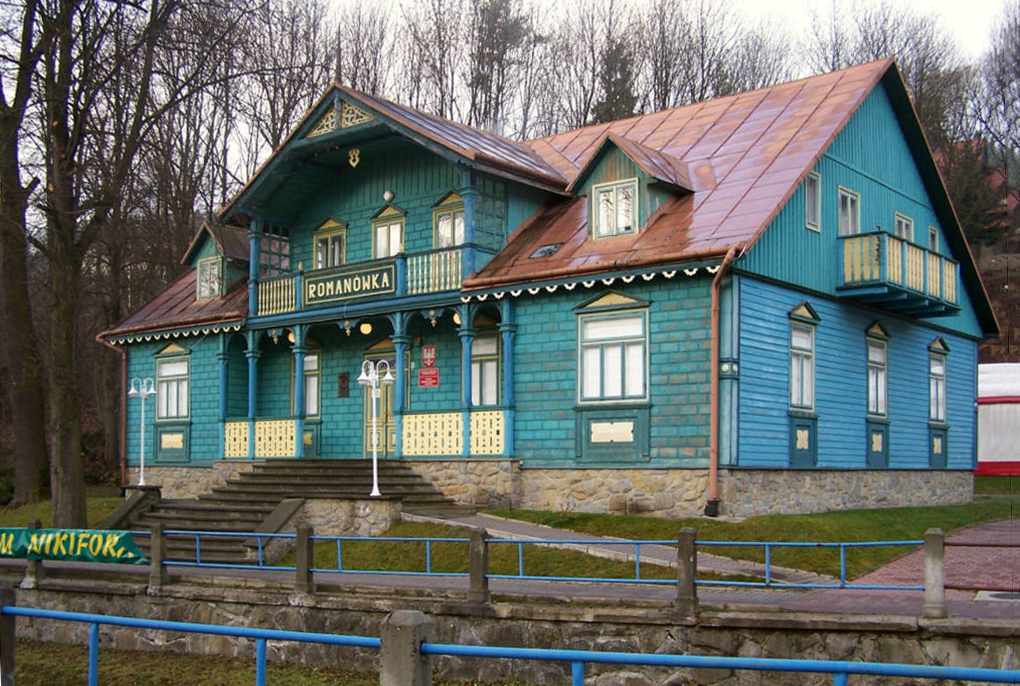
Nikifor's Museum in Krynica

Nikifor (21 May 1895, Krynica, Austria-Hungary – 10 October 1968, Folusz, Poland), also known as Nikifor Krynicki, born as Epifaniy Drovnyak (Epifaniusz Drowniak)^{1}, was a Lemko naïve painter. Nikifor painted over 40,000 pictures – on sheets of paper, pages of notebooks, cigarette cartons, and even on scraps of paper glued together. The topics of his art include self-portraits and panoramas of Krynica, with its spas and Orthodox and Catholic churches. Underestimated for most of his life, in his late days he became famous as a naïve painter.

== Biography ==
Little is known of Nikifor's private life. For most of his life, he lived alone in extreme poverty in Krynica, and was considered mentally challenged. He had difficulties speaking and was almost illiterate. It was not until his later years that it was discovered his tongue was in fact attached to his palate, causing his speech to be unintelligible to most people. In 1930, his first paintings were discovered by Ukrainian painter Roman Turyn, who brought them to Paris. That gained Nikifor some fame among the Kapists, a group of young painters formed around Józef Pankiewicz. This did not, however, change his fate, as his art was still underestimated in Poland. In 1938 Jerzy Wolff did publish an enthusiastic review of Nikifor's art in the (Polish) editing house Wydawnictwo ''Arkady'' monthly, and purchased some of his works. However, the advent of World War II prevented Nikifor from gaining much popular notoriety.

In 1947 Nikifor was deported during Operation Vistula, where the Lemko and Ukrainian minorities were forcibly resettled by the communist regime to northern and western Poland, away from their ancestral homelands in the southeast. Three times he attempted to return and authorities allowed him to stay the third time.

In 1960 Nikifor met Marian Włosiński, a painter living in Krynica. The latter decided to devote his career and life to helping the elderly artist and promoted his works in the major galleries of Poland. This led to a large and successful exhibition in Warsaw at the Zachęta Art Gallery. On 10 October 1968, Nikifor died in a public nursing home in the village of Folusz. He was buried at the Old Cemetery in Krynica. After his death, most of his works were preserved by Włosiński and donated to various museums. The most complete collection is stored in the Regional Museum of Nowy Sącz and the Krynica-based museum of Nikifor. His work is also represented in the Collection de l'Art Brut in Lausanne, Ukrainian Museum in New York City and the Zander Collection in Cologne.

In his early years, Nikifor received care at a local hospital in Krynica, for which he often paid with his paintings. Because he mixed his pigments with saliva and the hospital suspected he had tuberculosis, many of his paintings were destroyed.

== Exhibitions ==
in 2023, the Ukrainian Museum in NYC exhibited 135 works from its permanent collection in an exhibition curated by Myrolsalva Mudrak, professor emerita of Art History from Ohio State University. The exhibition was accompanied by a catalogue published by Rodovid publishing in Kyiv. Nikifor's art explored themes such as self-portraits and panoramic views of Krynica, and its Orthodox and Catholic churches. His extensive collection of drawings blends classic landscapes with personal memories. Each piece presents a kaleidoscope of both the familiar and the unknown. His meticulous renderings vary from packed compositions, where every inch of the paper is covered with pencil strokes, to more spacious works which invite the viewer to ponder what might be absent.

== Name ==
The name and surname of Nikifor have been a matter of dispute for over half a century, as he had no known relatives or documents, and was almost illiterate. He signed his works with the names Nikifor, Netyfor or Matejko. In 1962 the communist authorities in Poland arbitrarily chose the name Nikifor Krynicki (Nikifor of Krynica, after his place of residence) so that a passport could be issued for him. This act was declared null by a court in 2003, following a statement by the Lemko Association of Poland. The court identified documents which stated that Nikifor was baptized Epifaniy Drovnyak (Epifaniusz Drowniak in Polish) and his mother was Eudokia Drowniak, a Lemko woman. Following the court ruling, the name on his grave in Krynica's cemetery was altered. His tombstone now bears two names: "Epifaniy Drovnyak" in the Cyrillic alphabet and "Nikifor Krynicki" in the Latin alphabet.

== In popular culture ==
Nikifor's last years were the topic of the 2004 film My Nikifor by Krzysztof Krauze, featuring actress Krystyna Feldman in the role of the artist.

In 1968, Polish folk-rock group No To Co released an album titled "Nikifor" featuring a tribute song to the artist by the same name. The album also featured one of his paintings as the cover art.
