= Teresa Kubas-Hul =

Polish politician

Teresa Krystyna Kubas-Hul
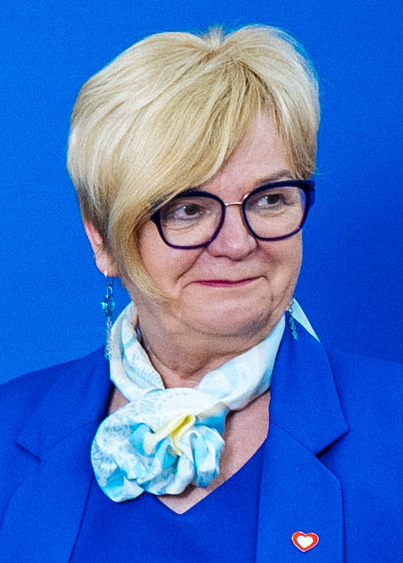
- Kubas-Hul in 2024

Voivode of Subcarpathian Voivodeship
- Incumbent
- Assumed office 20 December 2023
- President: Andrzej Duda; Karol Nawrocki
- Prime Minister: Donald Tusk
- Preceded by: Ewa Leniart

Personal details
- Born: 9 July 1963 (age 63) Styków, Polish People's Republic
- Citizenship: Poland
- Party: Civic Platform
- Education: Rzeszów Branch of Maria Curie-Skłodowska University
- Occupation: Politician
- Awards: Cross of Merit

Teresa Krystyna Kubas-Hul (born July 9, 1963 in Styków) is a Polish politician, economist, and local government official. She chaired the Subcarpathian Voivodeship Sejmik from 2010 to 2013 and has served as Voivode of the Subcarpathian Voivodeship since December 2023.

== Biography ==
She graduated with a degree in economics from the Rzeszów branch of Maria Curie-Skłodowska University in Lublin. She was employed at a housing cooperative in Rzeszów and, from 1995 to 2008, at the Rzeszów Regional Development Agency (including as the board's representative for cooperation with local governments and the director of cooperation and innovation). From 2000 to 2002, she also served as deputy director of the Subcarpathian branch of the Agency for Restructuring and Modernization of Agriculture. She was a member of the provincial board of the Polish Social Welfare Committee and the board of the Foundation for Assistance Programs for Agriculture. She manages European Union aid programs and, in 2008, served as an advisor to the Subcarpathian Voivode on EU funds.

In the 2006 elections, she was elected as a councilor to the Subcarpathian Voivodeship Sejmik from the Civic Platform party and became vice-chair of the third-term assembly. In 2010, she was re-elected as a councilor and subsequently assumed the position of chair of the fourth-term assembly, a position she held until 2013. That same year, she became vice-president of the board of the Polish Agency for Enterprise Development. She also became a lecturer at the Rzeszów-Przemyśl School of Law and Administration (renamed the Rzeszów University of Law and Administration), and later served as the university's rector's representative for external funding.

In 2014, she successfully ran for re-election in the subsequent regional assembly elections. She became chair of the Civic Platform caucus. She did not run for re-election in 2018. She ran unsuccessfully for the Sejm in 2007, 2011, 2015, and 2019.

On December 20, 2023, she was appointed Voivode of the Subcarpathian Voivodeship. In 2024, she unsuccessfully ran for the European Parliament election on behalf of the Civic Coalition from district no. 9.

== Awards and honours ==
In 2010, she was awarded the Silver Cross of Merit.
