= Marcin Warchoł =

Polish politician (born 1980)

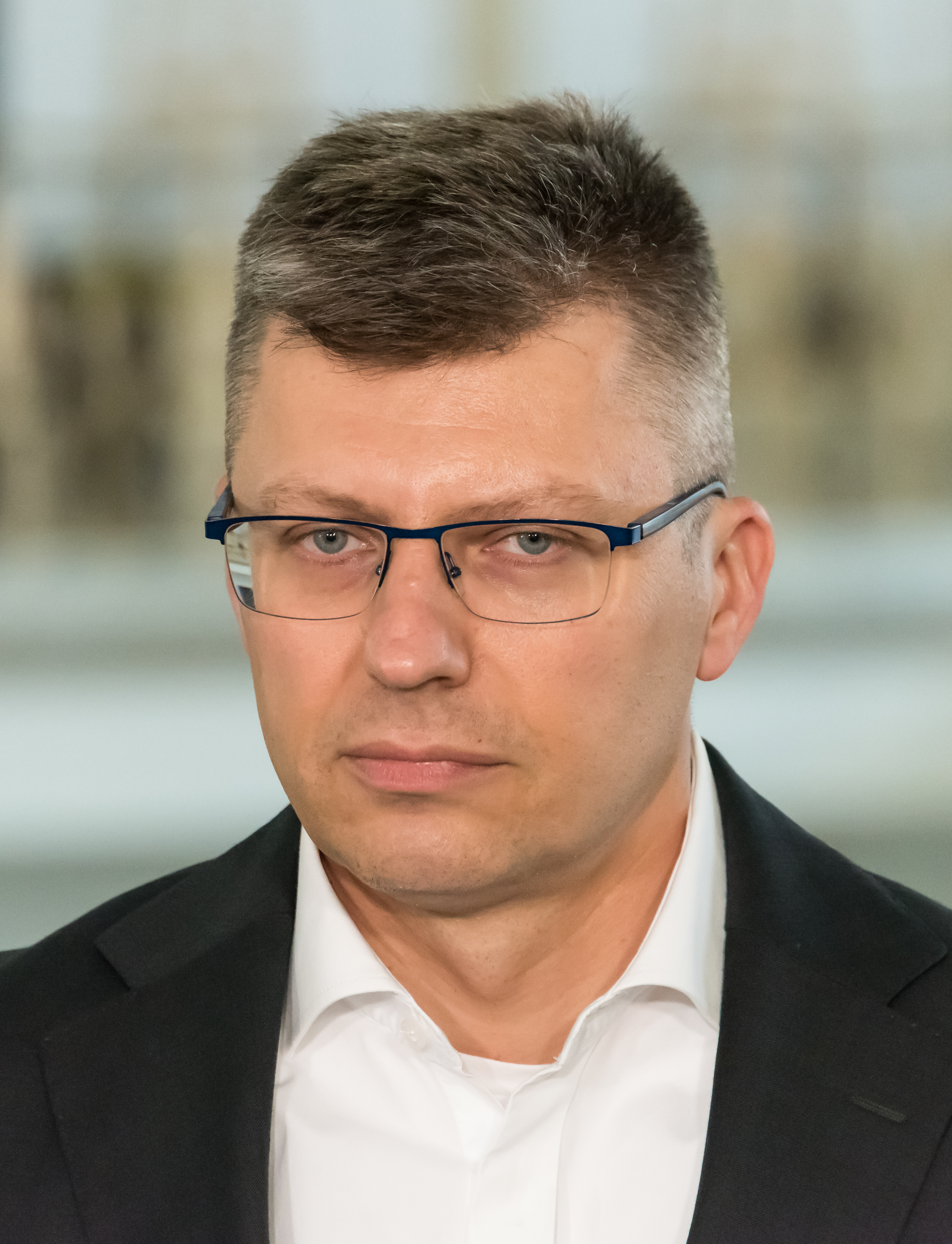
- Warchoł in 2023

Minister of Justice
- In office 27 November 2023 – 13 December 2023
- Prime Minister: Mateusz Morawiecki
- Preceded by: Zbigniew Ziobro
- Succeeded by: Adam Bodnar

Member of the Sejm
- Incumbent
- Assumed office 13 November 2019
- Constituency: Rzeszów

Personal details
- Born: 13 July 1980 (age 46) Nisko, Poland
- Party: Sovereign Poland

Marcin Józef Warchoł (born 13 July 1980) is a Polish politician of Sovereign Poland serving as a member of the Sejm. He was first elected in the 2019 parliamentary election, and was re-elected in 2023. He previously served as minister of justice in 2023. He was a candidate in the 2021 Rzeszów mayoral election, with the support of Sovereign Poland, Agreement, Kukiz'15 and former mayor Tadeusz Ferenc.
