= Leszek Deptuła =

Polish veterinarian and politician (1953-2010)

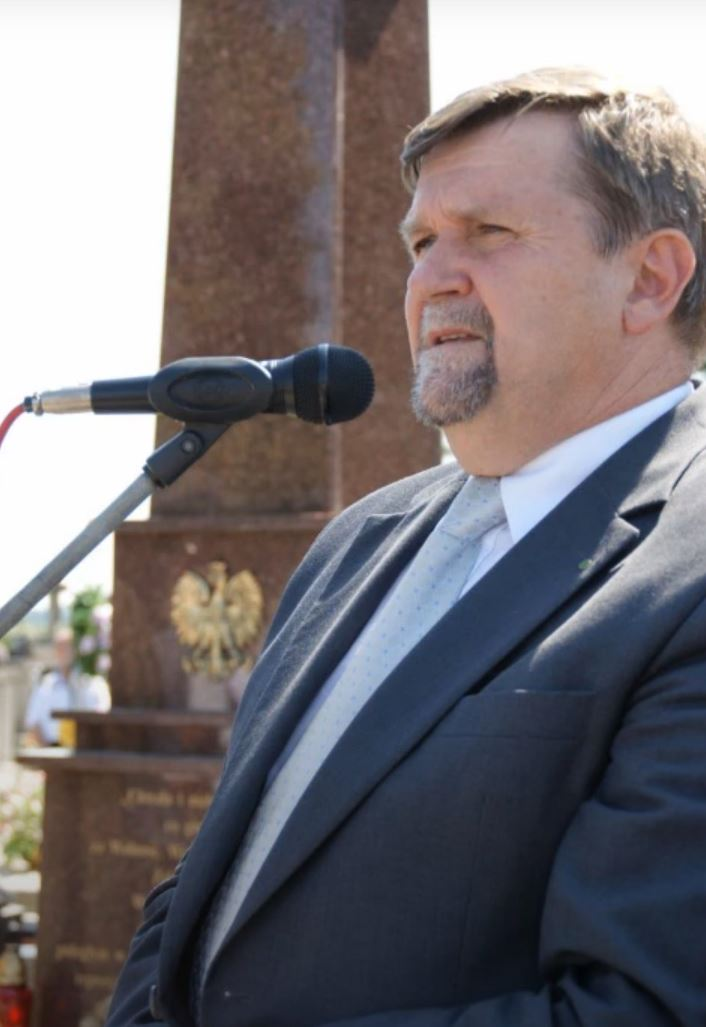
- Deptuła in 2009

Deputy of the VI Sejm
- In office 2007 – 2010
- Succeeded by: Wiesław Rygiel
- Constituency: 23 Rzeszów

Marshal of Subcarpathian Voivodeship
- In office 2002 – 2006
- Preceded by: Bogdan Rzońca
- Succeeded by: Zygmunt Cholewiński

Personal details
- Born: 25 February 1953 Żagań, Polish People's Republic
- Died: 10 April 2010 (aged 57) near Smolensk, Russia
- Party: Polish People's Party

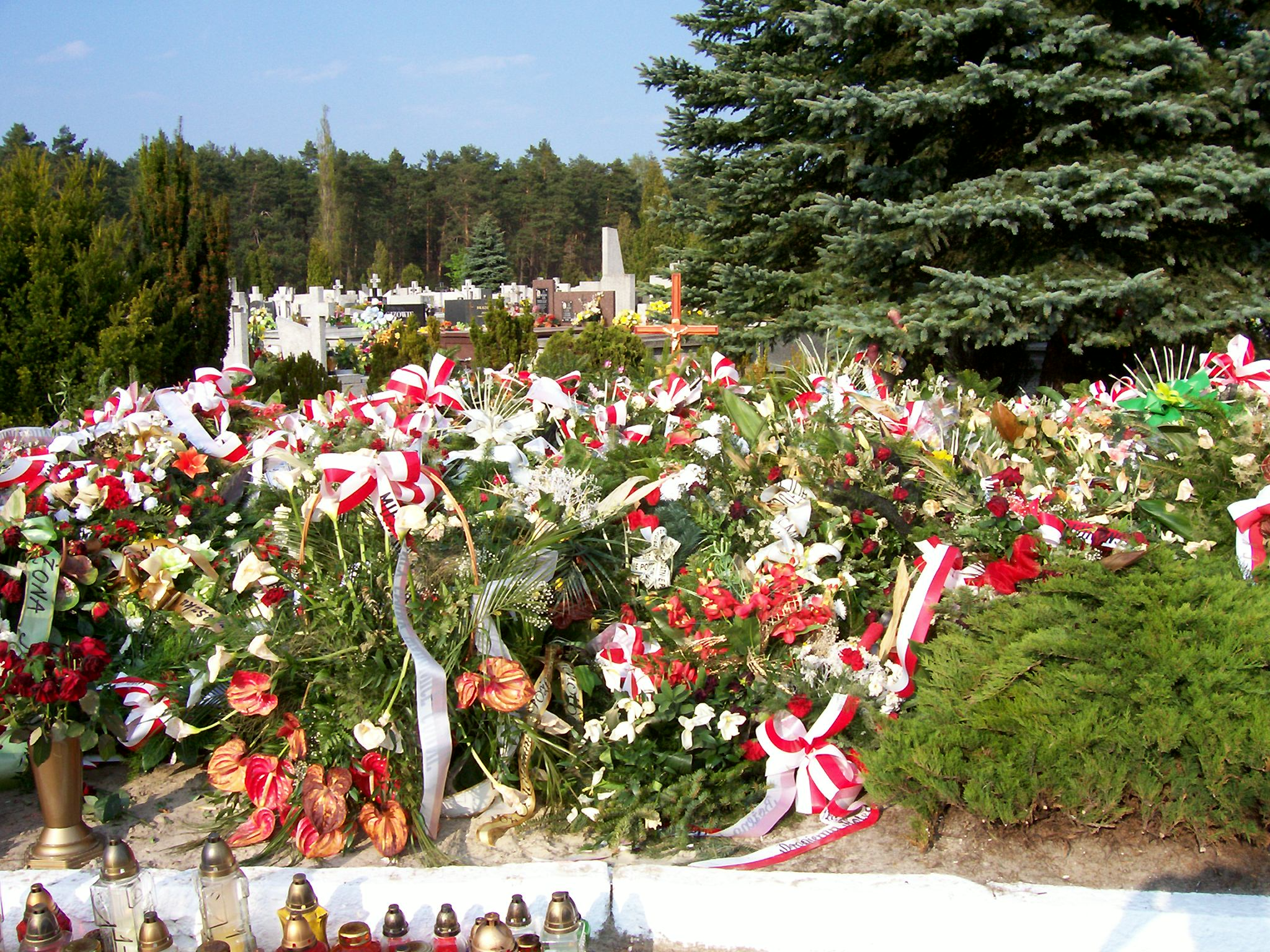
Leszek Deptuła-grave in Mielec

Leszek Roman Deptuła (25 February 1953 – 10 April 2010) was a Polish veterinarian and politician, member of the Sejm. He was born in Żagań.

Deptulas was listed on the flight manifest of the Tupolev Tu-154 of the 36th Special Aviation Regiment carrying the President of Poland Lech Kaczyński which crashed near Smolensk-North airport near Pechersk near Smolensk, Russia, on 10 April 2010, killing all aboard.

On 16 April 2010 Deptulas was decorated posthumously with the Commander's Cross of the Order of Polonia Restituta. Four days later, he was buried at the municipal cemetery in Mielec.
