= Radość =

Radość may refer to:

- Radość, Warsaw, a neighbourhood in Warsaw, Masovian Voivodeship, Poland
  - Warszawa Radość railway station
- Radość, Sokołów County, village in the Masovian Voivodeship, Warsaw
- Radość, Subcarpathian Voivodeship, a village in the Subcarpathian Voivodeship, Poland
