= Czarna (tributary of Łęg) =

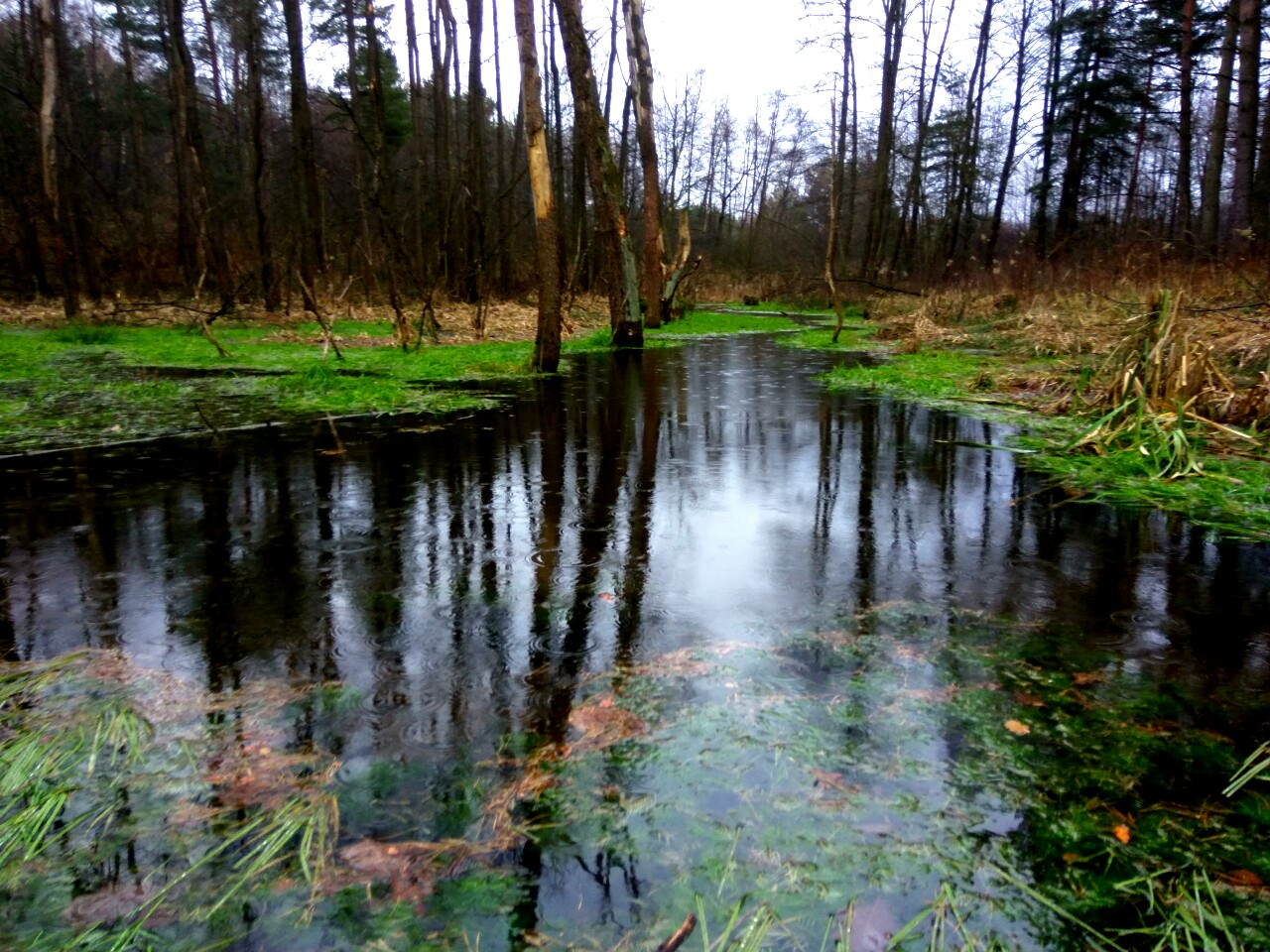
- Beaver pond on the Czarna

Location
- Country: Poland

Physical characteristics
- Mouth
  - location: Łęg
  - coordinates: 50.198025°N 21.938275°E
- Length: 3 km (1.9 mi)

The Czarna [ˈt͡ʂarna] is a small watercourse in south-eastern Poland. With a length of 3 kilometres (2 miles), the Czarna constitutes a right-bank tributary of the Łęg River. Its source is in the village of Styków in Subcarpathian Voivodeship.
