= Bogdan Rzońca =

Polish politician (born 1961)

Bogdan Rzońca MEP
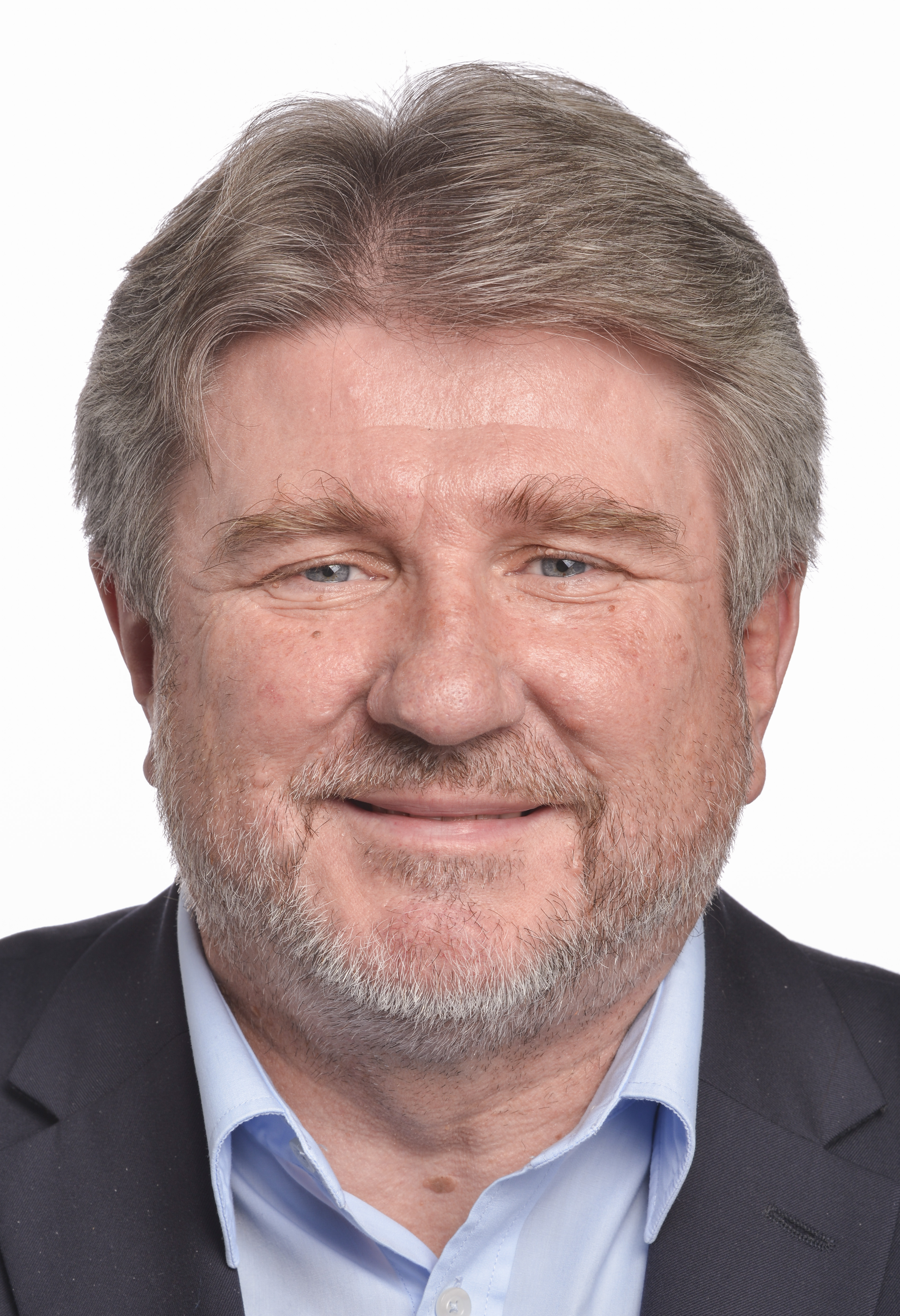

Member of the European Parliament for Subcarpathian
- Incumbent
- Assumed office 2 July 2019
- Parliamentary group: European Conservatives and Reformists

Deputy of the Sejm
- In office 2011 – 2019
- Succeeded by: Adam Śnieżek
- Constituency: 22 Krosno

Marshal of Subcarpathian Voivodeship
- In office 1 January 1999 – 22 November 2002
- Preceded by: Position established
- Succeeded by: Leszek Deptuła

Voivode of Krosno
- In office 1997 – 1998
- Preceded by: Piotr Komornicki
- Succeeded by: Position abolished

Personal details
- Born: 1 February 1961 (age 65) Zarzecze, Polish People's Republic
- Party: Law and Justice (2006–)
- Other political affiliations: Solidarity Electoral Action (1999–2002); Christian National Union (1997–1998)
- Education: Kraków Higher School of Education
- Awards: Order of Polonia Restituta

Bogdan Józef Rzońca (born 1 June 1961) is a Polish politician currently serving as a Member of the European Parliament for the Law and Justice political party. He was a deputy of the Sejm from 2011 to 2019.
