= Adam Dziedzic =

Polish politician (born 1969)

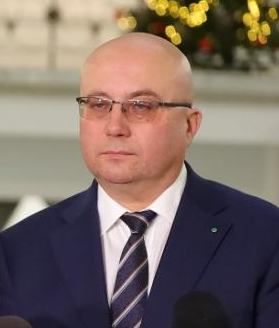
- Adam Dziedzic

Member of the Sejm
- Incumbent
- Assumed office 13 November 2023
- Constituency: Rzeszów

Personal details
- Born: 26 September 1969 (age 56)
- Party: Polish People's Party
- Other political affiliations: Third Way

Adam Dziedzic (born 26 September 1969) is a Polish politician serving as a member of the Sejm since 2023. From 2014 to 2023, he served as mayor of Świlcza.
