= Pagórek, Podkarpackie Voivodeship =

Pagórek
- Village
- Location within Poland
- Coordinates: 49°40′49″N 21°21′21″E
- Country: Poland
- Voivodeship: Subcarpathian
- County: Jasło
- Gmina: Dębowiec
- Population: 208
- Website: http://www.pagorek.lukasz.boo.pl

Pagórek [paˈɡurɛk] is a village in the administrative district of Gmina Dębowiec, within Jasło County, Subcarpathian Voivodeship, in south-eastern Poland.
