= Dębowiec, Podkarpackie Voivodeship =

Dębowiec
- Village
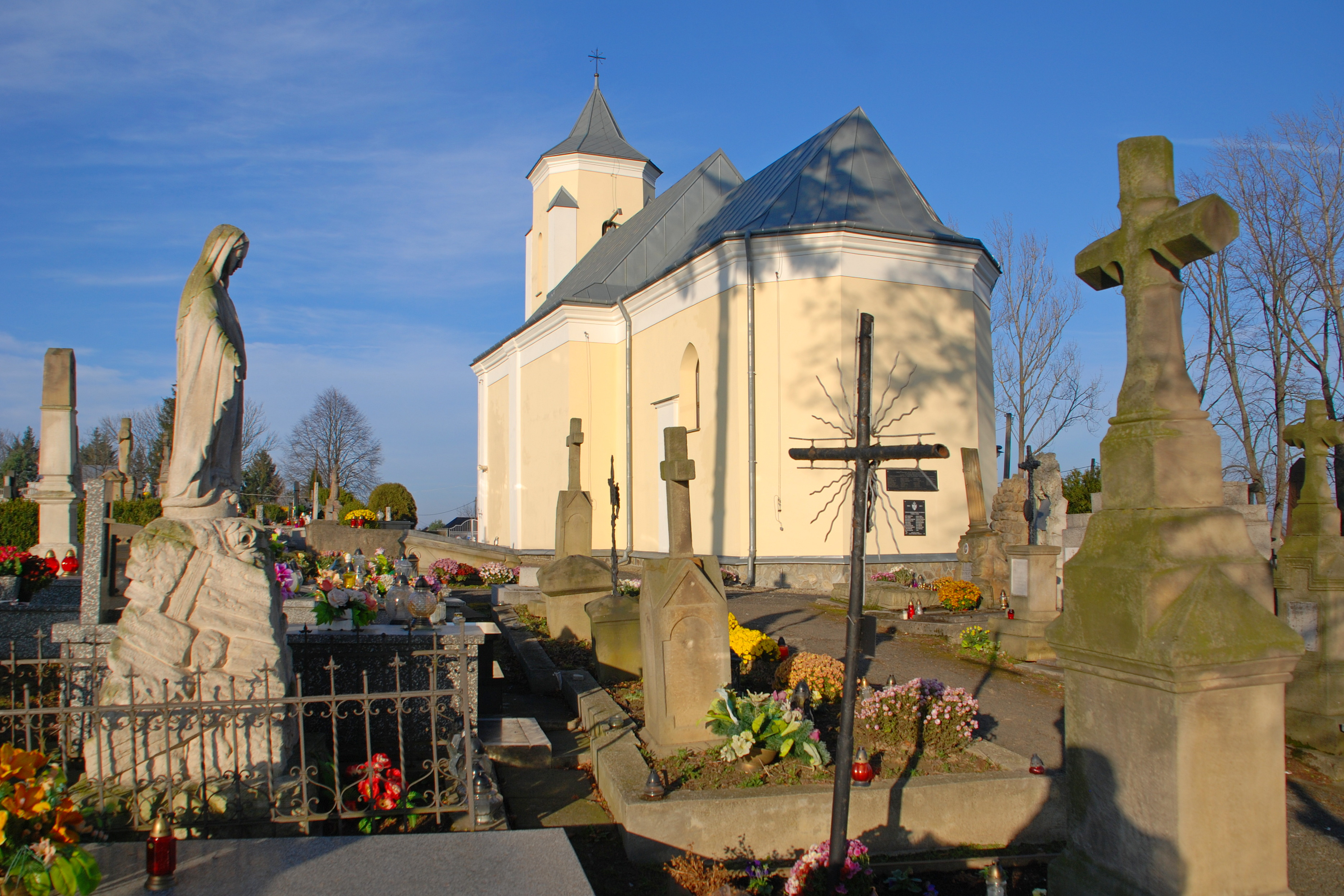
- Local church and cemetery

- Location within Poland
- Coordinates: 49°41′1″N 21°27′36″E
- Country: Poland
- Voivodeship: Subcarpathian
- County: Jasło
- Gmina: Dębowiec
- Population: 2,000

Dębowiec [dɛmˈbɔvjɛt͡s] is a village in Jasło County, Subcarpathian Voivodeship, in south-eastern Poland. It is the seat of the gmina (administrative district) called Gmina Dębowiec.

Debowiec has a long and rich history. For centuries it was a town, located in southeastern corner of the historic province of Lesser Poland. Until the Partitions of Poland, Debowiec belonged to Biecz County of Krakow Voivodeship.

In the early Middle Ages, Debowiec was a gord, located in sparsely inhabited areas of Carpathian foothills. In the 11th century, Benedictine monks from Tyniec encouraged settlers to come to this corner of Lesser Poland. Debowiec was a village, destroyed in 1241, during the Mongol invasion of Poland. Asiatic hordes returned in 1259–1260 and 1287–1288, bringing further destruction.

On 15 August 1349, King Casimir III the Great granted Magdeburg rights to Debowiec. By that time, Debowiec had already been a local center of administration, as first mention of a Roman Catholic parish of St. Bartholomew existing here dates back to 1328. According to some sources, Debowiec had been granted town charter as early as 13th century, and in 1349, Casimir changed the charter from Polish to German (Magdeburg rights). First known vogt of Debowiec was Mikolaj of Bakow. On May 13, 1365, Casimir III visited Debowiec.

By early 15th century, Debowiec had a number of artisans, and among its most famous owners was knight Marcin of Wrocimowice, who resided here in 1433–1442. His son, Marcin of Debowiec was captured by Turks during the Battle of Varna, and spent 20 years in Turkish captivity.

In 1471, Debowiec burned in a great fire, and three years later the town was raided by Hungarian troops under Thomas Tarczay, which burned all local villages, together with Debowiec and its church (January 1474). In 1494, Debowiec was flooded, and in 1496–1497, the town was affected by a plague. Furthermore, in 1498 Debowiec was raided by Crimean Tatars and Wallachians, who burned all towns and villages of Carpathian foothills.

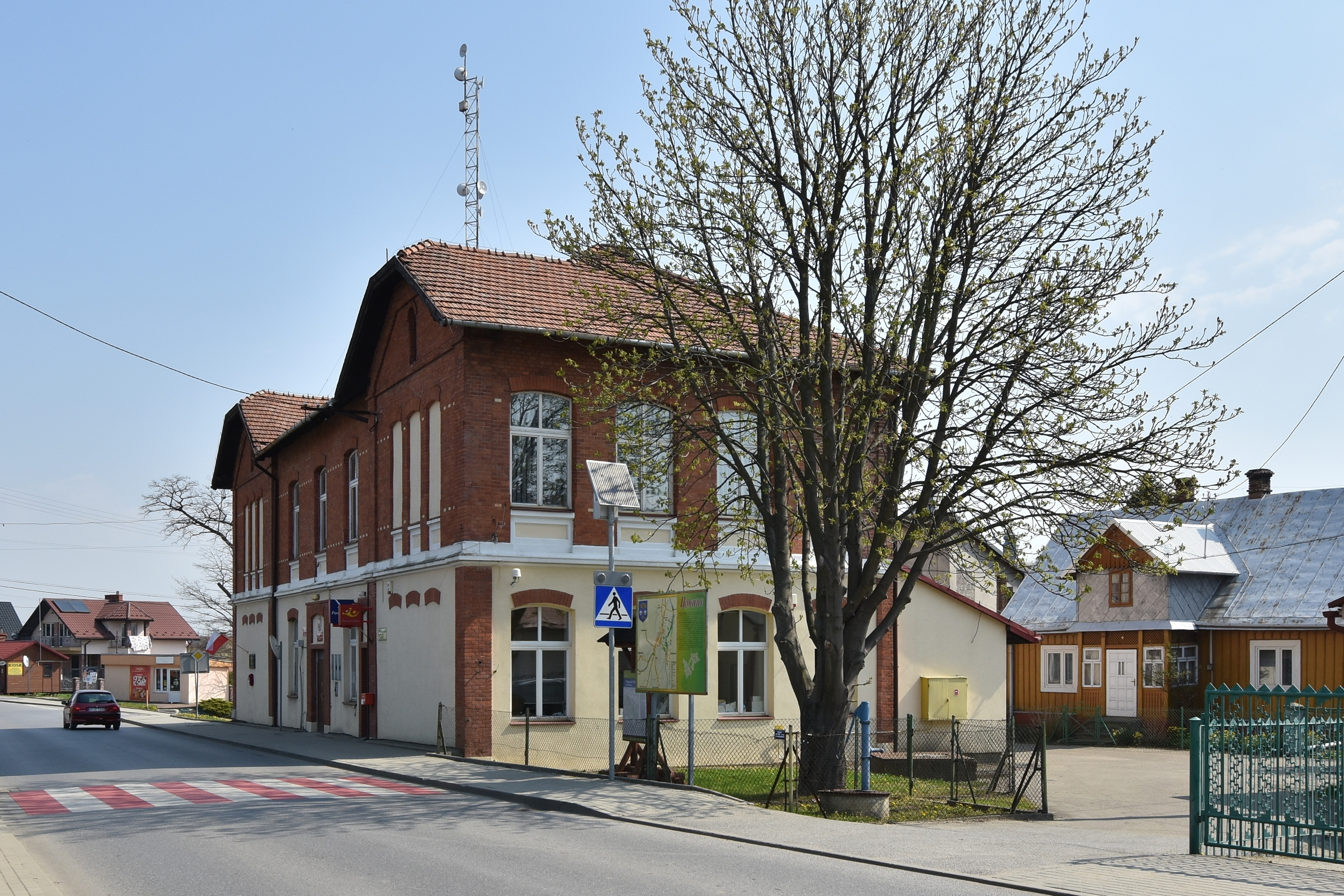
Local post office

Debowiec prospered in the period known as Polish Golden Age. Even though the town and its castle burned in 1512, it was quickly rebuilt, and became a local trade center, with a brewery, wine cellars, tax office, watermill and other businesses. In 1528, Debowiec was named seat of a starosta, and in 1535, royal privilege was issued, granting the right for Monday fairs.

In 1571 Jadwiga Tarlo, future wife of Jerzy Mniszech, was named the starosta of Debowiec. She married Mniszech in 1586, and the couple settled at the Debowiec Castle. In 1605, the Mniszechs hosted envoys of False Dmitriy I, who asked for the hand of their daughter Marina. On May 8, 1606, Marina Mniszech married Dmitriy in Moscow.

In 1624, Debowiec was once again raided by Crimean Tatars, and on April 1, 1626, almost whole town burned in a great fire, after which only parish church and seven houses stood. The Tatars returned in 1629 and 1654, while in 1655, Debowiec was looted by Swedes, during the Deluge (history). On March 19, 1657, Debowiec was burned and its residents murdered by Transilvanians of George II Rakoczi. After the wars of the mid-17th century, Debowiec never recovered and declined in importance. In 1769, a battle of the Bar Confederation took place here, and three years later, the town was annexed by the Habsburg Empire.

Debowiec remained in Austrian Galicia until 1918. In 1806, the army of Mikhail Kutuzov marched through the town after the Battle of Austerlitz. Local peasants actively participated in the so-called Galician slaughter (1846), while 26 patriots from Debowiec fought in the January Uprising. Due to widespread poverty, a number of local residents left Debowiec and adjacent villages in the late 19th and early 20th century, emigrating either to the United States or Brazil.

In September 1914 (First World War), Debowiec was seized by Russian army, which retreated after two days. In 1934, Debowiec was affected by the 1934 flood in Poland, and on July 26 of the same year, it lost its town charter. In 1937, local peasants took part in the 1937 peasant strike in Poland.
