= Majscowa =

- Village
- Location within Poland
- Coordinates: 49°43′N 21°29′E
- Country: Poland
- Voivodeship: Subcarpathian
- County: Jasło
- Gmina: Dębowiec

Majscowa [mai̯sˈt͡sɔva] is a village in the administrative district of Gmina Dębowiec, within Jasło County, Subcarpathian Voivodeship, in south-eastern Poland.
