= Wola Dębowiecka =

- Village
- Location within Poland
- Coordinates: 49°39′N 21°27′E
- Country: Poland
- Voivodeship: Subcarpathian
- County: Jasło
- Gmina: Dębowiec
- Elevation: 260 m (850 ft)
- Population: 672

Wola Dębowiecka [ˈvɔla dɛmbɔˈvjɛt͡ska] is a village in the administrative district of Gmina Dębowiec, within Jasło County, Subcarpathian Voivodeship, in south-eastern Poland.
