= Łęg (river) =

River in Poland

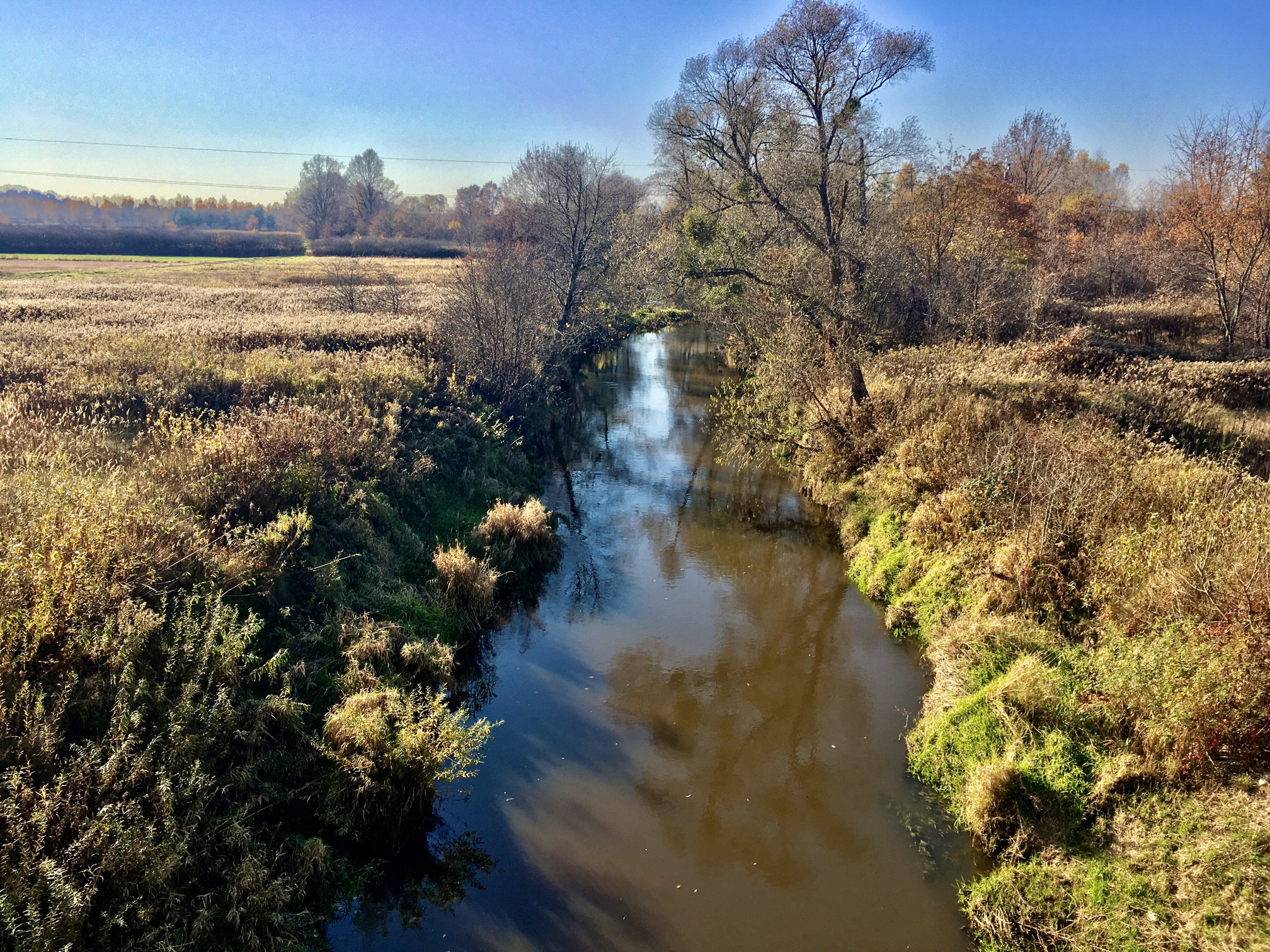
- Łęg River near Bojanów

Location
- Country: Poland

Physical characteristics
- Source
  - location: Kolbuszowa Plateau
  - coordinates: 50°10′33″N 21°57′08″E
- Mouth
  - location: Vistula
  - coordinates: 50°41′25″N 21°49′19″E
- Length: 85.51 km (53.13 mi)
- Basin size: 960.2 km^{2} (370.7 sq mi)

Basin features
- Progression: Vistula→ Baltic Sea

The Łęg [wɛŋk] is a river in south-eastern Poland, and a right-bank tributary of the Vistula River. The Łęg has a length of 85.51 kilometres (53 miles) and a basin area of 960.2 square kilometres (371 sq mi). Its source is in the village of Styków in Subcarpathian Voivodeship.

== Tributaries ==
Tributaries of the Łęg include:

- Czarna
- Turka
- Przyrwa
- Murynia

== See also ==
- Rivers of Poland
