= Krzysztof Sobolewski =

Polish politician

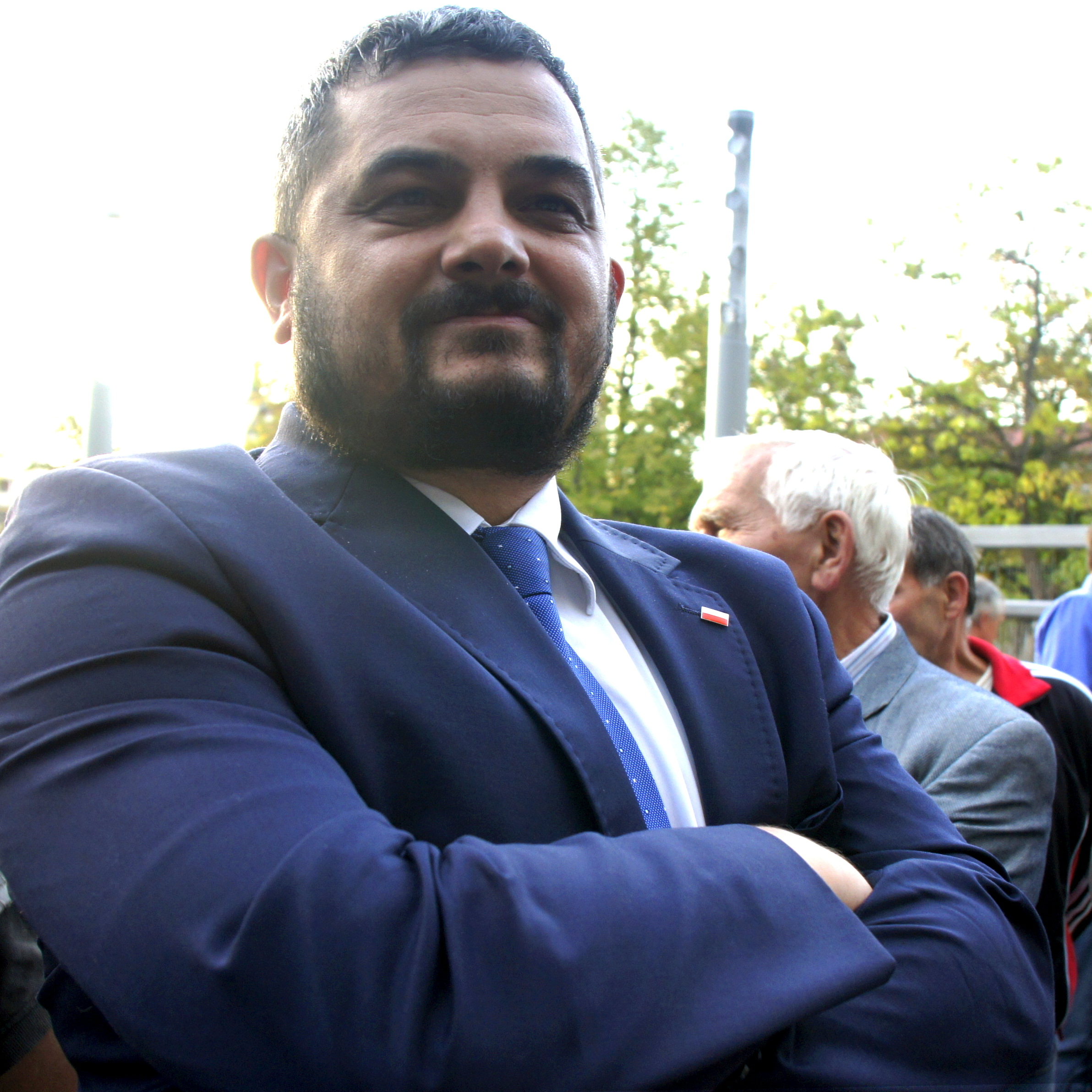

Chair of the Executive Committee of Law and Justice
- In office 27 January 2018 – 4 July 2021
- Preceded by: Joachim Brudziński
- Succeeded by: Mariusz Błaszczak

Member of the Sejm
- Incumbent
- Assumed office 12 November 2019
- Constituency: 23 - Rzeszów

General Secretary of Law and Justice
- In office 4 July 2021 – 25 October 2023
- Preceded by: Jarosław Zieliński
- Succeeded by: Piotr Milowański (acting)

Personal details
- Born: 20 September 1978 (age 48) Radymno, Polish People's Republic
- Party: Law and Justice
- Education: Maria Curie-Skłodowska University

Krzysztof Sobolewski (born 20 September 1978) is a Polish politician and former local government official who was the chair of the Executive Committee of Law and Justice (PiS) from 2018 to 2021. In 2021 he became General Secretary of PiS and retained this position until October 2023 when he resigned in aftermath of PiS' loss of 2023 election.

He holds a degree in administration from the Faculty of Law and Administration of Maria Curie-Skłodowska University. Having joined Law and Justice in 2003, he initially worked for Marek Kuchciński in Przemyśl. From 2005 to 2007 he was employed in the Podkarpackie Voivodeship Office in Rzeszów. From 2014 to 2018, Sobolewski sat on the council of the central borough of the City of Warsaw.

In 2018 he replaced Joachim Brudziński (who had been appointed as the Minister of Interior and Administration) as chair of the Executive Committee of Law and Justice. Sobolewski was elected as a member of the Sejm in the 2019 from Rzeszów Constituency . Afterwards he assumed office of the chair of the Polish-Ukrainian Parliamentary Group, which he led during until 2023.

Sobolewski came to the attention of the Polish media in 2020, when it was reveled that his wife after marrying him in 2017 became employed on various high ranking positions in multiple state-owned enterprises (SOEs) due to her husband's role within the ruling party. The case of Sobolewski's wife alongside other examples of nepotism among PiS' politicians showed by media met with reaction of Jarosław Kaczyński - leader of PiS - who during party congress in 2021 spoke about "syndrome of 'fat cats' " and the need to fight nepotism within party ranks. Kaczyński's speech led to adoption of the resolution during the said congress which prohibited "spouses, children, siblings and parents" of party's members of parliament from working in SOEs and forced Sobolewski's wife to resign. However the resolution proved itself to be ineffective and included numerous loopholes which allowed distant relatives of politicians to continue their careers in SOEs. This led to accusations of the media that the entire attempt to fight nepotism within PiS is fake and aims to improve the image of party without targeting the real problem. Additionally Sobolewski's wife while prohibited from working in SOEs, continued her business career in local waste management company in Kamień Pomorski.

On 25 October 2023, 10 days after the election in which PiS lost majority in Sejm, Deputy Leader of PiS Antoni Macierewicz announced that Sobolewski has stepped down as General Secretary of the party and was succeeded by his deputy Piotr Milowański. Anonymous interlocutors who are members PiS pointed out the lack of effectiveness in mobilizing local party structures during the campaign, underperforming election result and scandals surrounding his wife's employment as three main reasons that led to Sobolewski's resignation.
