= Sejm Constituency no. 15 =

Polish parliamentary constituency

Tarnów
- Polish: Okręg wyborczy Tarnów
- Constituency for the National Assembly of the Republic of Poland
- Boundary of the Tarnów Constituency in Poland for the 2011 general election.
- Counties in Lesser Poland Voivodeship: Bochnia, Brzesko, Dąbrowa, Proszowice, Tarnów, and Wieliczka
- City Counties in Lesser Poland Voivodeship: Tarnów

Current constituency
- Sejm Deputies: 9
- Sejm District: 15
- European Parliament constituency: Lesser Poland and Świętokrzyskie
- Voivodeship sejmik: Lesser Poland Regional Assembly

Tarnów is a Polish parliamentary constituency in the Lesser Poland Voivodeship. It elects twelve members of the Sejm and three members of the Senate.

The district has the number '15' for elections to the Sejm and the Senate, and is named after the city of Tarnów. It includes the counties of Bochnia, Brzesko, Dąbrowa, Proszowice, Tarnów, Wieliczka and the city-county of Tarnów.

== List of members ==
=== 2019-2023 ===
Member	Party
Urszula Augustyn	Civic Coalition
Stanisław Bukowiec	Law and Justice
Norbert Kaczmarczyk	Law and Justice
Władysław Kosiniak-Kamysz	Polish People's Party
Wiesław Krajewski	Law and Justice
Anna Pieczarka	Law and Justice
Urszula Rusecka	Law and Justice
Piotr Sak	Law and Justice
Józefa Szczurek-Żelazko	Law and Justice

=== 2023-2027 ===
Member	Party
Urszula Augustyn	Civic Coalition
Piotr Górnikiewicz	Poland 2050
Norbert Kaczmarczyk	Law and Justice
Władysław Kosiniak-Kamysz	Polish People's Party
Wiesław Krajewski	Law and Justice
Anna Pieczarka	Law and Justice
Urszula Rusecka	Law and Justice
Józefa Szczurek-Żelazko	Law and Justice
Robert Wardzała	Civic Coalition
