= Mieczysław Golba =

Polish politician (born 1966)

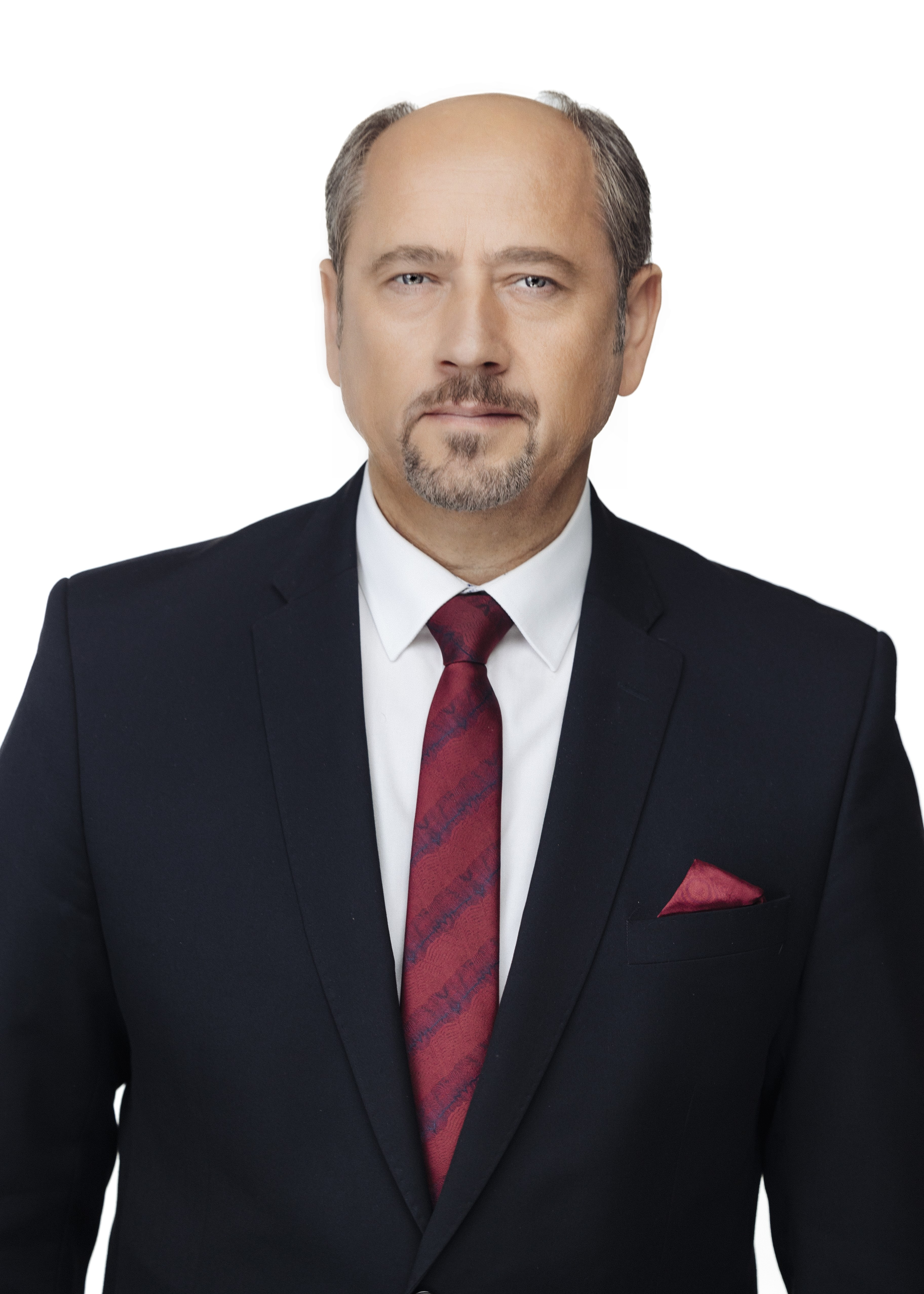

member of Sejm 2005-2007
- In office 25 September 2005 – ?

Personal details
- Born: Mieczysław Józef Golba; 24 April 1966 (age 59)
- Party: Law and Justice (2005–2011); United Poland (2011–)

Mieczysław Józef Golba (born 24 April 1966 in Jarosław) is a Polish politician. He was elected to the Sejm on 25 September 2005, getting 5551 votes in 22 Krosno district as a candidate from the Law and Justice list.

On 4 November 2011 he, along with 15 other supporters of the dismissed PiS MEP Zbigniew Ziobro, left Law and Justice on ideological grounds to form a breakaway group, United Poland.

== See also ==
- Members of Polish Sejm 2005-2007
