= Dariusz Matecki =

Polish politician (born 1989)

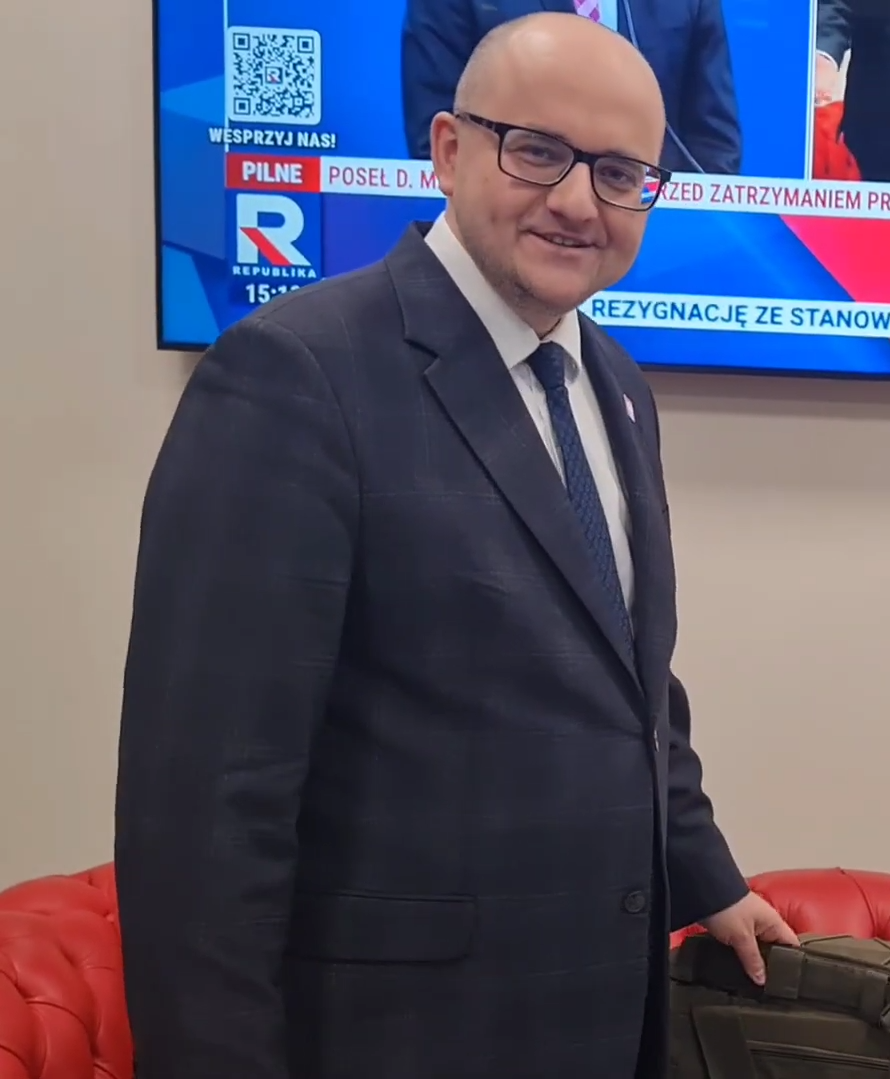
- Dariusz Matecki (March 6th, 2025)

Member of the Sejm
- Incumbent
- Assumed office 13 November 2023
- Constituency: Szczecin

Personal details
- Born: 6 February 1989 (age 37)
- Party: Law and Justice (since 2024)
- Other political affiliations: Sovereign Poland (2012–2024)

Dariusz Matecki (born 6 February 1989) is a Polish politician serving as a member of the Sejm since 2023. From 2018 to 2023, he was a city councillor of Szczecin. He worked at State Forests.
