= Stanisław Bukowiec =

Polish journalist and politician

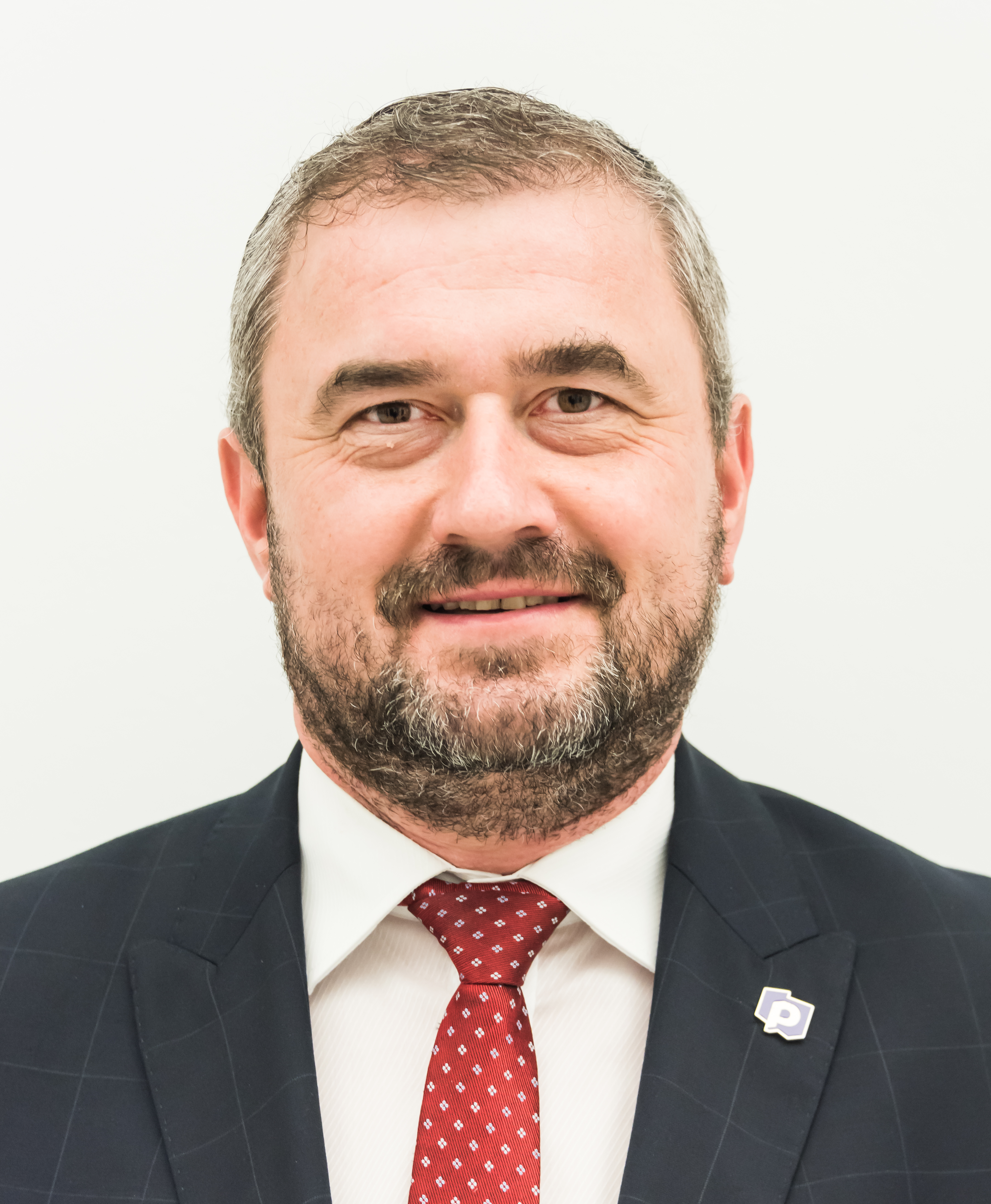

Town Councilor of Bochnia
- In office 1998–2005

Mayor of Bochnia
- In office 2005–2014

Member of the Sejmik of the Lesser Poland Voivodeship
- In office 2018–2019

Member of the Sejm
- Incumbent
- Assumed office 2019

Personal details
- Born: 8 November 1972 (age 53)
- Party: Agreement
- Education: Jagiellonian University
- Occupation: Politician, journalist, publisher, activist

Stanisław Marcin Bukowiec (born 8 November 1972 in Bochnia) is a Polish journalist, publisher, activist, politician, and member of the IX Sejm from the 15th constituency (Tarnów).

From 1998 to 2005 town councilor of Bochnia, from 2005 to 2014 mayor of that town. In 2018 he was elected to the sejmik of the Lesser Poland Voivodeship. He was elected to Sejm in the 2019 Polish Parliamentary elections from the lists of Law and Justice with 12,449 votes.

He is a member of the Agreement political party, having earlier been an activist in Poland Together.

He is married and has two children.
