= Łazy Dębowieckie =

- Village
- Location within Poland
- Coordinates: 49°41′N 21°26′E
- Country: Poland
- Voivodeship: Subcarpathian
- County: Jasło
- Gmina: Dębowiec

Łazy Dębowieckie [ˈwazɨ dɛmbɔˈvjɛt͡skʲɛ] is a village in the administrative district of Gmina Dębowiec, within Jasło County, Subcarpathian Voivodeship, in south-eastern Poland.
