= Gmina Dębowiec, Subcarpathian Voivodeship =

Gmina Dębowiec Dębowiec Commune
- Gmina
- Coat of arms
- Interactive map of Gmina Dębowiec
- Coordinates (Dębowiec): 49°41′1″N 21°27′36″E
- Country: Poland
- Voivodeship: Subcarpathian
- County: Jasło
- Seat: Dębowiec

Area
  - Total: 85.81 km^{2} (33.13 sq mi)

Population (2006)
  - Total: 8,406
  - Density: 97.96/km^{2} (253.7/sq mi)
- Website: http://www.debowiec.pl/

Gmina Dębowiec is a rural gmina (administrative district) in Jasło County, Subcarpathian Voivodeship, in south-eastern Poland. Its seat is the village of Dębowiec, which lies approximately 8 kilometres (5 mi) south of Jasło and 56 km (35 mi) south-west of the regional capital Rzeszów.

The gmina covers an area of 85.81 square kilometres (33.1 sq mi), and as of 2006 its total population is 8,406.

== Villages ==
Gmina Dębowiec contains the villages and settlements of Cieklin, Dębowiec, Dobrynia, Duląbka, Dzielec, Folusz, Łazy Dębowieckie, Majscowa, Pagórek, Radość, Wola Cieklińska, Wola Dębowiecka and Zarzecze.

== Neighbouring gminas ==
Gmina Dębowiec is bordered by the gminas of Jasło, Lipinki, Nowy Żmigród, Osiek Jasielski, Sękowa and Tarnowiec.
