= Wola Cieklińska =

- Village
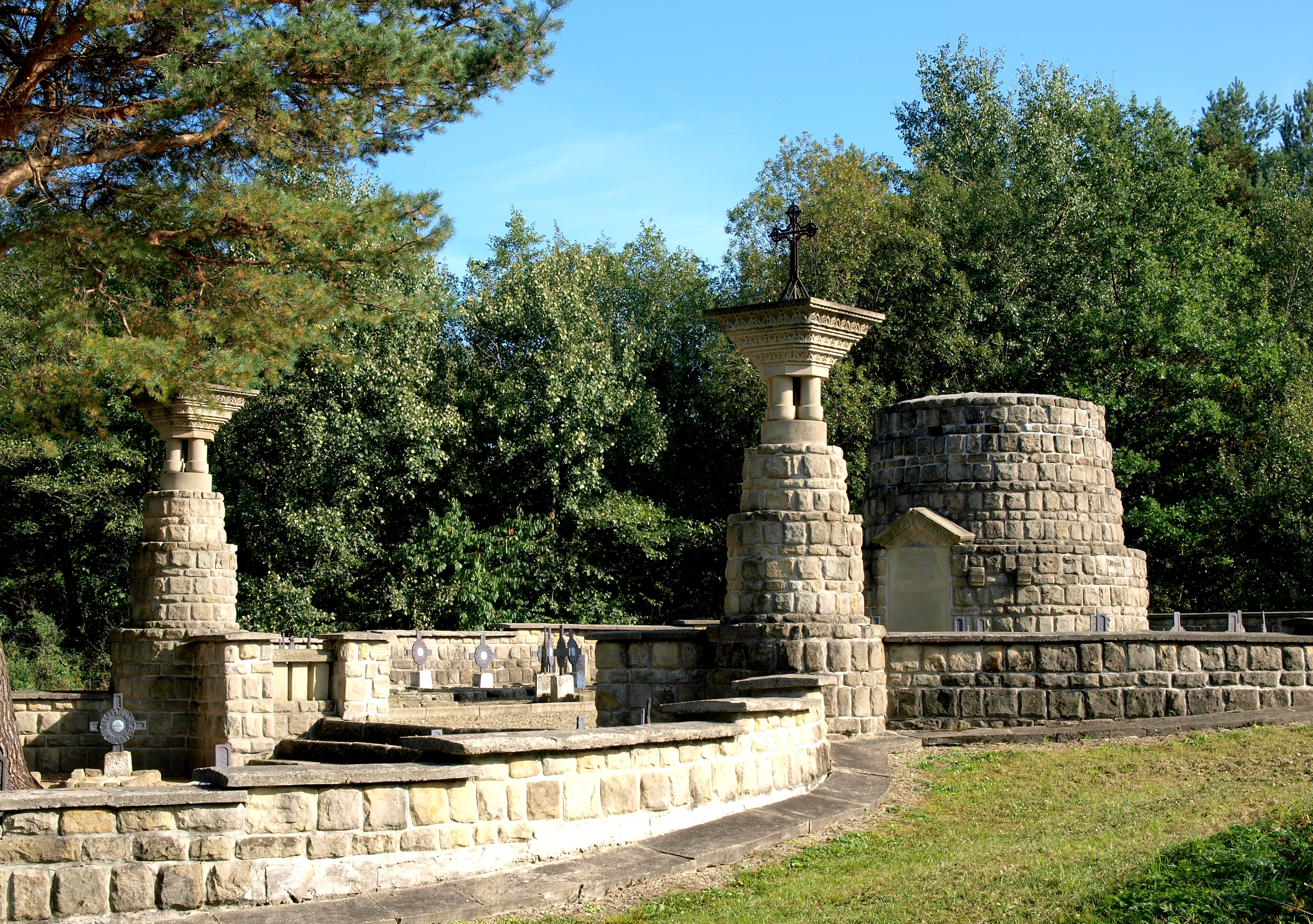
- World War I cemetery in Wola Cieklińska

- Location within Poland
- Coordinates: 49°39′N 21°23′E
- Country: Poland
- Voivodeship: Subcarpathian
- County: Jasło
- Gmina: Dębowiec
- Time zone: UTC+1 (CET)
  - Summer (DST): UTC+2 (CEST)
- Vehicle registration: RJS

Wola Cieklińska [ˈvɔla t͡ɕɛˈklʲiɲska] is a village in the administrative district of Gmina Dębowiec, within Jasło County, Subcarpathian Voivodeship, in south-eastern Poland.

Four Polish citizens were murdered by Nazi Germany in the village during World War II.
