= Anna Pieczarka =

Polish politician (born 1977)

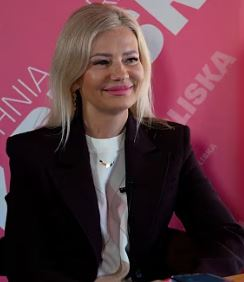

Member of the Sejm
- Incumbent
- Assumed office 12 November 2019
- Constituency: Tarnów

Personal details
- Born: 15 February 1977 (age 49)
- Party: Law and Justice

Anna Pieczarka (born 15 February 1977) is a Polish politician serving as a member of the Sejm since 2019. From 2018 to 2019, she was a member of the executive board of Lesser Poland Voivodeship.
