= Norbert Kaczmarczyk =

Polish politician (born 1989)

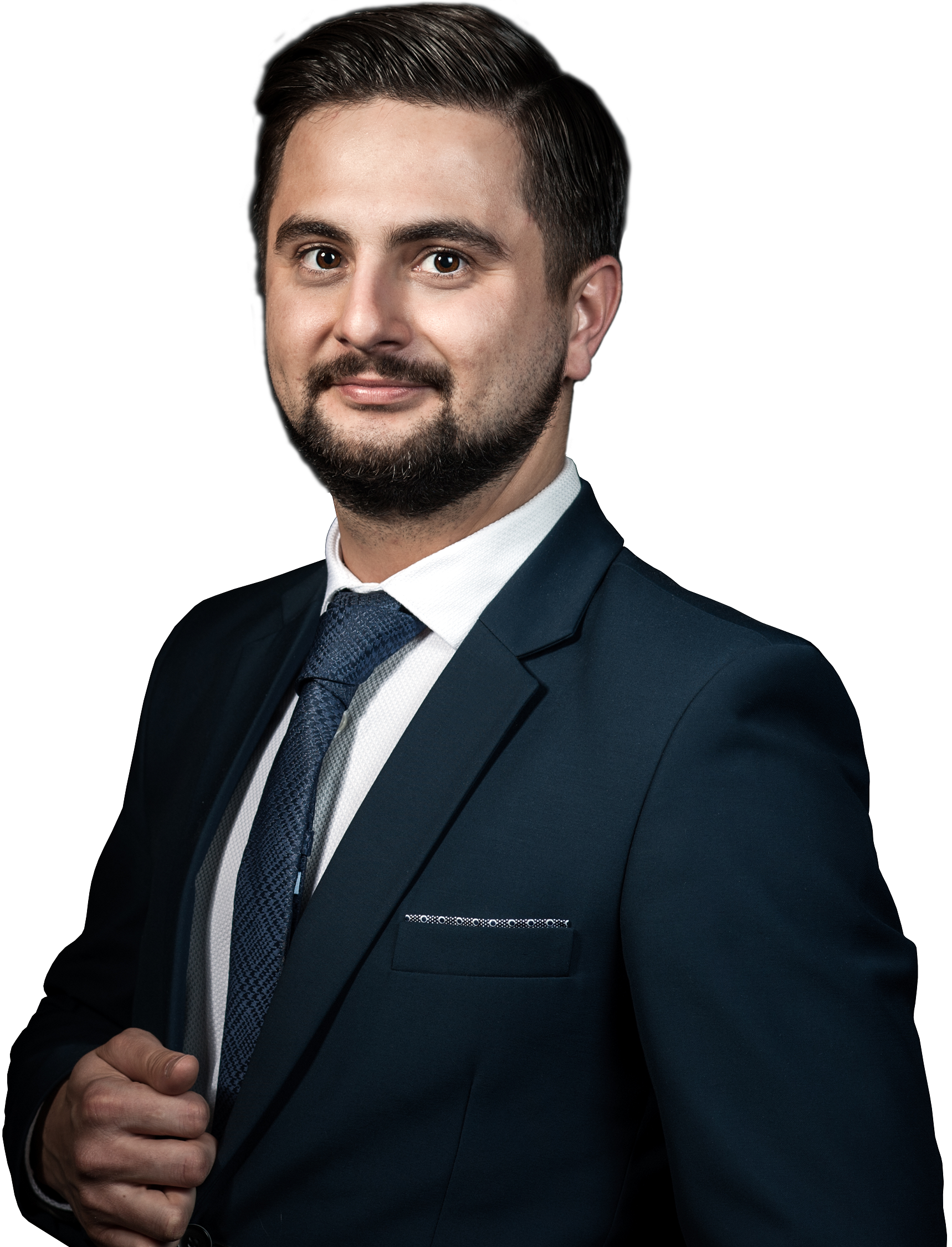
- Kaczmarczyk in 2019

Member of the Sejm
- Incumbent
- Assumed office 12 November 2015
- Constituency: Tarnów

Personal details
- Born: 16 November 1989 (age 36)
- Party: Law and Justice (since 2024)
- Other political affiliations: Sovereign Poland (2019–2024)

Norbert Kaczmarczyk (born 16 November 1989) is a Polish politician serving as a member of the Sejm since 2015. From 2021 to 2022, he served as deputy minister of agriculture and rural development.
