= Cieklin =

- Village
- Location within Poland
- Coordinates: 49°39′N 21°23′E
- Country: Poland
- Voivodeship: Subcarpathian
- County: Jasło
- Gmina: Dębowiec
- Population (approx.): 1,200
- Website: http://www.cieklin-ski.pl

Cieklin is a village in the administrative district of Gmina Dębowiec, within Jasło County, Subcarpathian Voivodeship, in south-eastern Poland.

The village was founded in the 13th century. It has a museum of skiing, and has been claimed to be the birthplace of skiing in Poland, the local history of the sport going back to the 19th century.
