= Sejm Constituency no. 23 =

Polish parliamentary constituency

Sejm Constituency no. 23 Rzeszów
- Okręg wyborczy nr 23; Rzeszów
- Constituency for the Sejm
- Location within Poland
- Counties: Rzeszów (city county), Tarnobrzeg (city county), Dębica, Kolbuszowa, Leżajsk, Łańcut, Mielec, Nisko, Ropczyce-Sędziszów, Rzeszów, Stalowa Wola, Strzyżów, Tarnobrzeg
- Voivodeship: Subcarpathian Voivodeship
- Electorate: 955,621 (2023)

Current constituency
- Created: 2001
- Seats: 15
- Regional assembly: Subcarpathian Voivodeship Sejmik
- Senate constituency: No. 54, 55, and 56
- EP constituency: Podkarpackie

Rzeszów, officially known as Constituency no. 23, is a Polish parliamentary constituency in the Subcarpathian Voivodeship. It elects fifteen members of the Sejm.

The seat of the district's electoral commission is in Rzeszów.

== List of deputies ==
Deputies for the 10th Sejm (2023–2027)
Deputy	Party	Parliamentary group
Zbigniew Ziobro	Sovereign Poland	Law and Justice
Ewa Leniart	Law and Justice	Law and Justice
Rafał Weber	Law and Justice	Law and Justice
Marcin Warchoł	Sovereign Poland	Law and Justice
Zbigniew Chmielowiec	Law and Justice	Law and Justice
Krzysztof Sobolewski	Law and Justice	Law and Justice
Fryderyk Kapinos	Law and Justice	Law and Justice
Kazimierz Gołojuch	Law and Justice	Law and Justice
Jan Warzecha	Law and Justice	Law and Justice
Paweł Kowal	Independent	Civic Coalition
Krystyna Skowrońska	Civic Platform	Civic Coalition
Zdzisław Gawlik	Civic Platform	Civic Coalition
Adam Dziedzic	Polish People's Party	Third Way
Elżbieta Burkiewicz	Poland 2050	Third Way
Grzegorz Braun	KKP	Confederation

== Election results ==
=== 2023 ===
2023 parliamentary election: Rzeszów
Electoral committee	Votes	%	Seats
Law and Justice	347,688	51.60	9
Civic Coalition	119,259	17.70	3
Third Way	83,676	12.42	2
Confederation	63,854	9.48	1
The Left	32,828	4.87	–
There is One Poland	16,169	2.40	–
Bezpartyjni Samorządowcy	10,302	1.53	–
Total	673,776	100.00	15
Valid votes	673,776	98.73	
Invalid/blank votes	8,698	1.27	
Total votes	682,474	100.00	
Registered voters/turnout	955,621	71.42	
Source: National Electoral Commission
