= Dzielec, Podkarpackie Voivodeship =

Dzielec
- Village
- Location within Poland
- Coordinates: 49°40′30″N 21°22′40″E
- Country: Poland
- Voivodeship: Subcarpathian
- County: Jasło
- Gmina: Dębowiec
- Elevation: 222 m (728 ft)
- Population: 203

Dzielec [ˈd͡ʑɛlɛt͡s] is a village in the administrative district of Gmina Dębowiec, within Jasło County, Subcarpathian Voivodeship, in south-eastern Poland.
