= Ewa Leniart =

Polish politician (born 1976)

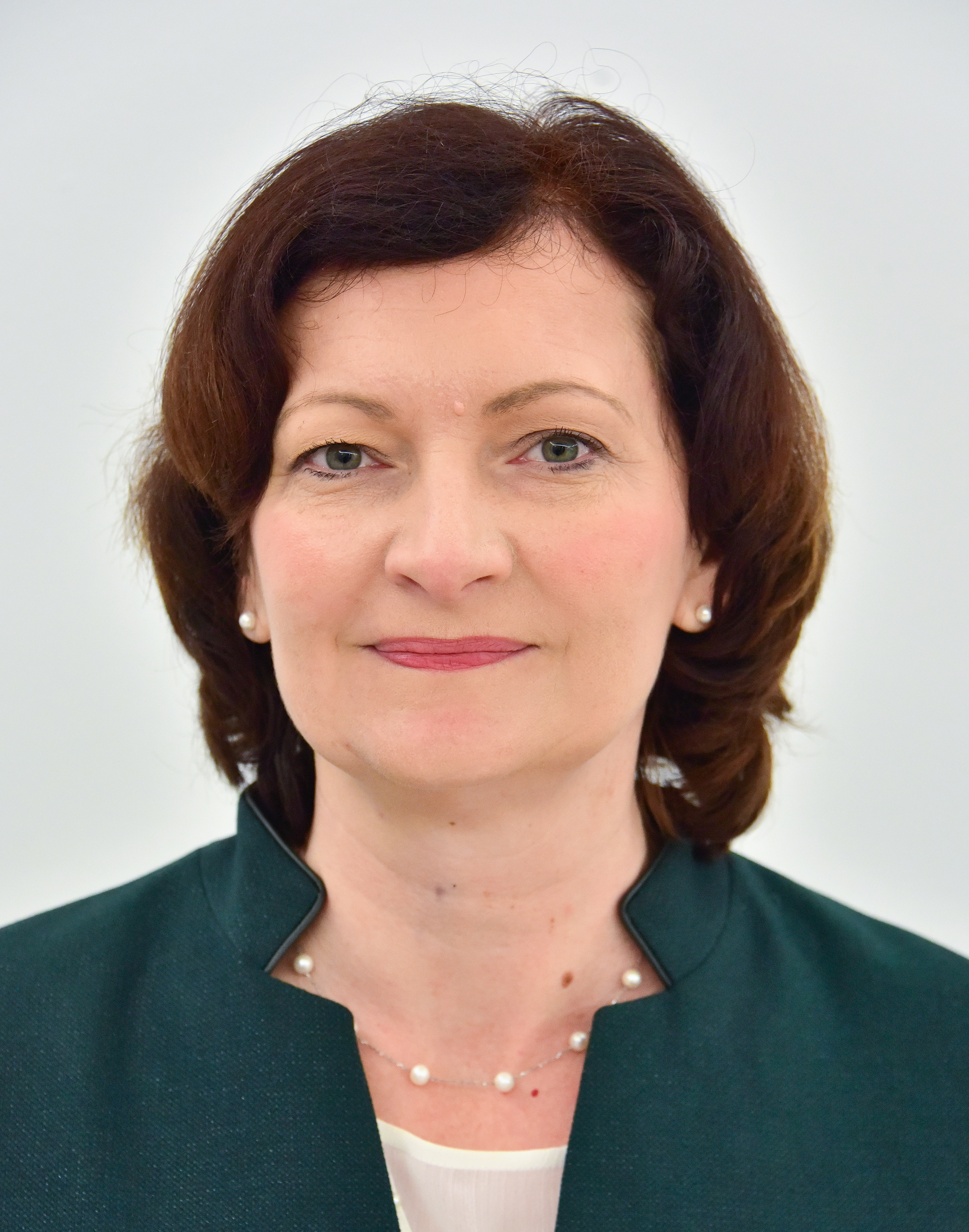

Member of the Sejm
- In office 2019–Incumbent

Voivode of Subcarpathian Voivodeship
- In office 13 January 2020 – 2 November 2023
- Prime Minister: Mateusz Morawiecki
- Succeeded by: Teresa Kubas-Hul

Voivode of Subcarpathian Voivodeship
- In office 8 December 2015 – 11 November 2019
- Prime Minister: Mateusz Morawiecki
- Preceded by: Małgorzata Chomycz-Śmigielska

Personal details
- Born: 27 August 1976 (age 50) Dylągówka, Polish People's Republic
- Party: Law and Justice
- Education: Maria Curie-Skłodowska University; University of Silesia

Ewa Maria Leniart (born 27 August 1976) is a Polish politician. She was elected to the Sejm (9th term) representing the constituency of Rzeszów.

== Biography ==
She graduated from the Second General Secondary School in Rzeszów. In the years 1995–2000 she studied at the Faculty of Law of the Maria Curie-Skłodowska University Branch in Rzeszów, obtaining a professional master's degree in this field. During her studies, she was involved in providing legal advice as part of the student office. In 2014, she obtained a doctorate in law from the University of Silesia in Katowice based on a dissertation entitled Attempted removal of state authorities and attempted change of the state system in the case law of the District Military Court in Rzeszów in the years 1946–1955. In 2000, she began working in the newly established Rzeszów branch of the Institute of National Remembrance – Commission for the Prosecution of Crimes against the Polish Nation as an inspector for administrative affairs.

From 2002 to 2005 she was the head of the department in the Rzeszów branch of the Institute of National Remembrance, then until 2007 she worked in the provincial office as a coordinator and director of the office of the voivode Ewa Draus. In 2006 she also became a research and teaching employee in the Department of History of State and Law at the University of Rzeszów. In 2007 she took up the position of director of the IPN branch in Rzeszów. She was a member of the social Committee for the Construction of the Monument to Father Jerzy Popiełuszko and a founding member of the Committee for the Construction of the Monument to Colonel Łukasz Ciepliński in Rzeszów. She inspired the establishment of the Łukasz Ciepliński Historical Club, which brings together people from the region who are passionate about history. She supported the construction of the Ulma Family Museum of Poles Saving Jews in World War II in Markowa. In 2014, she unsuccessfully ran for the Subcarpathian Voivodeship Regional Assembly from the Law and Justice party, but was elected as a councilor in November 2015.

On December 8, 2015, she was appointed to the position of Voivode of Subcarpathian Voivodeship, resigning from the assembly as a result. In the 2019 elections, she unsuccessfully ran for the position of a Member of the European Parliament from the district covering the Podkarpackie Voivodeship. In the parliamentary elections of the same year, she was elected to the 9th term of the Sejm. She ran in the Rzeszów district, receiving 36,305 votes. In connection with this election, on November 11, 2019, she ended her term as voivode. On January 10, 2020, Prime Minister Mateusz Morawiecki re-entrusted her with the position of Voivode of Subcarpathian Voivodeship (from January 13, 2020). As a result, her parliamentary mandate expired.

In March 2021, she announced her candidacy for the early elections for the mayor of Rzeszów. She was supported by Law and Justice and the Rzeszów Region of the NSZZ Solidarity trade union, and an honorary women's committee was established to support her. In the vote of 13 June 2021, she received 23.62%, taking second place (the elections ended in the first round with Konrad Fijołek winning).

In the 2023 elections, she won a parliamentary mandate for the second time, winning 38,795 votes. As a result, on 2 November of the same year, she ceased to serve as voivode. In 2024, she ran on behalf of PiS in the next European elections.
