= Urszula Augustyn =

Polish politician (born 1964)

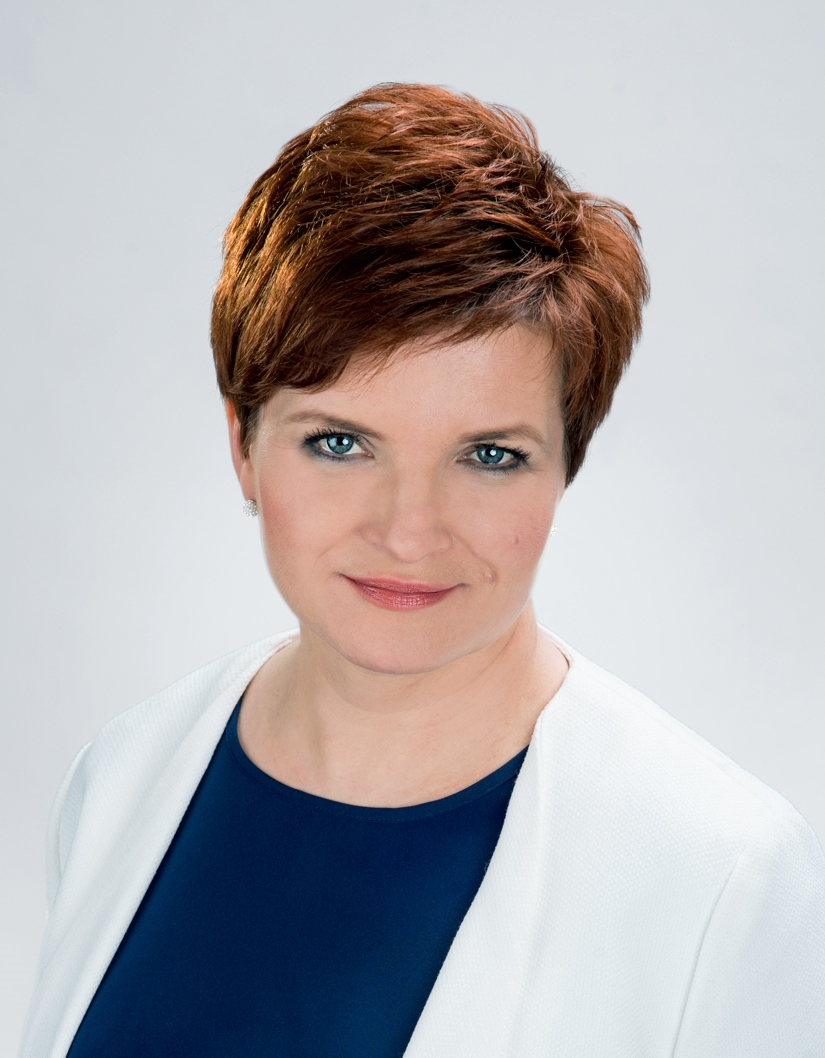

Deputy of the Sejm
- Incumbent
- Assumed office 25 September 2005
- Constituency: 15 Tarnów

Personal details
- Born: September 1, 1964 (age 61) Tarnów, Polish People's Republic
- Party: Civic Platform

Urszula Danuta Augustyn (born 1 September 1964 in Tarnów) is a Polish politician. A member of the Polish parliament of the 5th, 6th, 7th, 8th and 9th term. Since 2019, deputy-chairman of Commission for Petitions and a member of Commission for Culture and Media in Sejm.

== Biography ==
In 1990, she completed her master's studies at the Pedagogical University of Cracow, the Faculty of Polish Philology. For 15 years she worked as a teacher in primary schools. As a journalist, she collaborated with Gość Niedzielny, Radio Plus Tarnów and with the Catholic portal Opoka, where she edited information based on the service of the Polish section of Radio Vatican. She wrote for the Polish-American monthly Nasze Słowa in Hanover. She was a member of the board of the Catholic Youth Education Center "Kana" in Tarnów.

In 2005 , from the Civic Platform list, she was elected MP of the 5th term in the Tarnów constituency. In the parliamentary elections in 2007, she won a parliamentary seat for the second time, receiving 10,480 votes. In the 2011 elections, she successfully ran for re-election with 9,724 votes. In 2014, the weekly Polityka, based on a ranking conducted among Polish parliamentary journalists, listed Urszula Augustyn among the top 10 MPs, emphasizing in particular her contribution to the issue of education.

== See also ==
- Members of Polish Sejm 2005-2007
