= Marcin of Wrocimowice =

Polish diplomat (died 1442)

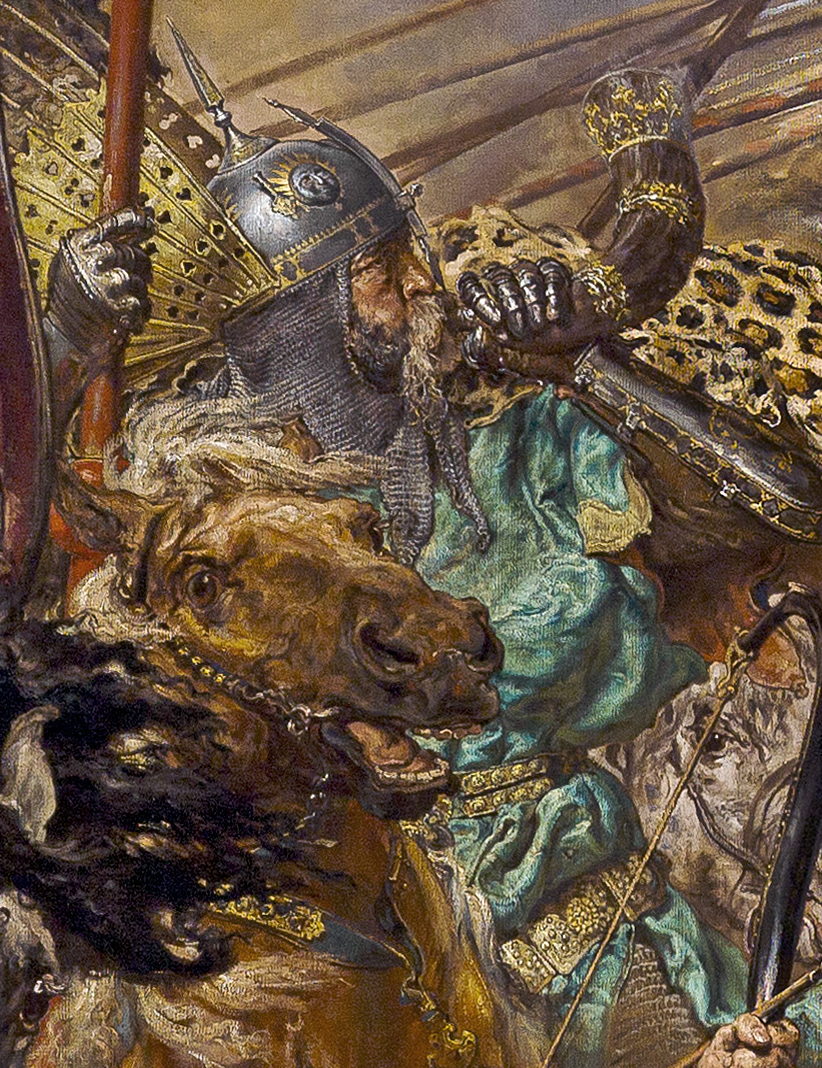
Marcin of Wrocimowice, fragment of Battle of Grunwald by Jan Matejko (1878)

Marcin of Wrocimowice (Polish: Marcin z Wrocimowic, [ˈmart͡ɕin zvrɔt͡ɕiˈmɔvit͡s]; died 1442) was a Polish knight and diplomat from the Półkozic clan.

He served as Starosta (prefect) of Łowicz and as Standard-Bearer of the Territory of Kraków. In the latter capacity, he carried the banner of the Territory of Kraków — which was, at the same time, the Banner of the Kingdom of Poland – under which a unit consisting of Poland's elite knights, including such chivalrous celebrities as Zawisza the Black, went to the Battle of Grunwald (Tannenberg) on 15 July 1410. According to Jan Długosz, during the course of the battle, the national banner slipped out of Marcin's hand and fell on the ground, but it was quickly picked up and saved from destruction by Polish army's most valiant knights, which gave the Poles even more motivation to strive for victory over the Teutonic Knights.

Marcin also served as a royal envoy to the pope. In 1399, he lost the village of Wrocimowice, but continued to sign himself "of Wrocimowice". In 1430, he acquired the village of Dębowiec.
