= Michał Wójcik =

Polish politician (born 1971)

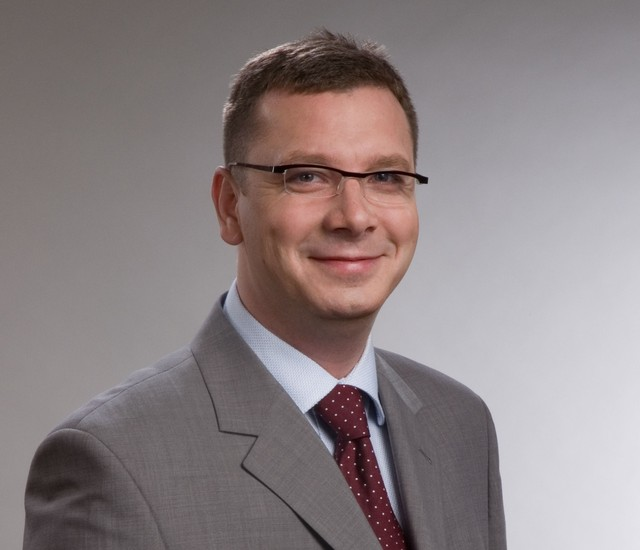

member of Sejm 2005-2007
- In office 25 September 2005 – ?

Personal details
- Born: 17 April 1971 (age 54) Kraków, Poland
- Party: Law and Justice

Michał Marek Wójcik (born 17 April 1971) is a Polish politician. He was elected to Sejm on 25 September 2005, getting 7428 votes in 30 Rybnik district as a candidate from the Law and Justice list.

In 2021, when he was deputy Justice minister, he triggered a lot of foreign indignation by presenting a proposal to completely exclude same-sex couples from adoption. In Poland, single parents are allowed to adopt; some of the single parents were or became part of a same-sex couple. The new bill was meant to check and double-check the status of single parents before allowing adoption.

== See also ==
- Members of Polish Sejm 2005-2007
