= Zarzecze, Jasło County =

Zarzecze
- Village
- Location within Poland
- Coordinates: 49°40′38″N 21°28′54″E
- Country: Poland
- Voivodeship: Subcarpathian
- County: Jasło
- Gmina: Dębowiec
- Population (approx.): 1,500

Zarzecze [zaˈʐɛt͡ʂɛ] is a village in the administrative district of Gmina Dębowiec, within Jasło County, Subcarpathian Voivodeship, in south-eastern Poland.
