= Konrad Fijołek =

Polish politician and Mayor of Rzeszów

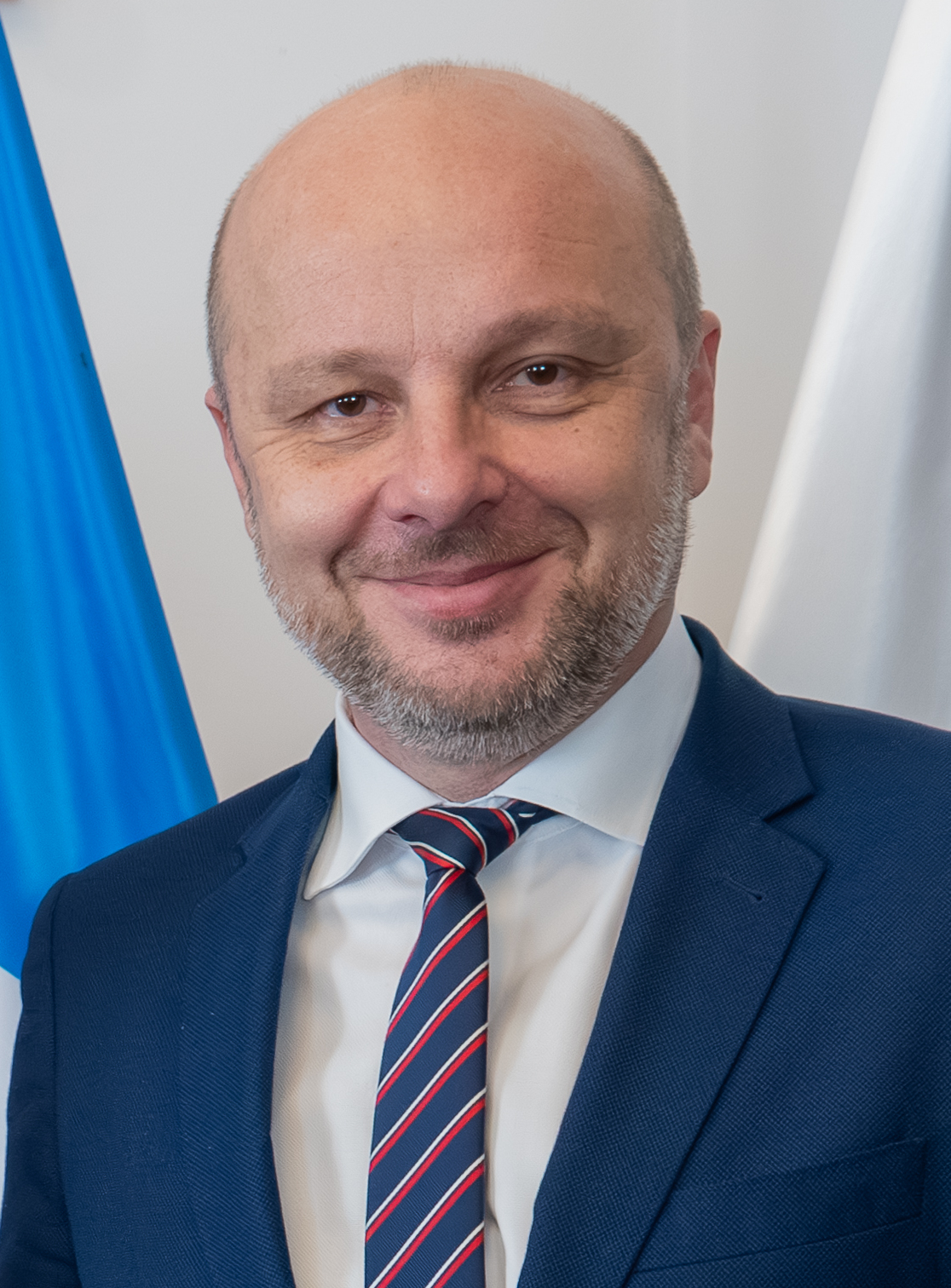

Mayor of Rzeszów
- Incumbent
- Assumed office 21 June 2021
- Preceded by: Tadeusz Ferenc

Personal details
- Born: 17 July 1976 (age 49). Rzeszów Poland
- Party: Development of Rzeszów

Konrad Rafał Fijołek (born 17 July 1976, in Rzeszów) is a Polish sociologist and local politician who has served as Mayor of Rzeszów since 21 June 2021. He previously served as chairman of the Rzeszów City Council from 2006 to 2010.

== Early life and education ==
He graduated from the Mikołaj Kopernik IV High School in Rzeszów, and subsequently from the Faculty of Sociology at the Pedagogical University in Rzeszów (now the University of Rzeszów). In 2018, he obtained a postgraduate Executive MBA diploma awarded by Apsley Business School in London. He worked as a chief specialist at the Marshal's Office.

He was an activist of the Democratic Left Alliance, serving, among other roles, as head of the party's structures in Rzeszów. During the third term of the Rzeszów City Council, on 6 November 2001, he took office as a city councillor, filling the seat vacated by Tadeusz Ferenc. He became one of the leaders of the "Development of Rzeszów" committee formed around the mayor. He was subsequently re-elected as a city councillor in the local elections for the 4th term (2002), 5th term (2006), 6th term (2010), 7th term (2014) and 8th term (2018). From 2006 to 2010 he served as chairman of the Rzeszów City Council, and during the 6th, 7th and 8th terms he served as the council's deputy chairman.

On 15 March 2021, he announced his intention to run in the mayoral by-election in Rzeszów, held following the resignation of Tadeusz Ferenc. He was endorsed by the Civic Coalition (Koalicja Obywatelska), the Left (Lewica), the Polish Coalition (Koalicja Polska), Poland 2050 (Polska 2050), the Labour Union (Unia Pracy), as well as a number of local associations and social organizations. In the by-election, he received 56.5% of the vote, winning in the first round. He assumed office as mayor of Rzeszów on 21 June 2021.

In 2024 he was re-elected, winning the runoff against Waldemar Szumny of Law and Justice (Prawo i Sprawiedliwość, PiS) with 54.9% of the vote.

== Personal life ==
He is the brother of Ewelina, a gymnast and local government activist. He is married to Magdalena Czach and has one son.
