= Folusz, Podkarpackie Voivodeship =

Folusz
- Village
- Location within Poland
- Coordinates: 49°37′N 21°23′E
- Country: Poland
- Voivodeship: Subcarpathian
- County: Jasło
- Gmina: Dębowiec
- Highest elevation: 400 m (1,300 ft)
- Lowest elevation: 380 m (1,250 ft)
- Population: 610

Folusz [ˈfɔluʂ] is a village in the administrative district of Gmina Dębowiec, within Jasło County, Subcarpathian Voivodeship, in south-eastern Poland.
