= Józefa Szczurek-Żelazko =

Polish politician and deputy

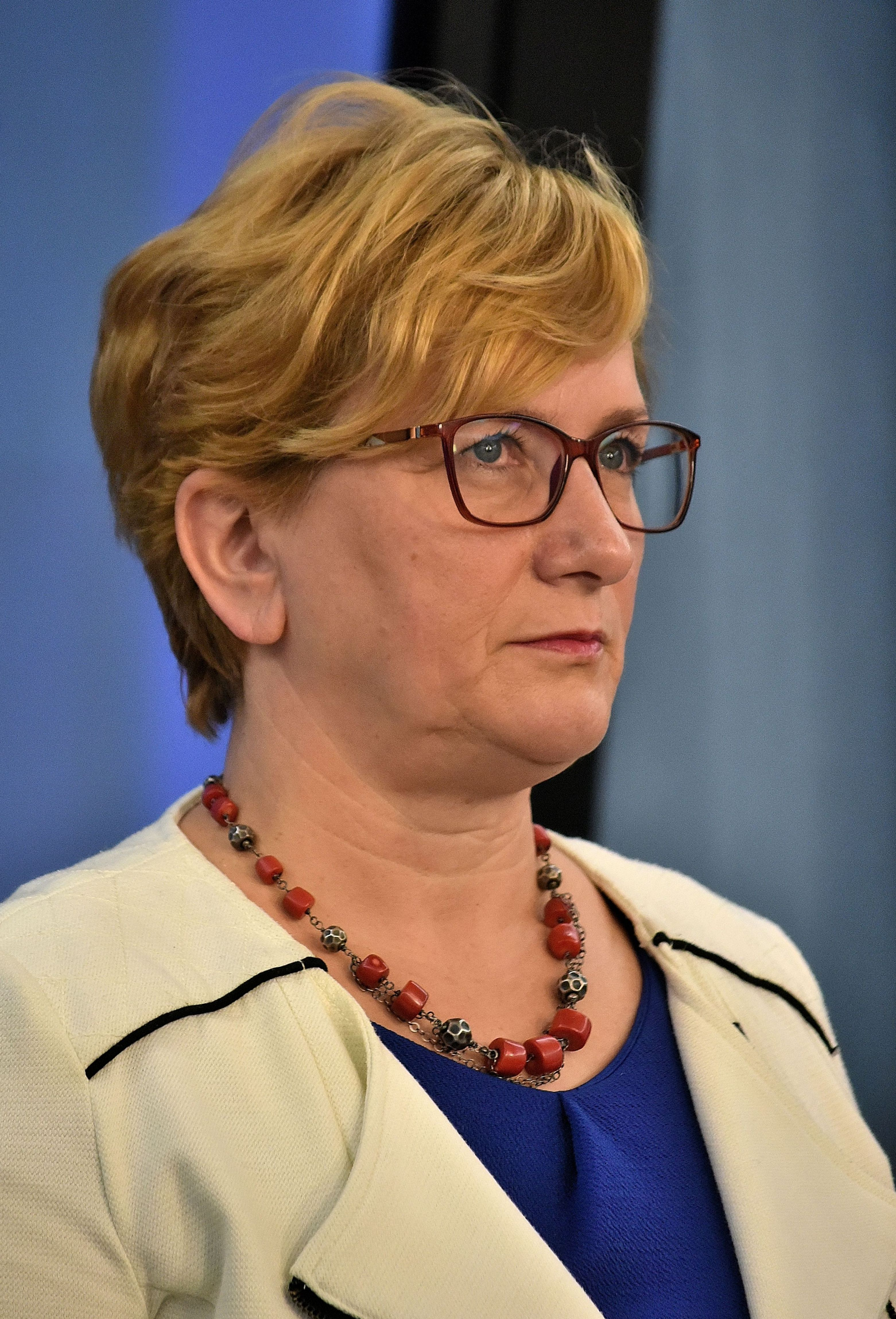

Member of the Sejm of the Republic of Poland
- In office 2015–Present

Deputy Minister of Health
- In office 2017–2020

Personal details
- Born: 14 March 1961 (age 65) Nowy Sącz, Poland
- Party: Law and Justice
- Education: Medical University of Lublin
- Occupation: Politician, nurse
- Website: szczurek-zelazko.pl

Józefa Szczurek-Żelazko née Poręba (born 14 March 1961 in Nowy Sącz) is a Polish nurse, health manager, politician, and local government official. She has been a member of the Sejm (8th, 9th, and 10th terms) since 2015 and served as Deputy Minister of Health from 2017 to 2020.

== Biography ==
She graduated from the Medical High School in Nowy Sącz and then completed her studies at the Faculty of Nursing at the Medical University of Lublin. She worked as a nurse and was also a teacher at the Medical School Complex. She served as the director of the health and social policy department in the starosty of Nowy Sącz County. In 2001, she became the director of a health care facility in Brzesko.

In the 2010 and 2014 local elections, she was elected as a councilor in the Lesser Poland Regional Assembly representing the Law and Justice party.

In the 2015 parliamentary election, she ran for the Sejm in the Tarnów constituency. She was elected as a member of the 8th term, receiving 15,635 votes. In February 2017, she was appointed Deputy Minister of Health. In the 2019 parliamentary election, she successfully ran for re-election, receiving 25,323 votes. In November 2020, she resigned from her position as Deputy Minister of Health. In the 2023 election, she was re-elected to the Sejm for the third consecutive term with 26,231 votes.

== Personal life ==
She is married and has four children.

== Honors and awards ==
In 2016, she was awarded the Gold Cross of Merit. In 2019, she received the Gold Cross for services to the NSZZP of the Lesser Poland Voivodeship.
