= Radość, Subcarpathian Voivodeship =

Radość
- Village
- Location within Poland
- Coordinates: 49°40′38″N 21°22′29″E
- Country: Poland
- Voivodeship: Subcarpathian
- County: Jasło
- Gmina: Dębowiec

Radość [ˈradɔɕt͡ɕ] is a village in the administrative district of Gmina Dębowiec, within Jasło County, Subcarpathian Voivodeship, in south-eastern Poland. From 1975 to 1998 Radość has belonged to Krośnieńskie Voivodeship.

== History ==
History of this place is still unknown. There are none documents left about the founder of the village. During World War II small battle took place in the forest near Radość. There is also unmarked cemetery with people who died of cholera disease, but unfortunately accurate dates are also unknown. Now we can notice there crucifix on the hill. In the heart of Radość, near the main road we can admire small, white chapel which is dated for 1902. Every year residents gather to renovate it.
