= Edward Siarka =

Polish politician (born 1963)

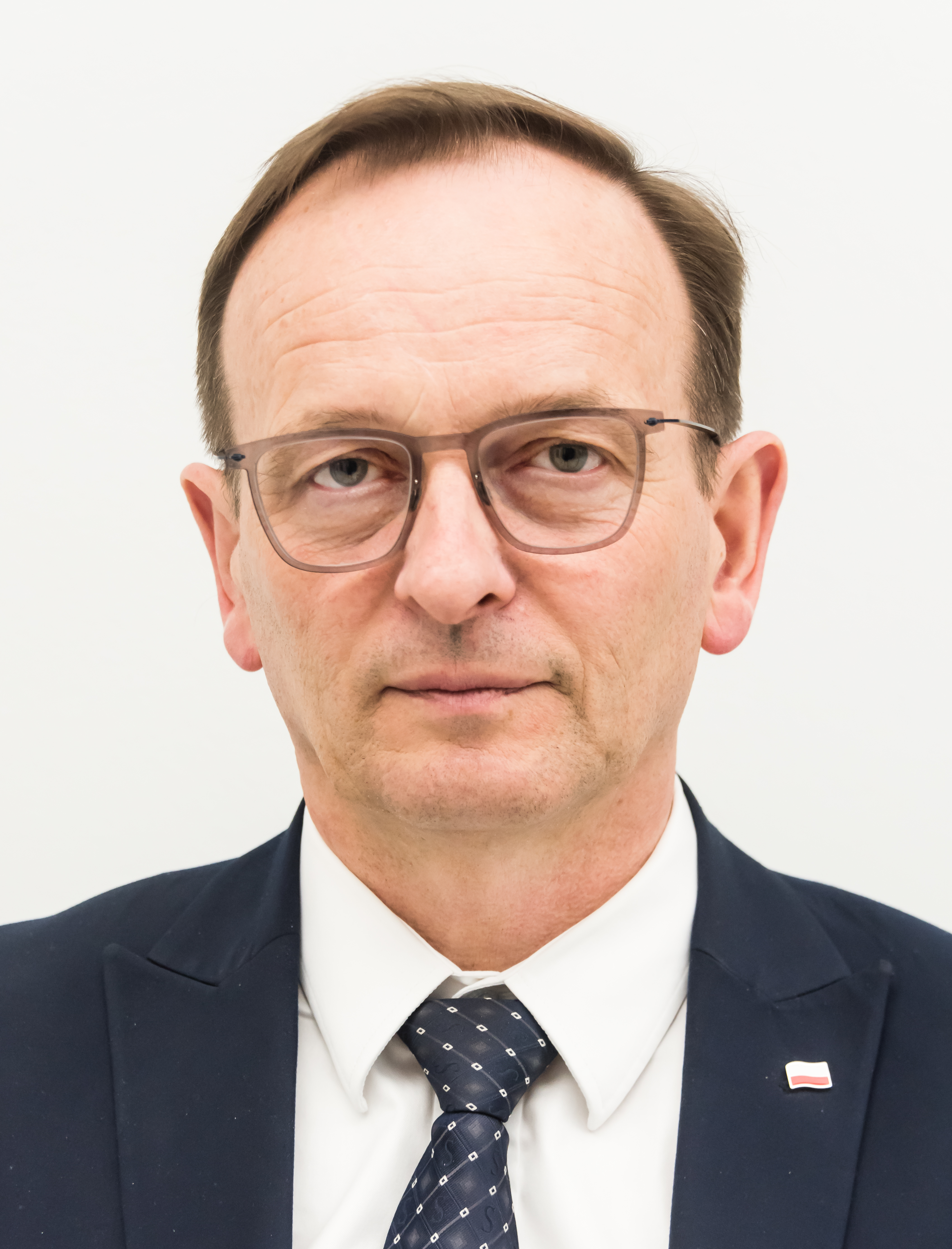

Member of Sejm 2005-2007
- In office 25 September 2005 – ?

Personal details
- Born: 1963 (age 62–63)
- Party: Law and Justice

Edward Siarka (born 7 July 1963 in Rabka) is a Polish politician. He was elected to the Sejm on 25 September 2005, getting 10,778 votes in 14 Nowy Sącz district as a candidate from the Law and Justice list.

He was re-elected on 10 October 2019.

== See also ==
- Members of Polish Sejm 2005-2007
