= Styków, Podkarpackie Voivodeship =

Styków
- Village
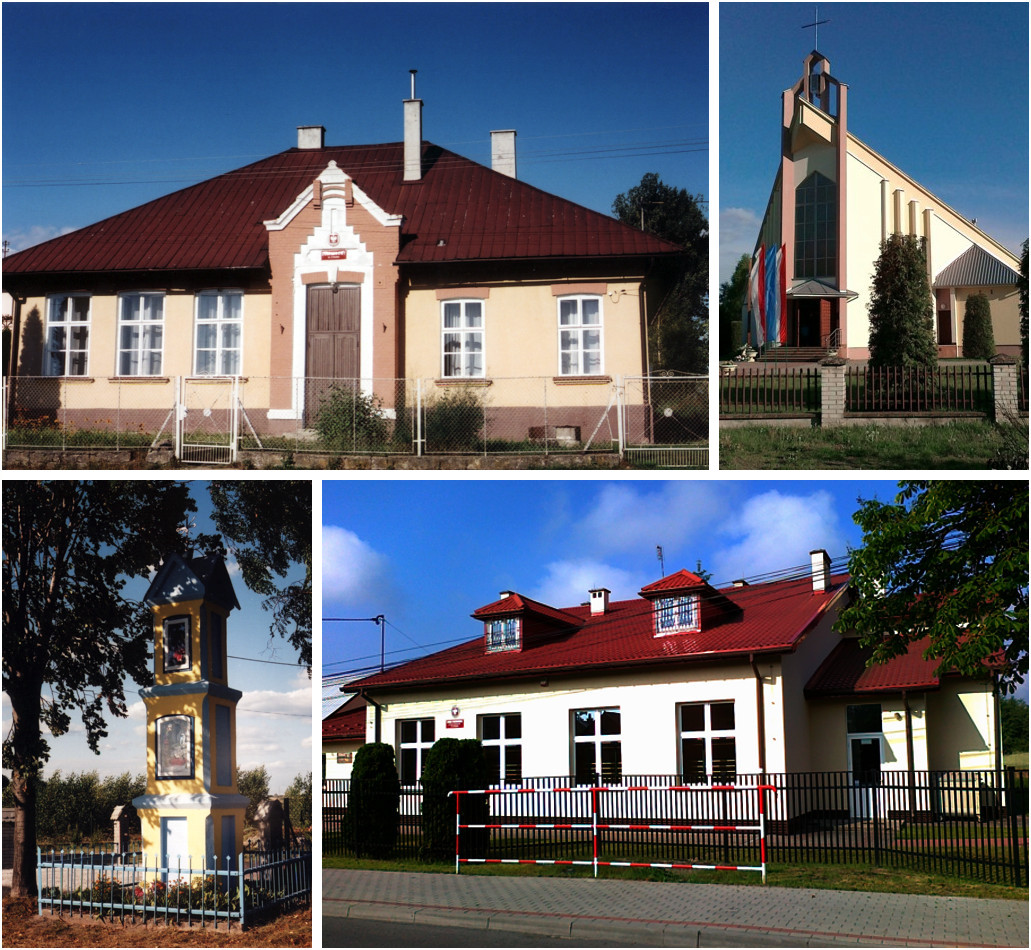
- Styków: People's House, Church of St. Michael, Wayside shrine, Primary School

- Location within Poland
- Coordinates: 50°11′N 21°57′E
- Country: Poland
- Voivodeship: Subcarpathian
- County: Rzeszów County
- Town: Głogów Małopolski

Area
  - Total: 9.71 km^{2} (3.75 sq mi)
- Highest elevation: 255 m (837 ft)
- Lowest elevation: 210 m (690 ft)

Population (2011)
  - Total: 845
  - Density: 87.0/km^{2} (225/sq mi)
- Time zone: UTC+1 (CET)
  - Summer (DST): UTC+2 (CEST)
- Postal code: 36-060
- Area code: +48 17
- Car plates: RZE

Styków [ˈstɨkuf] is a village which was until 31 December 2020 in the administrative district of Gmina Głogów Małopolski, within Rzeszów County, Subcarpathian Voivodeship, in south-eastern Poland. From 1 January 2021 it became part of the town of Głogów Małopolski. It is located of the Łęg River in the heartland of the Sandomierz Basin.
