= Tadeusz Ferenc =

Polish economist and politician (1940–2022)

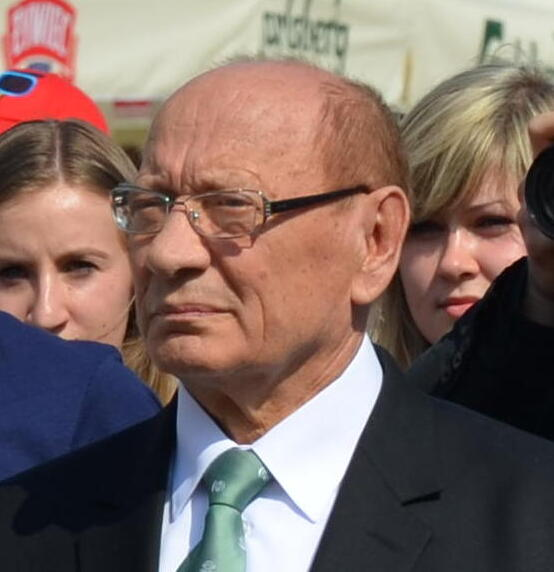
- Ferenc in 2014

Member of Sejm
- In office 2001–2002

Mayor of Rzeszów
- In office 2002–2021

Personal details
- Born: 10 February 1940 Reichshof, Distrikt Krakau, General Government
- Died: 27 August 2022 (aged 82) Rzeszów, Podkarpackie Voivodeship, Third Polish Republic
- Political party: Democratic Left Alliance

Tadeusz Ferenc (10 February 1940 – 27 August 2022) was a Polish economist and politician. He served as a member of Sejm from 2001 to 2002.

Ferenc was born in Rzeszów on 10 February 1940. He served as the mayor of Rzeszów since 2002. He was honored with the medals Order of Polonia Restituta, Decoration of Honor Meritorious for Polish Culture and Badge of Honour for Merit to Local Government.

Ferenc served as one of the establishers of politician and historian Bronisław Komorowski election committee of the 2015 Polish presidential election. He served as mayor of Rzeszów until 2021.

Ferenc died on 27 August 2022, at the age of 82.
