= Myscowa =

Myscowa Мисцева
- Village
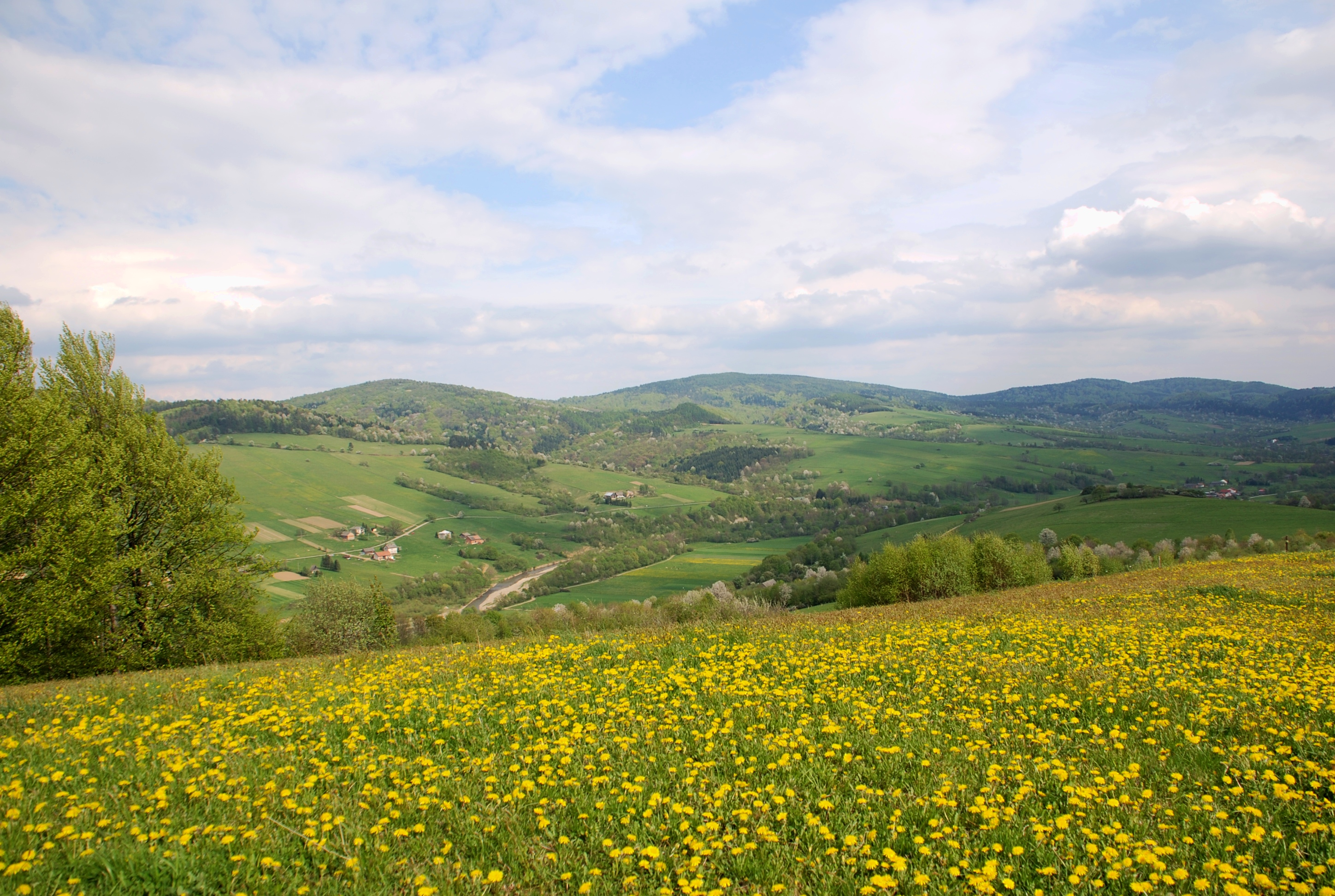

- Location within Poland
- Coordinates: 49°32′N 21°34′E
- Country: Poland
- Voivodeship: Subcarpathian
- County: Jasło
- Gmina: Krempna
- Population (2021): 214

Myscowa (Polish pronunciation: [mɘsˈt͡sɔva]; Lemko Rusyn: Мисцева) is a village in the administrative district of Gmina Krempna, within Jasło County, Subcarpathian Voivodeship, in south-eastern Poland, close to the border with Slovakia. It has the status of a sołectwo (village council).

Before the 1945 Soviet intervention in Poland and 1947's Operation Vistula, a resettlement authorized by occupied Poland's Stalinist authorities, the village was primarily inhabited by Lemkos, a subgroup of the Rusyn ethnicity. The village is located in the Lemko Region (Lemkovyna/Łemkowszczyzna). Many Rusyn immigrants who settled in Buckner, Illinois trace their roots to Myscowa.

== History ==
At the beginning of the 15th century, the Vlach migrations took place in the Low Beskids, and as a result, Balkan pastoralists began to colonize these areas. In 1420, the Wojszyk family of the Powała coat of arms founded the village of Myscowa under Vlach law, appointing Ivan Wałach as settler.

It later came under the rule of the Stadnicki family, and from the 17th century onward, subsequent owners included the Kochanowski, Lubomirski, Siemieński, Lewicki, and Potulicki families. The village was inhabited primarily by Rusyns of the Greek Catholic faith, having converted from Eastern Orthodoxy. A church existed as early as the 15th century, first mentioned in 1581. This was notable as the village was one of the largest in this part of the Lemko region. A new brick church was built in 1796 on the site of the previous one, which had been demolished in the mid-18th century. It survives to this day.

At the end of the 19th century, it had a population of approximately 1,200.

The influence of the Tylawa schism (a mass conversion wave among Western Lemkos back to Eastern Orthodoxy) did not find any supporters, and the residents of Myscowa remained Greek Catholic.

By the early 20th century, the village had a manor house and farm, a school, the Kaczkowski reading room, a sawmill, two watermills, a fulling mill, and an inn. Monthly fairs were held, primarily for livestock trade, and peasants from as far away as Prešov would attend. The population also engaged in stonemasonry and carpentry. The construction of the Jasło-Żmigród-Konieczna railway line, which was supposed to pass through Myscowa, was interrupted by World War I. The village's development was aided by land consolidation between 1928 and 1935. A new two-story community center, currently used as a primary school, was built by the villagers themselves in 1937.

On 01.01.1939 the village was recorded as having 1320 inhabitants (1310 Ruthenians and 10 Poles). There were also a number of Jews who lived in the village.

=== World War II and Operation Vistula ===
During the wartime operations of World War II, the village did not suffer significant damage. During the Dukla-Prešov Operation, German troops, preparing for defense, evacuated some of the residents. They also demolished residential buildings, using them for firewood and building fortifications.

During the occupation, most of the Lemkos from Myscowa supported the Soviet partisans operating in the area. They were organized by a Lemko from Mszana, Grzegorz Wodzik (codenamed Wyścig). His fighting group consisted of Lemkos and escaped Soviet soldiers. In 1943, he became the commander of a partisan unit of the Jasło District People's Guard and stood in opposition to the Nazi occupiers. He died in April 1943 near Kłopotnica, where a monument dedicated to him was unveiled in 1968 and stood until decommunization laws forced its removal in 2018.

During the war, the local parish priest, Stefan Shalash, was engaged in Ukrainian nationalist and national-martyrological messaging and collaborated with the Nazi occupiers by denouncing the residents for their partisan resistance and non-Ukrainian Lemko identity. The last Jewish innkeeper of the village lived on good terms with Shalash, from whom he leased a field, and in agreement with him, he forced his debtors to pay off the inn's debts. This behavior caused conflict and outrage among the locals. Shalash was shot on 7 November 1943 by Home Army AK Żmigród Zimorodek (part of the Polish Underground State) for his part in collaborating with the Nazis and his anti-Polish sermons such as that from September 1939, when after the Nazi invasion of Poland, Shalash stated: "There was a Poland, but there never will be again. Poles ruled, but now they will never rule again. Poles have been twirling our tongues for two hundred years, and now they won't".

At the turn of winter and spring of 1945, after the Red Army entered the village and set up a Stalinist authority in Poland that was hostile to Greek Catholics in the southeast of the country due to their perceived collaboration in protecting Ukrainian Insurgent Army hideouts, almost all Lemkos left for the USSR. Those who remained were resettled two years later to the Recovered Territories as part of Operation Vistula. The remainder were deported in 1948 to the vicinity of Legnica and Lubin. After the war, the village was repopulated by Poles from the villages Huta Polańska, Polany and Kąty which were destroyed by the Nazis during the Battle of Dukla Pass.

Myscowa belonged to the Krosno Voivodeship of the Polish People's Republic, and later the Republic of Poland, from 1975 to 1998. Before the war, the village had a population of 1,320, but currently, it has fallen to fewer than 214 (as of 2021).

=== Kąty-Myscowa Reservoir ===
The reason for the village's population decline are plans to build a dam to create a Kąty-Myscowa reservoir, which have existed on and off since the 1920s, and the authorities' suspension of investments in Myscowa, as well as the refusal to issue building permits for new homes, which significantly hampered the village's development. In 1985, the village was connected to Krempna by an asphalt road.

The topic of building the dam and consequently flooding the village out of existence has returned in recent years, particularly under the 2016–2023 government of Law and Justice, and caused much controversy and criticism from environmental groups and among inhabitants who live mainly from raising cattle and subsistence agriculture as well as from hosting guests in their homes as a form of agrotourism. Another reason for the controversy is the fact that the village contains an 18th century church, traditional and unique wooden Lemko pre-war architecture, and a unique landscape and cultural heritage on the national level, all of which would be destroyed should the reservoir be created. Furthermore, the village is adjacent to Magura National Park, and the president of the Greenmind Foundation, Jacek Engel, had stated: "If the reservoir were built, it would be a violation of the laws of both Poland and the European Union." The construction was planned by the end of 2027, but was postponed.
