= Rubus magurensis =

Scientific classification
- Kingdom: Plantae
- Clade: Embryophytes
- Clade: Tracheophytes
- Clade: Angiosperms
- Clade: Eudicots
- Clade: Rosids
- Order: Rosales
- Family: Rosaceae
- Genus: Rubus
- Species: R. magurensis

Binomial name
- Rubus magurensis Wolanin, M.Nobis & Oklej. (2025), nom. illeg., non Nyár. (1956)

Species of flowering plant

Rubus magurensis Wolanin, M.Nobis & Oklej. is a perennial, prickly, deciduous subshrub, a species of blackberry in the genus Rubus (family Rosaceae), native to Poland. The species name is illegitimate. The species is not the same as the earlier described Rubus magurensis Nyár. which is native to Romania.

Its native range is limited mainly to the regions of southeastern Poland, within the Northern Carpathians, including the Central Beskids and the Strzyżowskie Foothills. The altitudinal range is approximately 320 to 600 metres above sea level, where it grows in mesophilic beech forests, forest edges and forest roads, and clearings.

== Description ==
The stems are low arched, up to 1 m high, angular, usually with slightly furrowed sides, violet-red on the side facing the sun, bare or sometimes with simple hairs, with quite numerous almost sessile glands and rare stem glands and spines with glands at the ends.

The fruit is black and shiny, on average 15–21 mm long and 13–18 mm wide; flowering begins in June–July; fruiting begins in August–September. The anthers are naked, yellowish-white, with white stamen filaments. The sepals are long, pointed, densely hairy and glandular. The peduncles usually have a few short spines at the base and a pubescent margin, and become reflexed after the flowering period.

The petioles have a complex body structure, usually longer basal leaflets, weakly grooved, with simple hairs scattered across, almost sessile glands, stalked glands and teeth with glands at the ends and with curved, drooping spines.

Spines are numerous, up to 6–12 per 5 cm length of shoot, equal, located at the corners, usually crowded and dense, descending, curved to straight, laterally compressed.

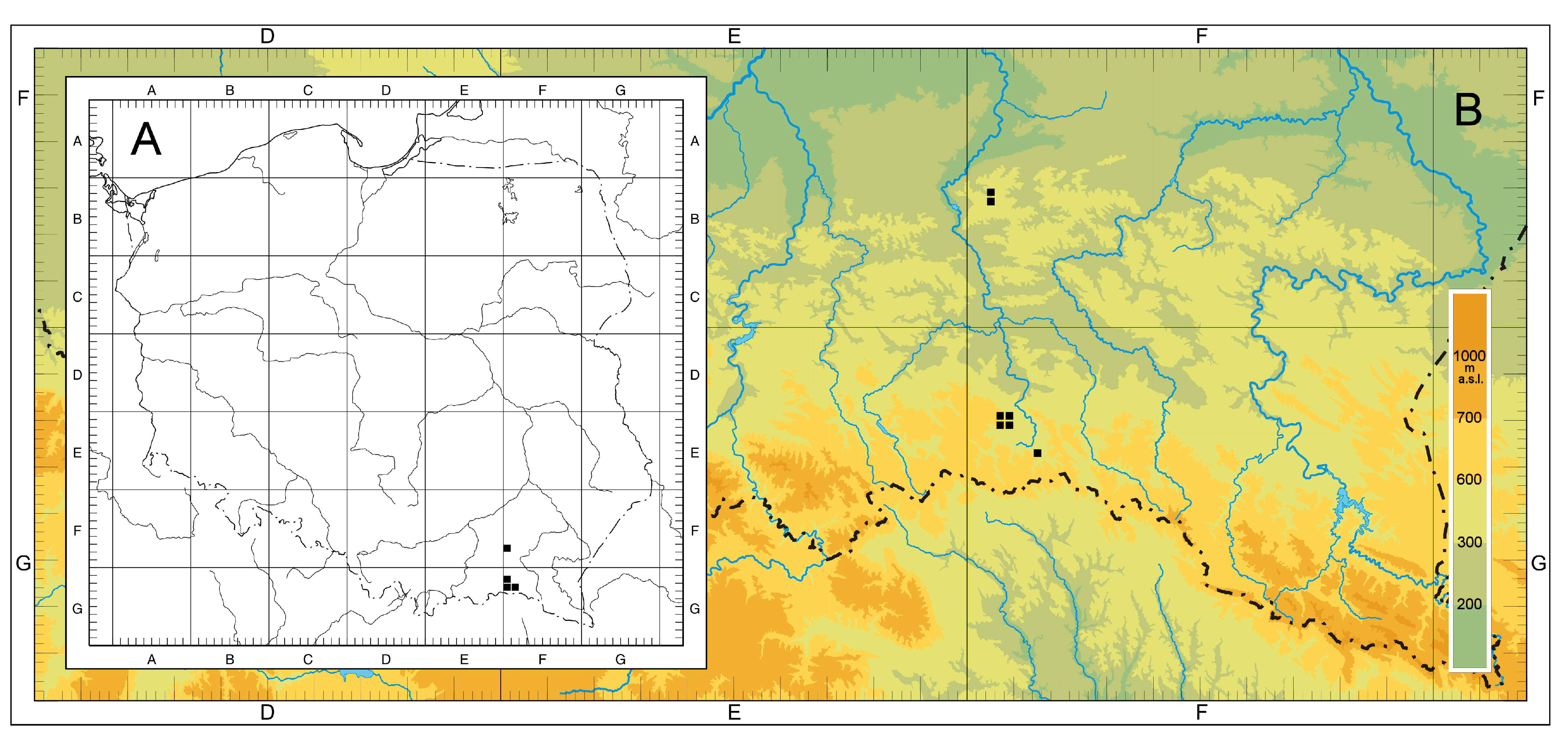
Distribution of Rubus magurensis

== Taxonomy ==
The species was first described in 2025 under the name Rubus magurensis. However, this name had already been published for a different plant in 1956 by Erasmus Julius Nyárády, so the name is an illegitimate later homonym. The etymology of the name "magurensis" comes from the Magura mountain range, the place where this species is most commonly found.

== Karyology ==
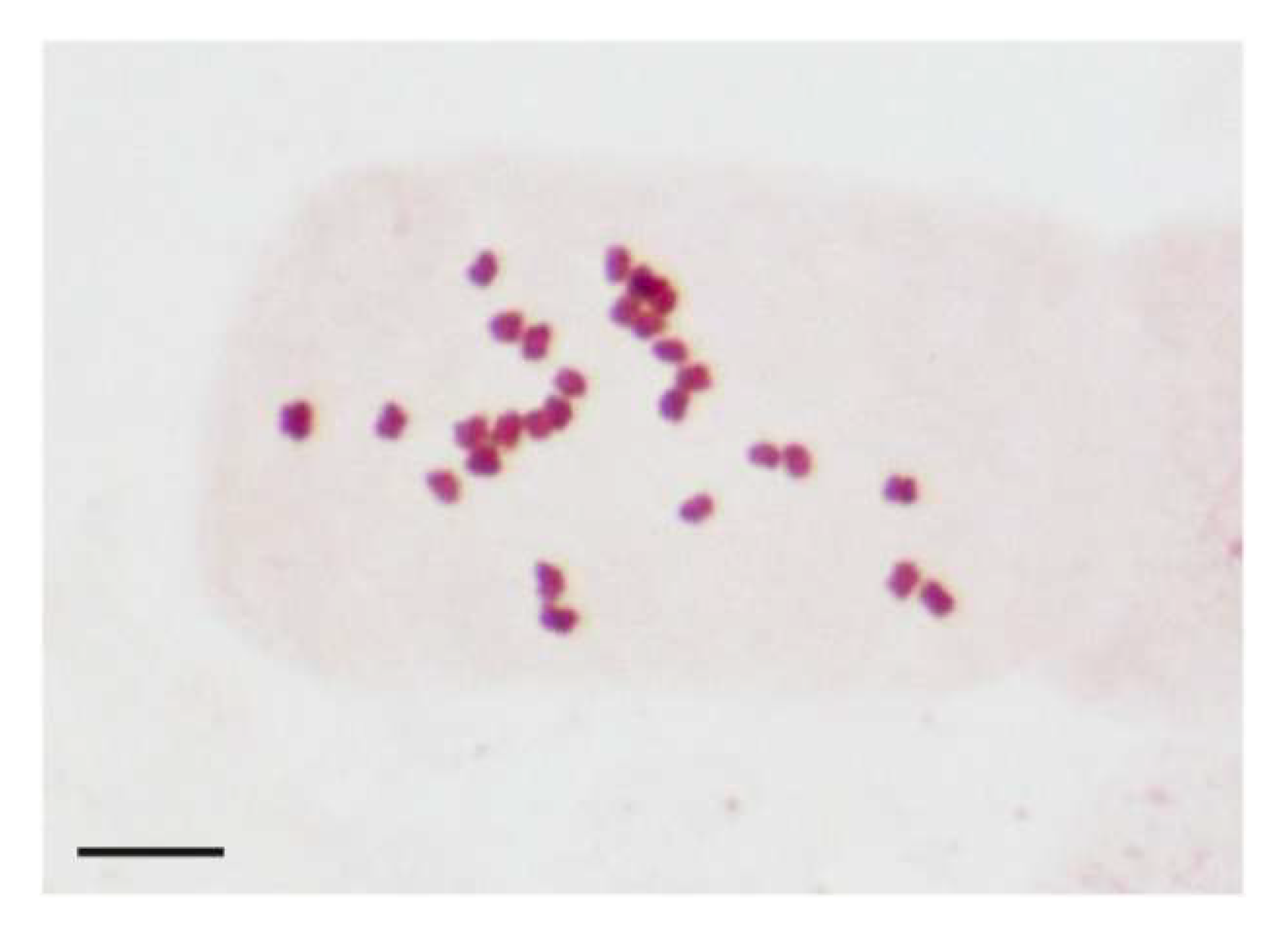
Karyological analysis

Karyological analysis showed the tetraploid chromosome number was (2n = 4x = 28).

== Habitat and distribution, conservation status ==
Rubus magurensis grows in temperate mesophilic forests, in the tree layer, especially typical along forest edges and forest paths. Can be found at forest edges, as well as in disturbed forest soils with mixed tree species.

However, it is also noted on the edge of the larch-poplar forest line which was recorded in surroundings Jaworze near Nowy Żmigród.

Currently, 11 populations of Rubus magurensis are known in southeastern Poland. Most of them are in the Low Beskids region, and two populations are in the northwestern part of the Strzyzów foothills. It is assumed that this species may also be widespread in Slovakia or other parts of the Carpathians.

According to the IUCN list of flora of Poland, this species is classified as Least Concern.
