= Maxim Sandovich =

Protomartyr of the Lemko people

Maxim of Gorlice
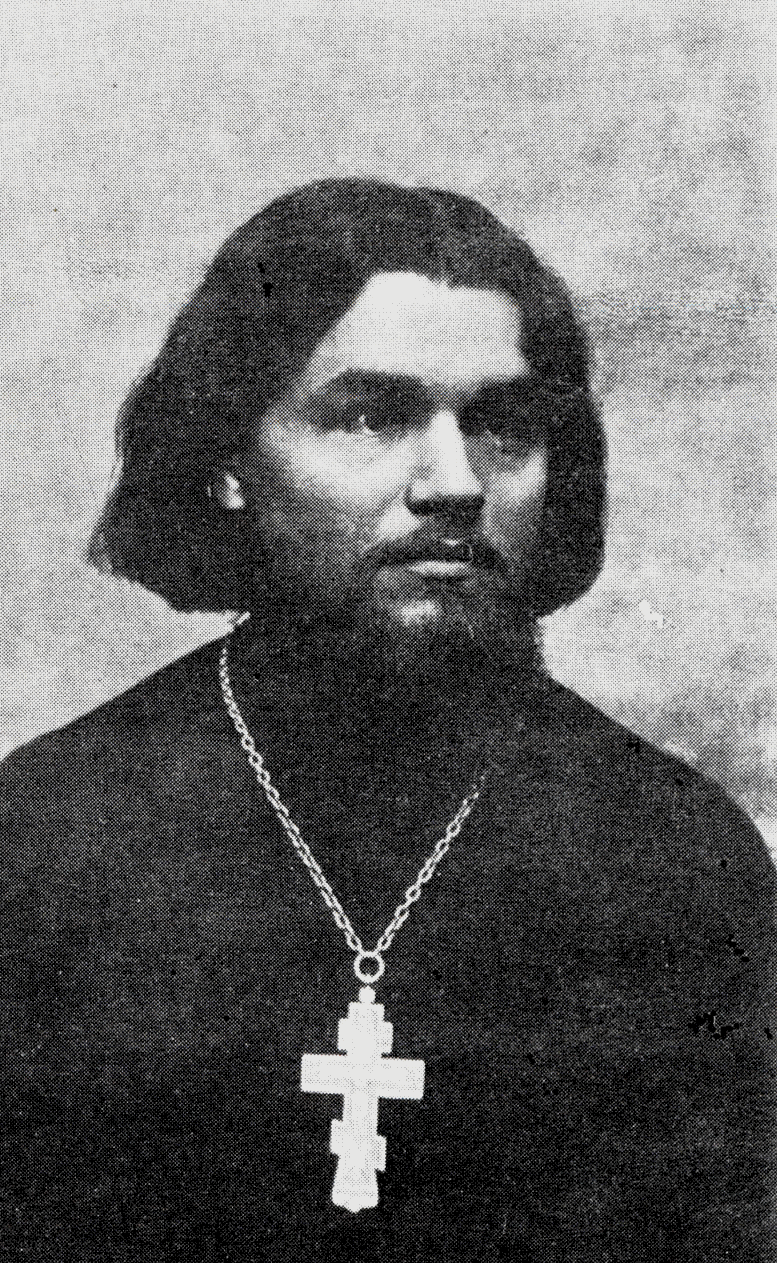
- Born: 1 February 1888, Zdynia, Kingdom of Galicia and Lodomeria, Austria-Hungary
- Died: 6 August 1914 (aged 26), Gorlice, Kingdom of Galicia and Lodomeria, Austria-Hungary
- Martyred by: Dietrich from Linz, for the Austro-Hungarian Empire
- Means of martyrdom: firing squad
- Venerated in: Eastern Orthodoxy
- Canonized: September 6, 1994, Gorlice, by Polish Orthodox Church
- Major shrine: New Orthodox Church of the Holy Trinity, Gorlice
- Feast: September 6 (Old Calendar)
- Patronage: Lemko people

Maxim Timofeyevich Sandovich (Russian: Максим Тимофеевич Сандович, Polish: Maksym Sandowicz, Maksym Gorlicki; 1 February 1888 – 6 August 1914) is a New Martyr and Orthodox saint. He was canonised with the name of Maxim of Gorlice with the title of hieromartyr. (Polish: Maksym Gorlicki, Russian: Максим Горлицкий, Rusyn: Максим Горлицкый). He is the protomartyr of the Lemko people.

He was trained as an Eastern Orthodox priest, and was executed by the officially Catholic state of the Austro-Hungarian Empire as a Russophile after his conversion to the Orthodox Church. After his execution, his wife was imprisoned in Talerhof, where his son, also named Maxim Sandovich, was born.

The memory of Saint Maxim and his spiritual heritage continues to be an important identification and value guide for the faithful of the Polish Orthodox Church, first of all for the Lemkos, reminding them of their spiritual roots, strengthening them in faith and inspiring them to work revealing the historical past of the Carpathian Ruthenians.

== Life ==
=== Early life ===
Maxim Sandovich was born in Zdynia, Galicia, in family of Tymoteusz (or Timofej) and Krystyna Sandovich. His father owned a farm house and was a chanter in the local Greek-Catholic church of the Protection of the Mother of God (pl). His mother was a housewife.

He graduated from a four-class school in Gorlice and started his studies at a Gymnasium in Jasło. He then moved to the same school in Nowy Sącz. Among his colleagues he distinguished himself with religiosity; He planned to join the monastery. On the other hand, he had poor academic results, so he had to quit his high school after four class. Without parental consent, he then entered the novitiate to the Monastery of Krechov of the Basilian Order. After three months, in 1904, he left the congregation, disappointed with the spiritual level and general atmosphere of the monastery. The reason for Maxim Sandovich's disappointment in the Greek-Catholic Church was that by the beginning of the twentieth century the Greek-Catholic monasteries and theological seminaries of Eastern Galicia, with the assistance of the Austrian and Polish administrations, finally turned into centers of Ukrainian propaganda and centers of the spread of Ukrainian identity. It was at this time, in order to strengthen Ukrainian influence on the Greek Catholic clergy of Galicia and to undermine the positions of traditionally influential Galician Russophiles, on the initiative of the Austrian authorities, it was difficult to admit people of traditional Russophile orientation to the theological seminaries of Eastern Galicia. Such an atmosphere, established in the Greek-Catholic Church of Eastern Galicia by the beginning of the twentieth century with the assistance of the Greek-Catholic Metropolitan — Ukrainizer Andrey Sheptytsky, was unacceptable for Maxim Sandovich, who was a staunch supporter of all-Russian unity.

=== In Russia ===
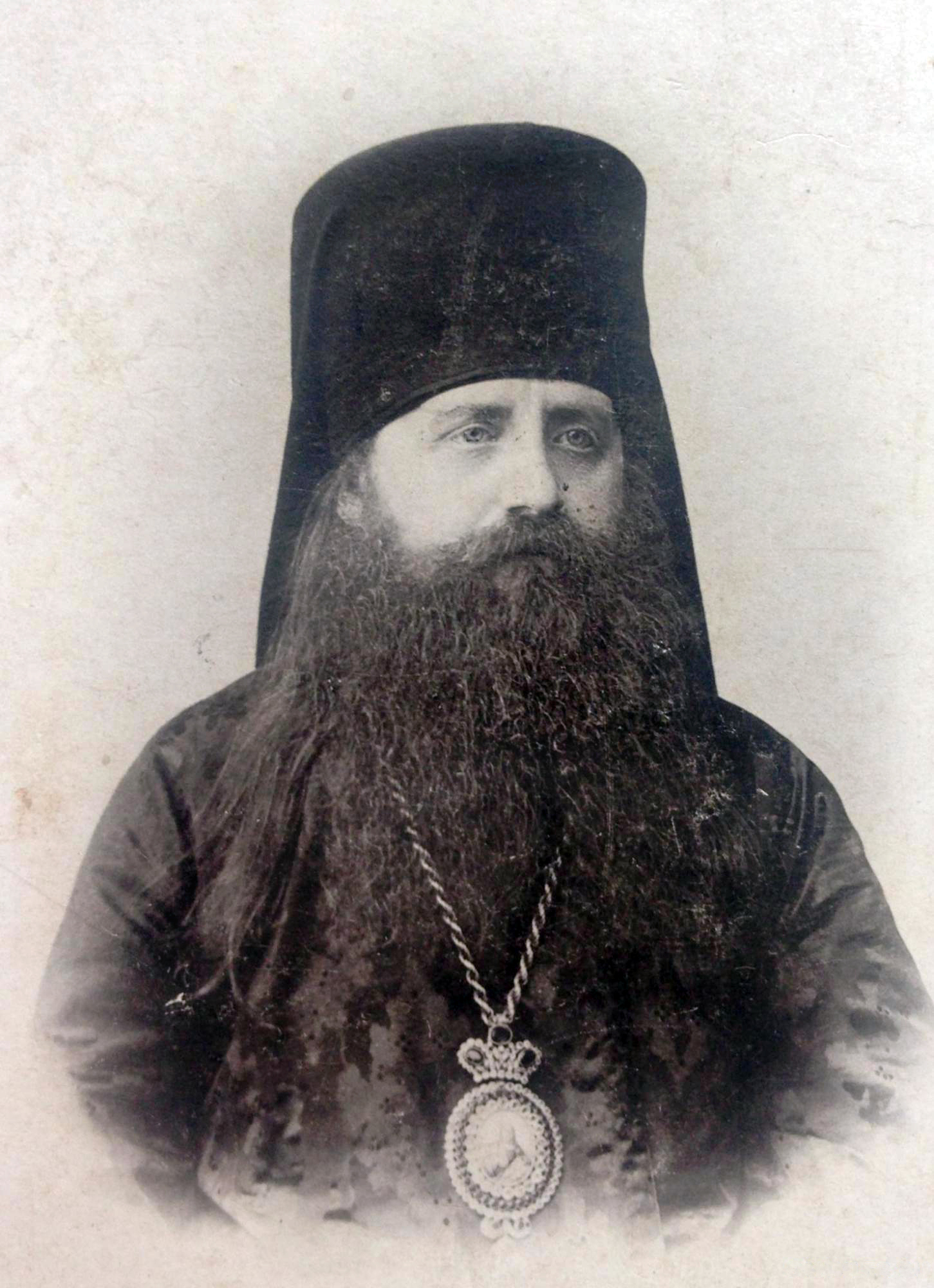
Bishop Anthony (Khrapovitsky) of Volhynia and Zhytomyr

In the same year Maxim Sandovich went to Russia, where secondary school education was not compulsory for candidates seeking admission to the Orthodox theological seminary, nor for the mere acceptance of priestly ordination. He stepped as an obedient to the Pochayev Lavra. He worked in a monastery printing house. In this monastery he was noticed by the archbishop Anthony (Khrapovitsky) of Volhynia and Zhytomir, who was one of the coordinators funded by the Russian state for the promotion of Orthodoxy in Galicia. This Hierarchy attached special importance to mobilizing missionaries from Galicia, who were supposed to obtain theological education in Russia and then return to their native areas as promoters of Orthodoxy. In agreement with the Archbishop, the Galician russophiles directed the young men (or even the boys) to Pochayev and Zhytomyr where they met Archbishop Anthony. And he directed them to university studies or to seminaries, often paying for their studies. Maxim Sandovich was also educated in Russia thanks to the scholarship granted by the Archbishop Anthony of Volhynia. Archbishop Anthony argued that the future missionary was his spiritual disciple.

Archbishop Anthony directed Sandovich to the theological seminary in Zhytomir. Even prior to the completion of study, during the family visit, the future clergyman was offered to take over the duties of the parish priest of the Orthodox parish in Grab, where the inhabitants of the community converted from the Greek Catholic faith. According to Anna Veronica Wendland, the initiator of this conversion was Sandovich, who, in consultation with the uniate priest Teodor Durkot from Zdynia, suggested the peasants of Grab to solve their conflict with the local clergyman with organizing an Orthodox pastoral institution. He declared the readiness of the exercise thereof.

In 1911 Sandovich graduated from the seminary for the best results in his year. He married Pelagia Grygoruk, daughter of an Orthodox priest from Nowe Berezowo. The wedding took place in one of the churches of the Monastery of the Nativity of the Virgin in Leśna. Prior to the priest's ordination, Archbishop Anthony asked Sandovich for his pastoral work in Galicia as the hierarch recommended it; in case of disagreement Archbishop Anthony suggested Sandovich to serve in Kiev. Sandovich intended to join the missionary campaign among the Greek-catholic Lemkos. Archbishop Anthony agreed and on November 17, 1911 he ordained Sandovich as a priest, directing him to the parish in Grab.

=== Activities in Galicia ===
Fr. Maxim Sandovich took over the parish in Grab. The first service at the local prayer house was celebrated on December 2, 1911. The 150 faithful participated in it. Along with him from Russia to Galicia came priests Ivan Ileczko, who took over the parish in Cieląż and Ignacy Hudyma, who became parish priest in Załucze.

Small religiousness of the Greek Catholic peasants and the ease with which they manipulated the Galician Russophiles, proclaiming the superiority of the Orthodox Church and the necessity of joining Galicia to Russia, raised the anxiety of the Austrian administration in an increasingly tense international situation. As in the case of the Hniliczki affair, the Austrian authorities considered it necessary to take a strong stand against the entire Russophile movement.

One of the means of limiting Russophile movement was the recognition as an illegal pastoral activity of Orthodox priests ordained in Russia, who did not have the consent of the Metropolitan of Bukovina to serve in his Galicia jurisdiction. Fr. Sandovich did not have such permission, but claimed that his direct superior was the Patriarch of Constantinople, and that the legitimacy of the Orthodox Church in Austria meant that any ordained cleric of this confession could operate in Galicia. This explanation did not convince the authorities, and Fr. Maxim Sandovich was arrested for eight days and sentenced to a fine of 400 crowns after the first service in the Grab, defined by the local authorities as one of Orthodox centers and pro-Russian propaganda. On December 22 or 24, 1911, the chapel in Grab was closed, but the clergyman continued to celebrate the service, using the rooms he made available in private homes. Such practices, in the context of the fight against russophiles, were prohibited. In this connection, Fr. Maxim Sandovich was again arrested and fined 300 crowns or month of arrest. Also, this time the priest did not cease his activity, making illegal worship not only in Grab but also in Wyszowadka and Długie. Consequently, on January 16, 1912, he was sentenced to seven weeks in jail. After serving his sentence he resumed his missionary work in favor of Orthodoxy. The priest was easily accepted by the local community because he maintained good contacts with local Greek-Catholic clerics on Rusophilian beliefs. Similar views were very lively among the Lemko people. According to Bernadetta Wójtowicz-Huber: "Sandowycz was an extraordinary personality. Despite the ban on further activities, thanks to charisma, deep faith and good repute, it became a symbol of the Lemko community".

The financial aspect of his activity has also contributed to the Sandovich's popularity. He gave away the poor people donations, gathered at the sacrifice, expecting them only to swear that they would not convert again to Catholicism. He and other missionaries who came from Russia offered low prices for religious services, raised funds from the Russian sources for the construction of new temples. For the Galician people, who lived in poverty, this was important. The authority of the clergyman also increased as penalties imposed on him. In the rural communities that have gone through Orthodoxy, the subsequent detention of the clergy tightened his ties with the faithful and contributed to his recognition as a martyr, persecuted by the authorities.

=== First arrest and trial ===
March 28, 1912, shortly after release from custody, Fr. Sandovich was again detained along with another Orthodox priest, Ignacy Hudyma. Initially, the clergymen were accused of measuring the length of the bridge in Cheremosh. They were then taken to the detention center in Lviv and charged with espionage for Russia.

The detention of priests Sandovich and Hudyma was part of wider Austrian antirussophile activities. In Lviv, Semen Bendasiuk was arrested. He was the organizer of the dormitory, promoting the Russophile ideas among young people, and Wasyl Kołdra, founder of the russophile reading room. In Hungarian Ruthenia, where the movement for Orthodoxy was even stronger than in Galicia, the process of 94 peasants, who 94 advocated conversion, accused of espionage and treason, was conducted between March 1913 and February 1914 in Marmaroschsiget, ended in a recognition of defendants guilty and punishing them with a long prison term.

In the opinion of Włodzimierz Osadczy: "On the eve of the war, the show trial over the Orthodox agitators was to be a warning to all forces sympathizing to Russia, and not only for the Rusyns but also for the growing power of Polish national democrats". The same author considered that the analogous task the Austrian authorities put up before the process of Bendasiuk, Kołdra, fr. Hudyma and fr. Sandovich, began March 9, 1914 in Lvov and lasted three months.

All accused in this trial were charged with espionage and betrayal of state expressed in the desire to detach "Ruthenian lands" from Austro-Hungary and join them in the Russian Empire. Both clerics were also accused of illegally celebrating the service and preaching and unlawful travel to Russia. Fr. Sandovich was also accused that he expressed in an offensive manner about the Catholic religion. On the twenty-ninth day of the trial, he was interrogated about the draft found in his notes, in which the clergyman contained his thoughts on Orthodox Church and the Union of Brest.

"The process of Bendasiuk and comrades", as it was called in the Galician press, was extensively reported in the press: reports from it were published by all Lviv newspapers; a number of foreign journals (French, German, Italian) sent his correspondents to Lviv. The greatest interest in this case was in Russia. The process was observed on the spot by representatives of the four main factions of the Russian State Duma. Contrary to the objectives of the Austrian authorities, who intended to ban the further activities of Russophiles during the war with Russia, the process not only was not a heavy blow to this movement, but contributed to the spread of his ideas. In addition, the Russian state treasury allocated 30,000 rubles for running a propaganda campaign accompanying the process. "Orthodox martyrdom in Galicia" was also publicized by the Archbishop Anthony (Khrapovitsky) of Volhynia, who in his eparchy issued a special circular on this subject and ordered after each Holy Liturgy to celebrate an additional service for the arrested russophiles. He himself contacted the Lviv court in writing, offering to testify as a witness. In Lviv there was a demonstration in defence of the accused, attended by near 80 Greek Catholic clergymen.

Hearings of the accused and witnesses proved the links between the Orthodox movement in Galicia and Russia, but the evidence gathered was not enough to confirm the allegation of treason and espionage contained in the indictment. In connection with this, on June 6, 1914, an acquittal issued by a jury of Poles was passed in relation to all defendants. The court found that the accused did not engage in politics and did not seek to tear Galicia away from Austria-Hungary. This judgment was dissatisfied with the Viennese government circles, which accused Poles of allowing (known as advocates) known Russophiles to the trial.

=== Second arrest and death ===
On June 7, 1914, Fr. Maxim Sandovich left the detention center and went to his parents' house in Zdynia. He resumed his pastoral activity in Grab. The co-accused with him in the trial did differently Stepan Bendasiuk and Vasyl Koldra, who immediately left for Russia and were taken there by Vladimir Bobrinsky, president of the Galician-Russian Society. Sandovich also intended to go to Russia, but he did not manage to collect the passport from the eldership in Gorlice. After the outbreak of World War I, in which Austria-Hungary and Russia found themselves in opposing blocks of fighting countries and the announcement of mobilization in Galicia, he was arrested on 4 August with his family: himself, his wife Pelagia, brother Mikołaj and father Tymoteusz were imprisoned in Gorlice.

After the declaration of war, the Austrian authorities continued their repression of the population showing pro-Russian sympathies. Many Russophiles or persons recognized as such were shot by the officers' independent decisions, without court judgments. In such circumstances, the priest was executed on September 6, 1914 in Gorlice The decision to execute him was made by rittmeister Ditrich, who arrived in Gorlice from Linz on 5 September. Fr Maxim Sandovich was shot in the courtyard of Gorlice prison at around 06:00. Witnesses to his execution were other residents of Gorlice and surrounding towns imprisoned on charges of Russophilia sympathies, including members of the cleric's family. According to their account, the priest at the last minute called out "Long live Holy Orthodoxy! Long live Holy Russia!" or "Long Live the Ruthenian people and Holy Orthodoxy". Fr Sandovich's funeral took place without the participation of his family in the cemetery in Gorlice. In 1922, at the request of the executed father and wife, his remains were exhumed and moved to the cemetery in Zdynia. It was co-financed by Lemkos-emigrants residing in the United States.

== Biography ==
- Lambertsen, Isaac E. (1999). Holy New Hieromartyr Maximus Sandovich: Protomartyr of the Lemko People. Liberty, TN: Saint John of Kronstadt Press. ISBN 0-912927-94-1.
- Osadczy, Włodzimierz (2007). Święta Ruś. Rozwój i oddziaływanie idei prawosławia w Galicji (in Polish). Lublin: Wydawnictwo Uniwersytetu Marii Curie-Skłodowskiej. ISBN 978-83-227-2672-3.
- Wójtowicz-Huber, Bernadetta (2008). "Ojcowie narodu". Duchowieństwo greckokatolickie w ruchu narodowym Rusinów galicyjskich (1867-1918) (in Polish). Warszawa: Wydawnictwa Uniwersytetu Warszawskiego. ISBN 978-83-235-0383-5.
- Charkiewicz, Jarosław (2008). Męczennicy XX wieku. Martyrologia Prawosławia w Polsce w biografiach świętych (in Polish). Warszawa: Warszawska Metropolia Prawosławna. ISBN 978-83-60311-11-0.
- Anna Rydzanicz. O przeszłości trzeba mówić. "Przegląd Prawosławny". 10 (268), październik 2007. Białystok. ISSN 1230-1078.
- Шевченко, Кирилл (2022). "Православие в истории Карпатской Руси: святой Максим Сандович (1886—1914) как символ карпато-русской идентичности" (PDF). Христианские ценности и межкультурное взаимодействие : Сборник научных статей международной научно-практической конференции, Брест, 17-18 июня 2022 года (in Russian). Брест. pp. 196–201.
