= Ciechania =

- Village
- Location within Poland
- Coordinates: 49°27′N 21°31′E
- Country: Poland
- Voivodeship: Subcarpathian
- County: Jasło
- Gmina: Krempna

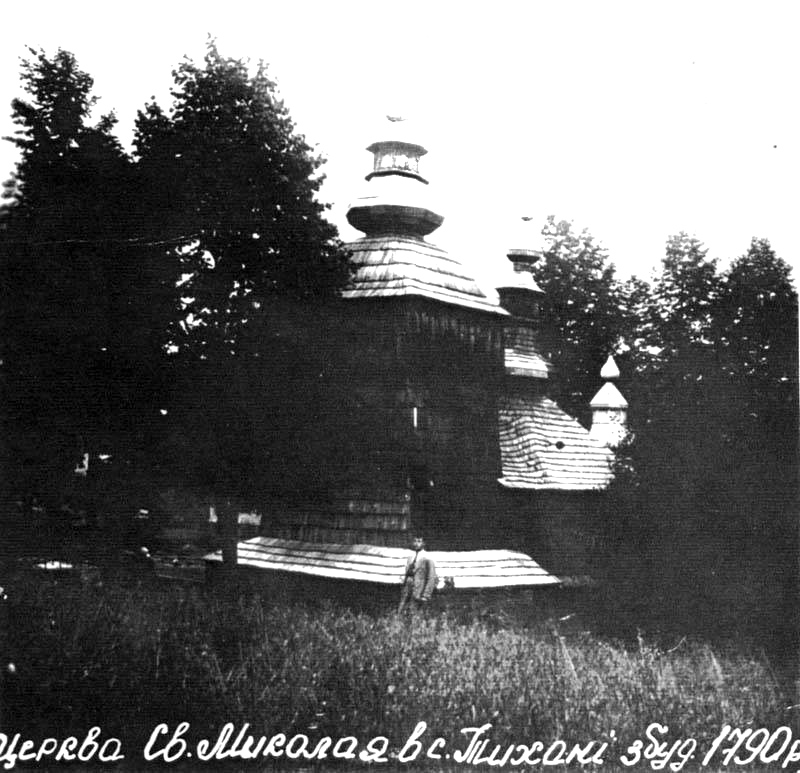
St. Nicholas Church in the village of Tychania (Ciechania), built in 1790, destroyed after World War II.

Ciechania [t͡ɕɛˈxaɲa] (RUE. Тиханя) was a Rusyn village in the administrative district of Gmina Krempna, within Jasło County, Subcarpathian Voivodeship, in south-eastern Poland, close to the border with Slovakia.

The village was founded by the Stadnicki family in the 16th century. At the end of the World War II it was a strong defensive outpost of the German forces. During the Battle of the Dukla Pass it was destroyed. Up to 2006 there was a picturesque tourist track through the Ciechania valley which was closed by the authorities of the Magura National Park.
