= Michael Smerconish =

American journalist (born 1962)

- Born: March 15, 1962 (age 64); Doylestown, Pennsylvania, U.S.
- Education: Lehigh University (BA); University of Pennsylvania (JD)
- Occupations: SiriusXM host, CNN and CNN International host, columnist, author, political analyst, lawyer
- Political party: Republican (before 2010); Independent (2010–present)
- Spouse: Lavinia Nardini
- Website: smerconish.com

Michael Andrew Smerconish (/smɜːrˈkɒnɪʃ/ smur-KAHN-ish; born March 15, 1962) is an American radio host, television presenter, political commentator, author, and lawyer. He hosts The Michael Smerconish Program on SiriusXM's POTUS Channel and a weekly program on CNN and CNN International. A former Sunday columnist for The Philadelphia Inquirer, he has authored seven books and serves as counsel at the Philadelphia law firm Kline & Specter.

== Early life and education ==
Smerconish was born on March 15, 1962, in Doylestown, Pennsylvania, to Florence (née Grovich) and Walter Smerconish. His mother is Montenegrin, coming from Cetinje in the former Yugoslavia. His father's family is Carpatho-Rusyn, tracing their roots to the village of Swierzowa Ruska, located in modern Southeast Poland, not far from the Slovak border. He graduated from Central Bucks High School West and earned his B.A. from Lehigh University in Bethlehem, Pennsylvania, followed by a Juris Doctor degree from the University of Pennsylvania Law School.

Raised in a Republican household, Smerconish began corresponding with Democratic Mayor Frank L. Rizzo as a teenager. In 1980, his father unsuccessfully ran for the Pennsylvania state legislature, with Smerconish helping on the campaign. That same year, he founded Youth for Reagan/Bush at Lehigh University. While attending law school, he ran for the Pennsylvania state legislature but lost the Republican primary by 419 votes.

Afterward, Smerconish resumed his legal studies and continued working on political campaigns. In 1986, he managed the Philadelphia campaign for U.S. Senator Arlen Specter's re-election, and in 1987, he served as political director for Frank Rizzo's unsuccessful mayoral bid.

== Career ==
After graduating from law school, Smerconish co-founded a title insurance agency with his brother Wally. At 29, he was appointed regional administrator for Philadelphia Region III of the U.S. Department of Housing and Urban Development under Secretary Jack Kemp, during the George H. W. Bush administration.

Following George H. W. Bush's 1992 election loss, Smerconish spent a decade practicing law with renowned trial attorney James E. Beasley, Sr. specializing in complex tort litigation. His clients ranged from the Philadelphia Fraternal Order of Police to professional boxer Orlin Norris. He also successfully sued abortion provider Kermit Gosnell in a medical malpractice case. Today, Smerconish is of counsel at the law firm Kline & Specter.

On October 19, 2008, after previously supporting only Republican presidential candidates, Smerconish endorsed Barack Obama for president. In a Salon essay, he criticized the Republican Party's failure to capture Osama bin Laden and expressed his frustrations, which led to his endorsement. He called for the GOP to adopt moderation on social issues to align with suburban voters.

In 2010, Smerconish announced he had left the Republican Party, later voting for Gary Johnson in the 2016 election. Commentators noted his shift to the political center, with The Washington Post writing that he bet his career on there being "a great untapped center" in politics.

=== Media ===
In the spring of 1990, Smerconish made his first radio appearance as a guest on Philadelphia's 96.5 FM WWDB, eventually transitioning from guest to guest-host. By 1993, he hosted his own Sunday night program, balancing this with his legal career. After broadcaster Dominic Quinn's death in 1996, Smerconish moved to weekend mornings, but left WWDB in 1997 when the station began airing infomercials disguised as programs. He then joined CBS affiliate WPHT, initially on afternoons, later taking over the morning slot in 2003 after Don Imus was fired.

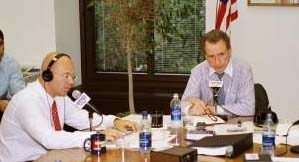
Michael Smerconish interviews United States Senator Arlen Specter in October 2002 (on radio station 1210 AM WPHT) about whether there is a connection between the events of September 11 and the Oklahoma City bombing.

In February 2009, Smerconish's radio show went into national syndication, and on August 20, 2009, he became the first talk radio host to interview President Barack Obama live from the White House. He also interviewed Presidents Jimmy Carter, George H. W. Bush, Bill Clinton, and George W. Bush, as well as Vice Presidents Al Gore, Dick Cheney, and Joe Biden.

Smerconish's television career began with local appearances in Philadelphia, eventually leading to national exposure on CNN and MSNBC. He appeared regularly on CNN's TalkBack Live and guest-hosted Scarborough Country on MSNBC. In 2007, he hosted Don Imus's time slot on MSNBC following Imus's firing, and later became a regular substitute for Chris Matthews on Hardball.

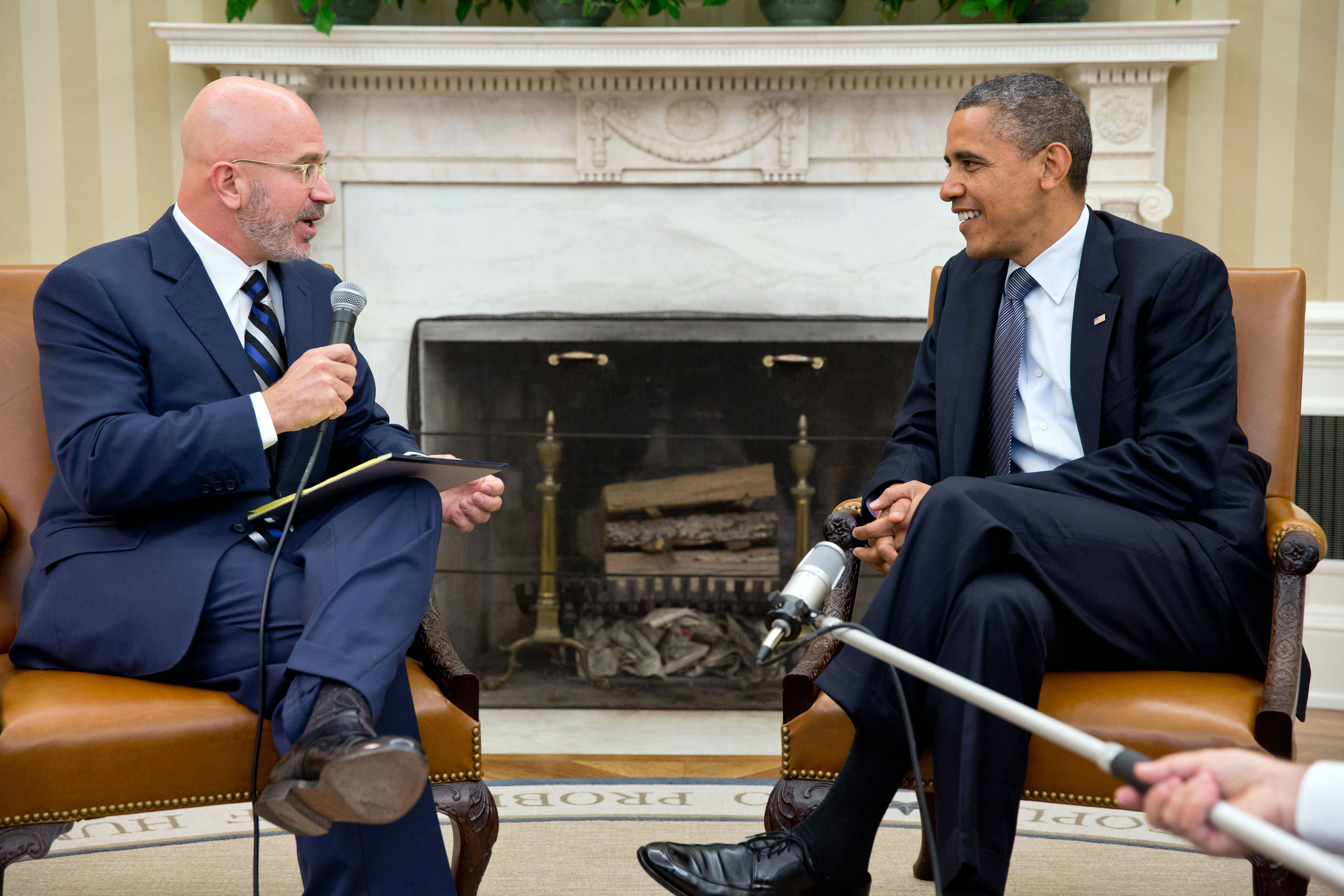
Smerconish interviewing President Barack Obama in the Oval Office on October 26, 2012

In 2013, Smerconish moved his radio show to Sirius XM's POTUS Channel, citing his desire for nonpartisan discussions after leaving the Republican Party in 2010. In 2014, he left MSNBC to host his own program on CNN titled "Smerconish", which airs on Saturdays. He also runs daily political and current events polls which he discusses on his daily Newsletter, YouTube channel, daily SiriusXM show and CNN show. The questions usually touch on the main topic of discussion of the day.

To mark 30 years in talk radio, Smerconish released an autobiographical, one-man film, Things I Wish I Knew Before I Started Talking, which initially aired on CNN in July 2020, and then became a special on Hulu.

== Books ==
Following the September 11 attacks, Smerconish became interested in the 9/11 Commission's investigation, specifically a question posed by Commissioner John Lehman to Secretary of State Condoleezza Rice, regarding political correctness in airport security. Lehman suggested that there was a limit on how many Arab males could be screened at airports, which Smerconish wrote about in the Philadelphia Daily News. His investigation led to his testimony before a Senate subcommittee, and he later authored Flying Blind: How Political Correctness Continues to Compromise Airline Safety Post 9/11 (2004), donating all proceeds to a 9/11 memorial.

Smerconish's second book, Muzzled: From T-Ball to Terrorism (2007), became a New York Times bestseller, linking political correctness to challenges in fighting terrorism. His third book, Murdered by Mumia (2007), co-written with Maureen Faulkner, recounted the murder of Philadelphia police officer Daniel Faulkner. Smerconish donated the book's proceeds to a charitable fund for Faulkner.

In Morning Drive: Things I Wish I Knew Before I Started Talking (2009), Smerconish reflected on his career and political transformation. His fifth book, Instinct: The Man Who Stopped the 20th Hijacker (2009), told the story of Jose Melendez-Perez, a customs officer who helped prevent the 20th hijacker's entry into the U.S. before 9/11. Smerconish donated proceeds from this book to the Flight 93 National Memorial.

Smerconish's first fictional book, Talk: A Novel (2014), explores the rise of a conservative talk show host, Stan Powers, who must decide whether to continue parroting talking points or stay true to his beliefs. Warner Horizon Television optioned the rights to the novel. His next book, Clowns to the Left of Me, Jokers to the Right (2018), compiled 100 of his columns from The Philadelphia Inquirer and Philadelphia Daily News. He donated proceeds to the Children's Crisis Treatment Center and later developed a one-man show, "American Life in Columns," which he toured across the U.S.

=== Smercomics 2024 ===
In 2024, Michael Smerconish released Smercomics 2024 — a coffee‑table collection of political cartoons chronicling the chaotic and unconventional 2024 U.S. presidential election, illustrated by Pulitzer‑Prize winning cartoonists Jack Ohman, Steve Breen, Rob Rogers, and Scott Stantis. With only 10,000 copies printed, the edition sold out quickly, raising $200,000 (USD) in book sales and a personal contribution from Smerconish for the Children’s Crisis Treatment Center.

== Recognition ==
Smerconish has been recognized with three honorary degrees: a Doctor of Humane Letters from Widener University in 2016, another Doctor of Humane Letters from Delaware Valley College in 2018, and a Doctor of Science from the University of the Sciences in 2020.

He has earned numerous accolades for his work in media, including being named one of America's most important talk show hosts by Talkers Magazine. In 2003, he was listed among Pennsylvania's most influential political figures by The Pennsylvania Report, and in 2006, Radio & Records honored him as the nation's Local Personality of the Year. The National Association of Broadcasters selected him as a Marconi Award finalist in 2011 for Best Network/Syndicated Host. Additionally, Philadelphia magazine named him the city's best talk show host in 2004 and counted him among its most powerful citizens.

== Controversy ==
As part of the 2024 pro-Palestinian protests on university campuses, students at Dickinson College protested to revoke Michael Smerconish's invitation as commencement speaker for the Class of 2024 due to remarks in his 2004 book Flying Blind advocating for racial profiling. In response, Smerconish addressed the students' demands on his podcast and website, stating that although he had not reviewed the book recently, he would likely "stand behind every single word."

Subsequently, Dickinson College decided to revoke his invitation and honorary degree, citing "overwhelming opposition from our faculty and students" and concerns that his presence could distract from the commencement event, according to President John E. Jones.

In December 2024, Smerconish lamented the fact that there are no makeshift memorials commemorating the death of UnitedHealthcare CEO Brian Thompson who was assassinated in New York City earlier that month. Smerconish compared Thompson to cultural icons such as John Lennon as well as victims of police brutality like George Floyd and people who'd been victims of political violence such as Heather Heyer who was murdered by a far-right extremist while counter-protesting at the Unite the Right rally.

== Lawsuit ==
On July 15, 2025, Michael Smerconish, Jeffery Doty, Rachel Shanok, and David Thornburgh filed a lawsuit against the Commonwealth of Pennsylvania for the right of independently registered voters to participate in the state's primary elections. The four plaintiffs assert that their exclusion from primary elections is a violation of their voting rights under the Free and Equal Election Clause of the Pennsylvania Constitution.

In his essay detailing his reasoning for filing the lawsuit, Smerconish stated that “there are more than one million [independently] registered voters here in Pennsylvania and yet, we don’t have a say in primary elections even though our tax dollars are being used to stage such contests... which are often destiny, effectively determining the outcome in a majority of Pennsylvania state House and state Senate races.”

In an increasingly polarized, bipartisan climate, Smerconish champions centrist influence in politics. “Our missing voice is often one of moderation which is in short supply in our polarized times. I firmly believe that when independent voters are excluded from the nomination process, we foster the rise of the extremes at both ends of the political spectrum. Better would be a system that forces candidates to have to appeal to a broader cross-section of society including those for whom compromise is not a dirty word.”
