= Świerzowa Ruska =

Świerzowa Ruska Свipжoвa pycькa
- Village
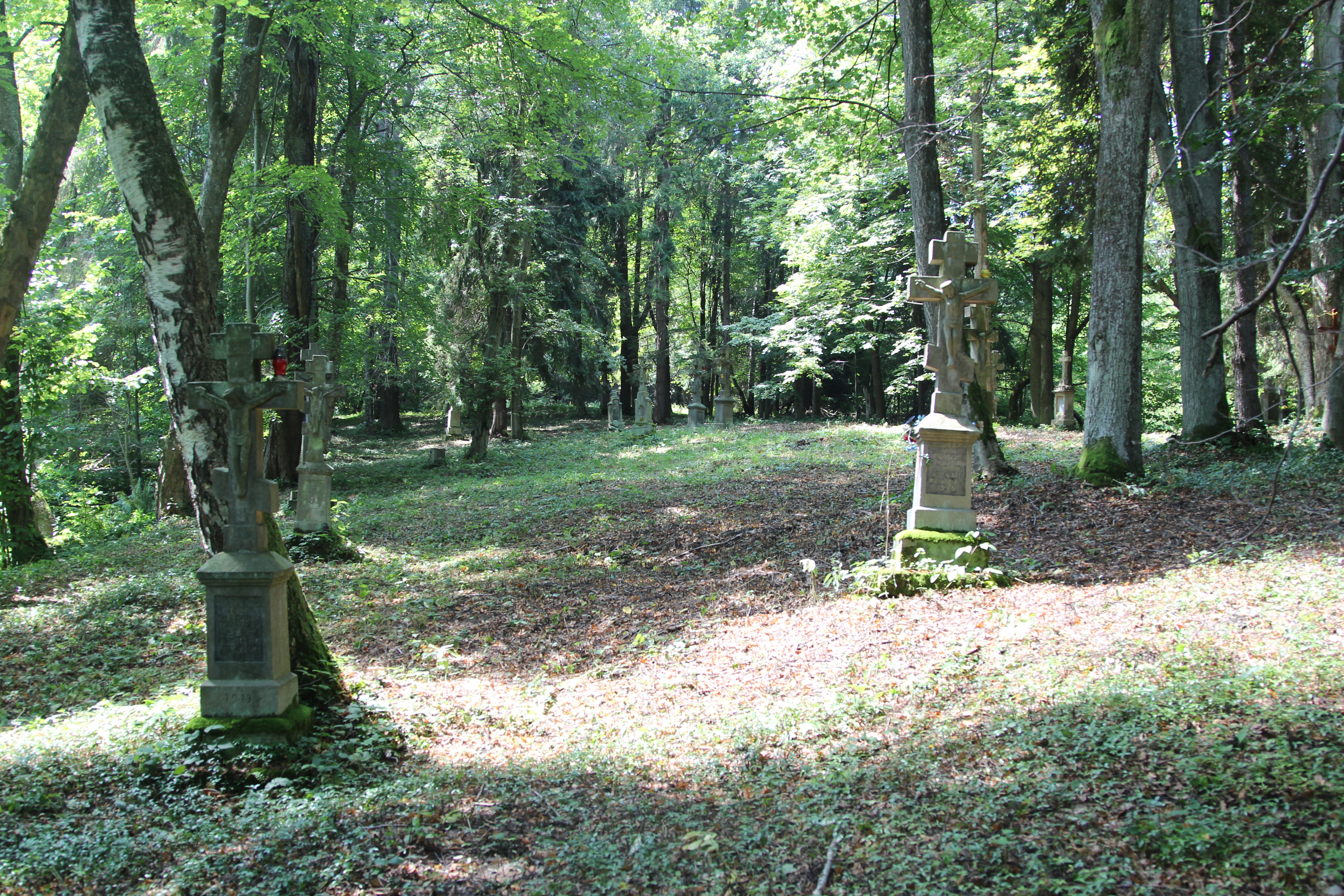
- Old cemetery in Świerzowa Ruska

- Location within Poland
- Coordinates: 49°33′N 21°26′E
- Country: Poland
- Voivodeship: Subcarpathian
- County: Jasło
- Gmina: Krempna
- Postal code: 38-232

Świerzowa Ruska (Polish: [ɕfjɛˈʐɔva ˈruska]) is an abandoned village in the administrative district of Gmina Krempna, within Jasło County, Subcarpathian Voivodeship, in south-eastern Poland, close to the border with Slovakia.

Currently all that's left from the village is cemetery and some wayside crosses. Since 1995 Świerzowa's nature is protected by the Magura National Park.

== History ==
The village's history reaches 16th century. It had its own parish, later moved to Świątkowa Wielka. The last Greek catholic church was built 1894, on the other side of the stream, on a hill. The church was made out of wood. The village cemetery, located next to the church, survived to this day. After the war, Lemkos were mostly resettled to Ukrainian USSR, the village ended up with 9 citizens. All of them were resettled in Operation Vistula to the Recovered Territories in 1947. Currently the village is abandoned.
