= Sadki, Podkarpackie Voivodeship =

Sadki
- Village
- Location within Poland
- Coordinates: 49°37′08″N 21°33′34″E
- Country: Poland
- Voivodeship: Podkarpackie
- County: Jasło
- Gmina: Nowy Żmigród

Sadki [ˈsatki] is a village in the administrative district of Gmina Nowy Żmigród, within Jasło County, Podkarpackie Voivodeship, in south-eastern Poland.
