= Makowiska, Podkarpackie Voivodeship =

Makowiska
- Village
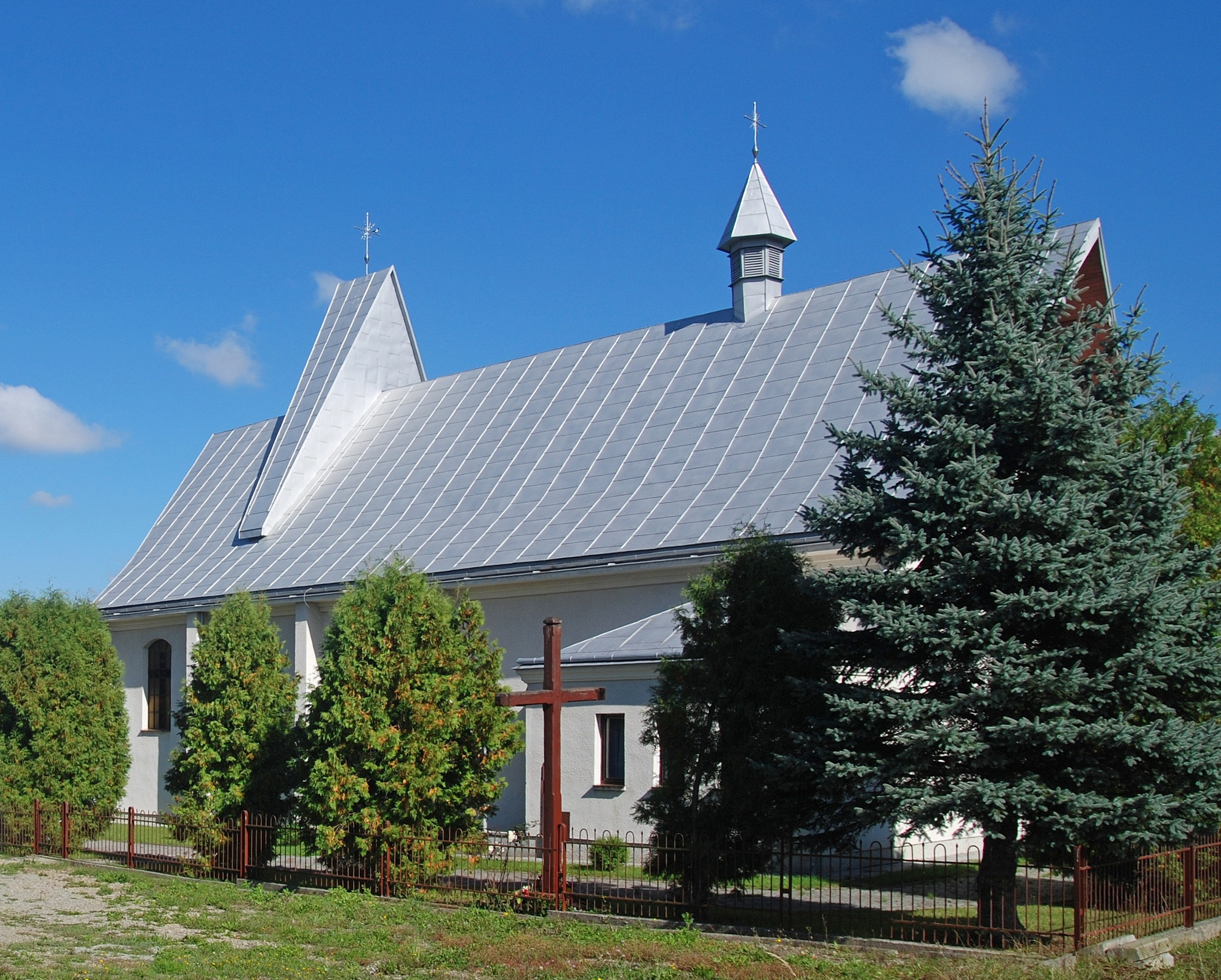
- Church of Holy Trinity

- Location within Poland
- Coordinates: 49°36′N 21°36′E
- Country: Poland
- Voivodeship: Subcarpathian
- County: Jasło
- Gmina: Nowy Żmigród

Makowiska [makɔˈviska] is a village in the administrative district of Gmina Nowy Żmigród, within Jasło County, Subcarpathian Voivodeship, in south-eastern Poland.
