= Gmina Nowy Żmigród =

Gmina Nowy Żmigród Nowy Żmigród Commune
- Gmina
- Coat of arms
- Interactive map of Gmina Nowy Żmigród
- Coordinates (Nowy Żmigród): 49°36′27″N 21°31′30″E
- Country: Poland
- Voivodeship: Subcarpathian
- County: Jasło
- Seat: Nowy Żmigród

Area
  - Total: 104.54 km^{2} (40.36 sq mi)

Population (2006)
  - Total: 9,303
  - Density: 88.99/km^{2} (230.5/sq mi)
- Website: https://www.nowyzmigrod.eu/

Gmina Nowy Żmigród is a rural gmina (administrative district) in Jasło County, Subcarpathian Voivodeship, in south-eastern Poland. Its seat is the village of Nowy Żmigród, which lies approximately 17 kilometres (11 mi) south of Jasło and 59 km (37 mi) south-west of the regional capital Rzeszów.

The gmina covers an area of 104.54 square kilometres (40.4 sq mi), and as of 2006 its total population is 9,303.

== Villages ==
Gmina Nowy Żmigród contains the villages and settlements of Brzezowa, Desznica, Gorzyce, Grabanina, Jaworze, Kąty, Łężyny, Łysa Góra, Makowiska, Mytarka, Mytarz, Nienaszów, Nowy Żmigród, Sadki, Siedliska Żmigrodzkie, Skalnik, Sośniny, Stary Żmigród and Toki.

== Neighbouring gminas ==
Gmina Nowy Żmigród is bordered by the gminas of Brzyska, Chorkówka, Dębowiec, Dukla, Krempna, Osiek Jasielski and Tarnowiec.
