= Sośniny =

- Village
- Location within Poland
- Coordinates: 49°36′45″N 21°36′11″E
- Country: Poland
- Voivodeship: Subcarpathian
- County: Jasło
- Gmina: Nowy Żmigród

Sośniny [sɔɕˈninɨ] is a village in the administrative district of Gmina Nowy Żmigród, within Jasło County, Subcarpathian Voivodeship, in south-eastern Poland.
