= Gmina Krempna =

Gmina Krempna Krempna Commune
- Gmina
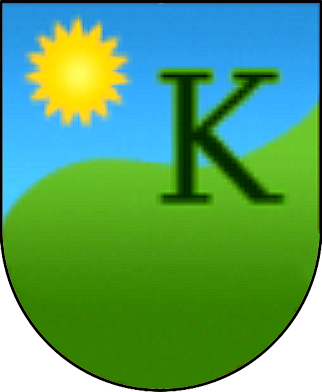
- Coat of arms
- Interactive map of Gmina Krempna
- Coordinates (Krempna): 49°31′0″N 21°31′0″E
- Country: Poland
- Voivodeship: Subcarpathian
- County: Jasło
- Seat: Krempna

Area
  - Total: 205.11 km^{2} (79.19 sq mi)

Population (2006)
  - Total: 1,963
  - Density: 9.570/km^{2} (24.79/sq mi)
- Website: http://www.krempna.giwan.pl/

Gmina Krempna is a rural gmina (administrative district) in Jasło County, Subcarpathian Voivodeship, in south-eastern Poland, on the Slovak border. Its seat is the village of Krempna, which lies approximately 26 kilometres (16 mi) south of Jasło and 68 km (42 mi) south-west of the regional capital Rzeszów.

The gmina covers an area of 203.58 square kilometres (78.6 sq mi), and as of 2006 its total population is 1,963.

== Villages ==
Gmina Krempna contains the villages and settlements of Ciechania, Grab, Huta Krempska, Huta Polańska, Kotań, Krempna, Myscowa, Ożenna, Polany, Rozstajne, Świątkowa Mała, Świątkowa Wielka, Świerzowa Ruska, Wrzosowa Polana, Wyszowatka and Żydowskie.

== Neighbouring gminas ==
Gmina Krempna is bordered by the gminas of Dukla, Nowy Żmigród, Osiek Jasielski and Sękowa. It also borders Prešovský Kraj in Slovakia.
