= Stary Żmigród =

- Village
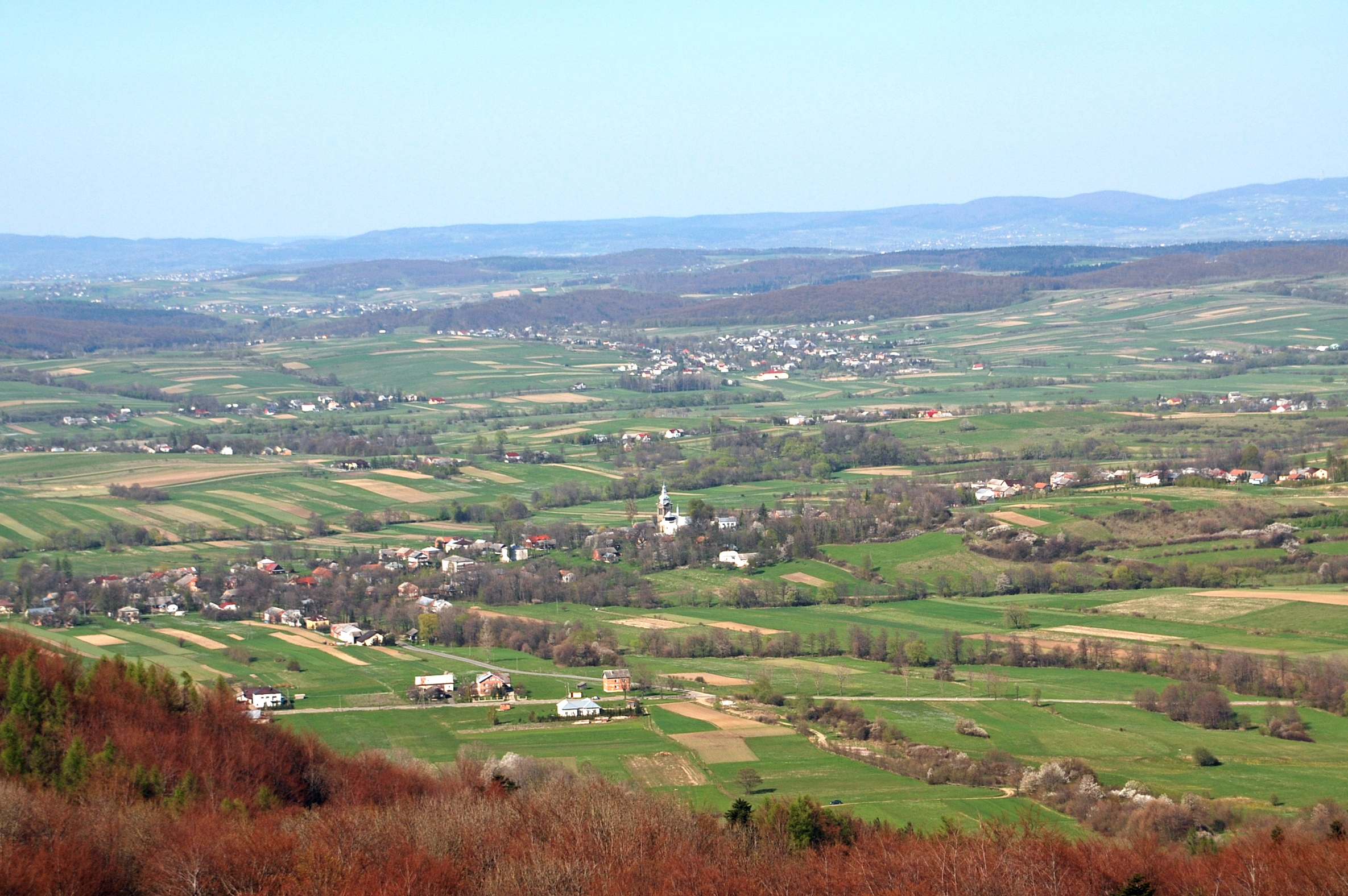
- General view of the village

- Location within Poland
- Coordinates: 49°36′N 21°34′E
- Country: Poland
- Voivodeship: Subcarpathian
- County: Jasło
- Gmina: Nowy Żmigród
- Time zone: UTC+1 (CET)
  - Summer (DST): UTC+2 (CEST)

Stary Żmigród [ˈstarɨ ˈʐmiɡrut] (until 1968 Żmigród Stary) is a village in the administrative district of Gmina Nowy Żmigród, within Jasło County, Subcarpathian Voivodeship, in south-eastern Poland.

Five Polish citizens were murdered by Nazi Germany in the village during World War II.
