= Mytarka =

- Village
- Location within Poland
- Coordinates: 49°36′49″N 21°31′27″E
- Country: Poland
- Voivodeship: Podkarpackie
- County: Jasło
- Gmina: Nowy Żmigród

Mytarka [mɨˈtarka] is a village in the administrative district of Gmina Nowy Żmigród, within Jasło County, Podkarpackie Voivodeship, in southeastern Poland.
