= Gorzyce, Jasło County =

Gorzyce
- Village
- Location within Poland
- Coordinates: 49°38′N 21°32′E
- Country: Poland
- Voivodeship: Subcarpathian
- County: Jasło
- Gmina: Nowy Żmigród

Gorzyce [ɡɔˈʐɨt͡sɛ] is a village in the administrative district of Gmina Nowy Żmigród, within Jasło County, Subcarpathian Voivodeship, in south-eastern Poland.
