= Żydowskie =

- Village
- Location within Poland
- Coordinates: 49°28′N 21°29′E
- Country: Poland
- Voivodeship: Subcarpathian
- County: Jasło
- Gmina: Krempna

Żydowskie [ʐɨˈdɔfskʲɛ] Ukrainian Жидівське Zhydivske is a village in the administrative district of Gmina Krempna, within Jasło County, Subcarpathian Voivodeship, in south-eastern Poland, close to the border with Slovakia.
