= Nienaszów =

- Village
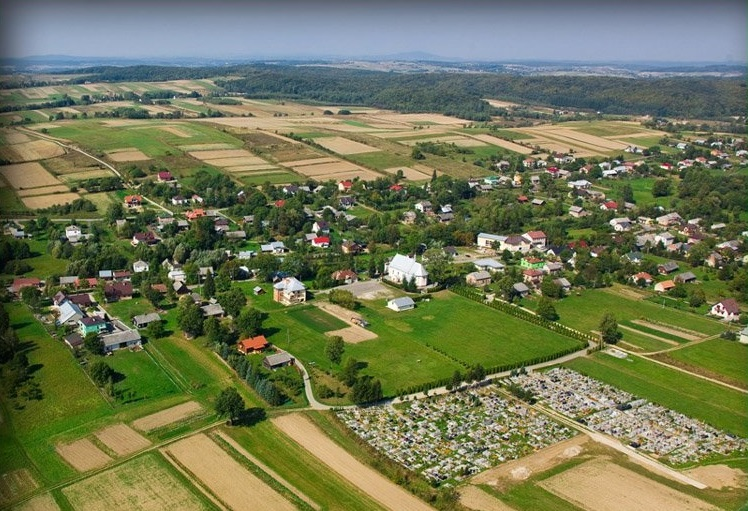
- Aerial view of Nienaszów

- Location within Poland
- Coordinates: 49°38′N 21°35′E
- Country: Poland
- Voivodeship: Subcarpathian
- County: Jasło
- Gmina: Nowy Żmigród

Population (approx.)
  - Total: 1,200

Nienaszów [ɲɛˈnaʂuf] is a village in the administrative district of Gmina Nowy Żmigród, within Jasło County, Subcarpathian Voivodeship, in south-eastern Poland.
