= Łężyny =

- Village
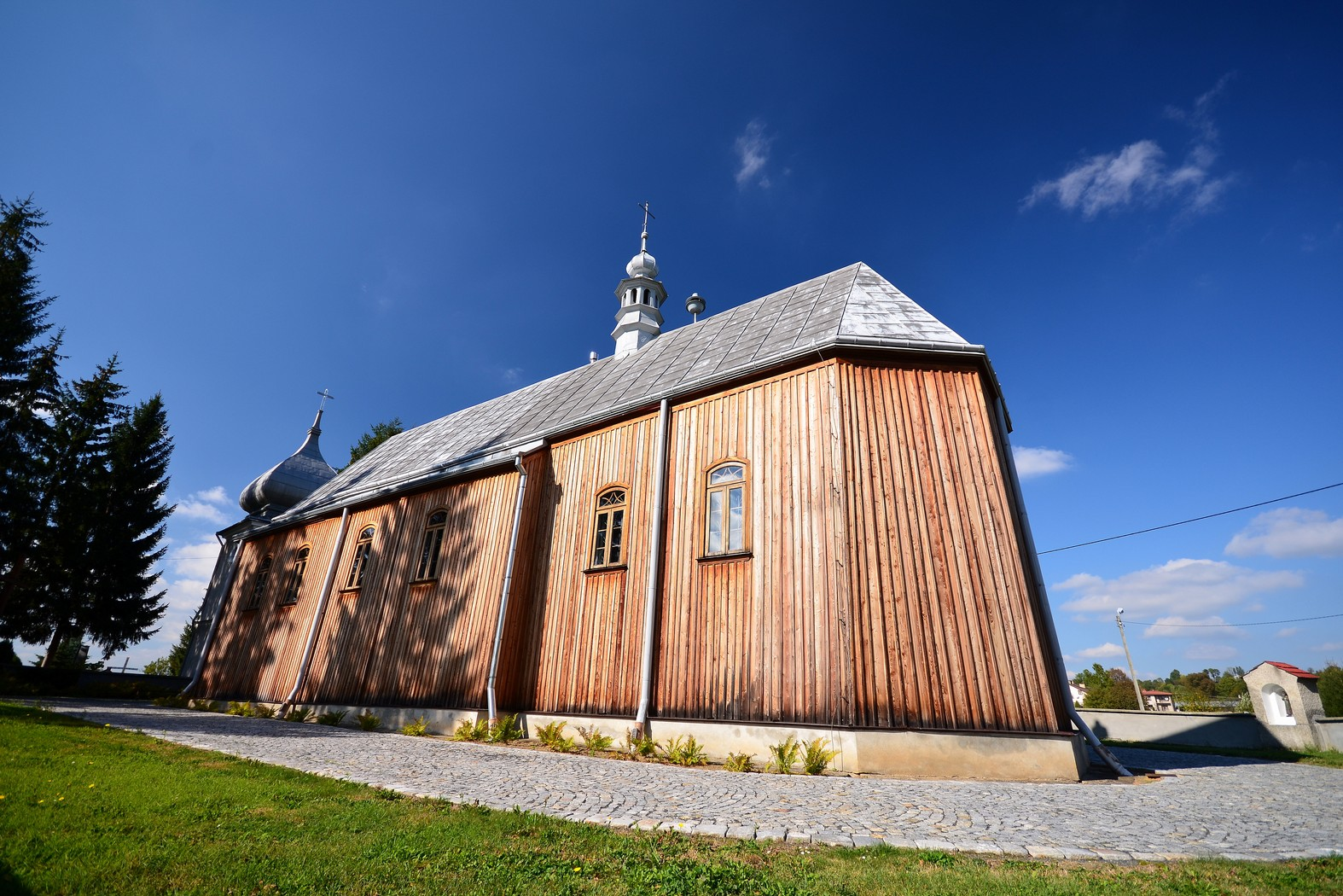
- Church of Saint Nicholas

- Location within Poland
- Coordinates: 49°40′N 21°32′E
- Country: Poland
- Voivodeship: Subcarpathian
- County: Jasło
- Gmina: Nowy Żmigród

Łężyny [wɛ̃ˈʐɨnɨ] is a village in the administrative district of Gmina Nowy Żmigród, within Jasło County, Subcarpathian Voivodeship, in south-eastern Poland.
