= Wrzosowa Polana =

- Settlement
- Location within Poland
- Coordinates: 49°31′6″N 21°29′33″E
- Country: Poland
- Voivodeship: Subcarpathian
- County: Jasło
- Gmina: Krempna

Wrzosowa Polana [vʐɔˈsɔva pɔˈlana] is a settlement in the administrative district of Gmina Krempna, within Jasło County, Subcarpathian Voivodeship, in south-eastern Poland, close to the border with Slovakia.
