= Łysa Góra, Podkarpackie Voivodeship =

Łysa Góra
- Village
- Location within Poland
- Coordinates: 49°34′32″N 21°34′14″E
- Country: Poland
- Voivodeship: Subcarpathian
- County: Jasło
- Gmina: Nowy Żmigród
- Highest elevation: 420 m (1,380 ft)
- Lowest elevation: 401 m (1,316 ft)
- Population: 750

Łysa Góra [ˈwɨsa ˈɡura] is a village in the administrative district of Gmina Nowy Żmigród, within Jasło County, Subcarpathian Voivodeship, in south-eastern Poland.
