= Grabanina =

- Village
- Location within Poland
- Coordinates: 49°36′41″N 21°33′38″E
- Country: Poland
- Voivodeship: Podkarpackie
- County: Jasło
- Gmina: Nowy Żmigród
- Elevation: 265 m (869 ft)
- Population: 150

Grabanina [ɡrabaˈnina] is a village in the administrative district of Gmina Nowy Żmigród, within Jasło County, Podkarpackie Voivodeship, in south-eastern Poland.
