= Ożenna =

- Village
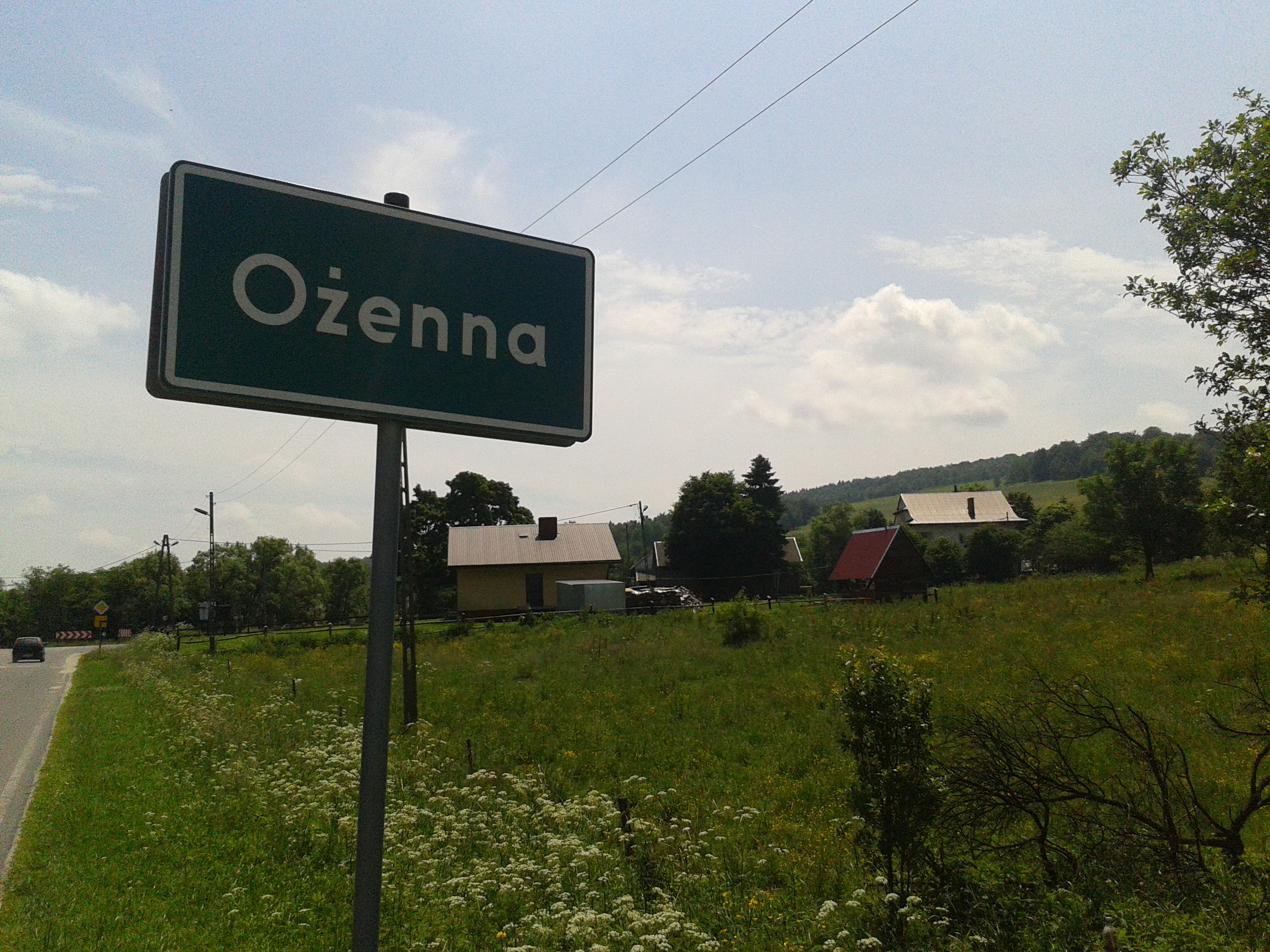
- Welcome sign

- Location within Poland
- Coordinates: 49°25′40″N 21°27′42″E
- Country: Poland
- Voivodeship: Subcarpathian
- County: Jasło
- Gmina: Krempna
- Population: 120

Ożenna [ɔˈʐɛnːa] is a village in the administrative district of Gmina Krempna, within Jasło County, Subcarpathian Voivodeship, in south-eastern Poland, close to the border with Slovakia.

Prior to Operation Vistula it was largely inhabited by Lemkos.

Three World War I cemeteries are located in the village.
