= Toki, Podkarpackie Voivodeship =

Toki
- Village
- Location within Poland
- Coordinates: 49°37′N 21°32′E
- Country: Poland
- Voivodeship: Subcarpathian
- County: Jasło
- Gmina: Nowy Żmigród
- Time zone: UTC+1 (CET)
  - Summer (DST): UTC+2 (CEST)
- Vehicle registration: RJS

Toki [ˈtɔki] is a village in the administrative district of Gmina Nowy Żmigród, within Jasło County, Subcarpathian Voivodeship, in south-eastern Poland.

Four Polish citizens were murdered by Nazi Germany in the village during World War II.
