= Wyszowatka =

- Village
- Location within Poland
- Coordinates: 49°27′14″N 21°25′10″E
- Country: Poland
- Voivodeship: Subcarpathian
- County: Jasło
- Gmina: Krempna

Wyszowatka [vɨʂɔˈvatka] (Rusyn: Вишоватка, Vyshovatka) is a village in the administrative district of Gmina Krempna, within Jasło County, Podkarpackie Voivodeship, in south-eastern Poland, close to the border with Slovakia.
