= Huta Polańska =

- Village
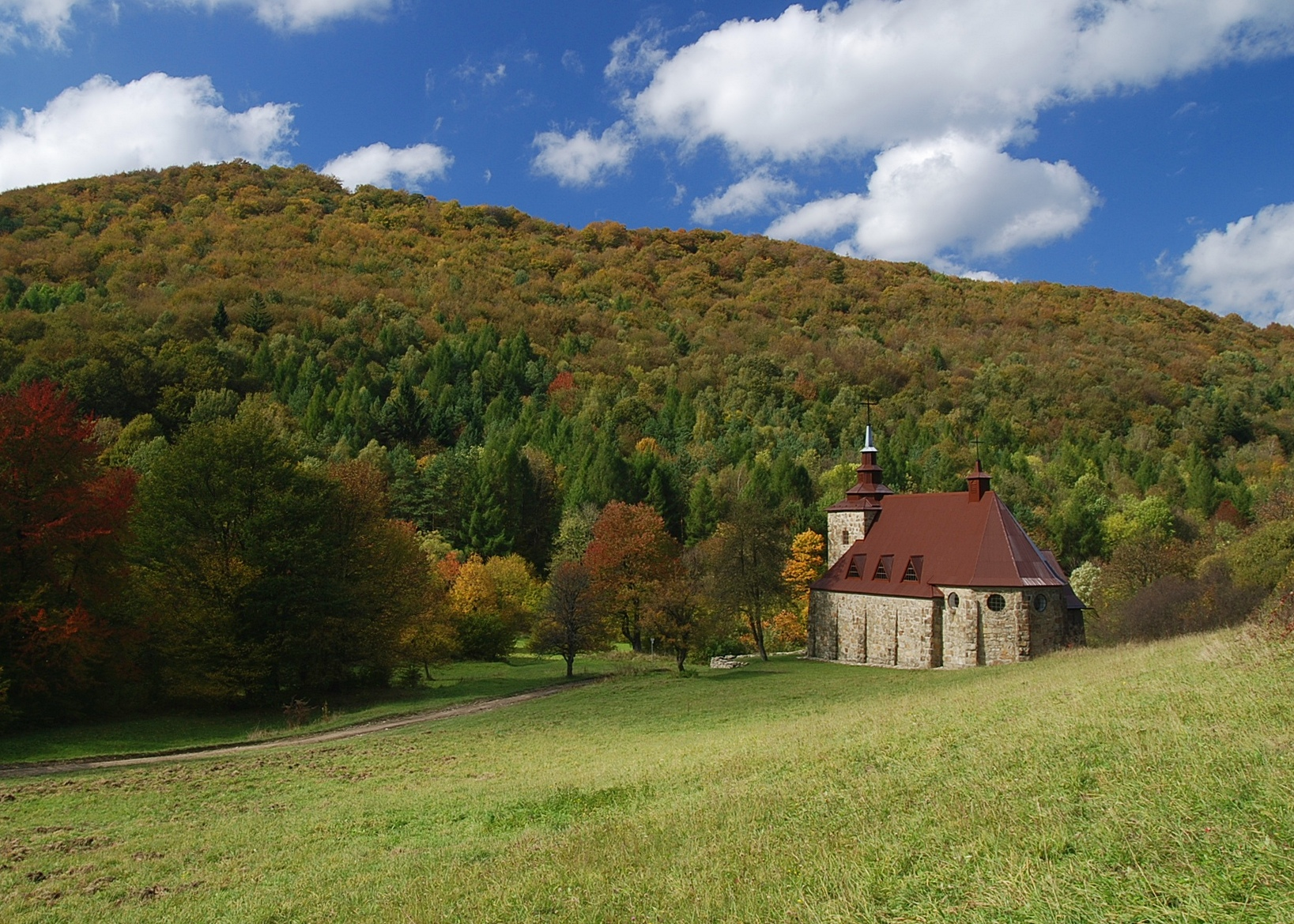

- Location within Poland
- Coordinates: 49°28′N 21°33′E
- Country: Poland
- Voivodeship: Subcarpathian
- County: Jasło
- Gmina: Krempna
- Time zone: UTC+1 (CET)
  - Summer (DST): UTC+2 (CEST)
- Vehicle registration: RJS

Huta Polańska [ˈxuta pɔˈlaɲska] is a village in the administrative district of Gmina Krempna, within Jasło County, Subcarpathian Voivodeship, in south-eastern Poland, close to the border with Slovakia.

Five Polish citizens were murdered by Nazi Germany in the village during World War II.

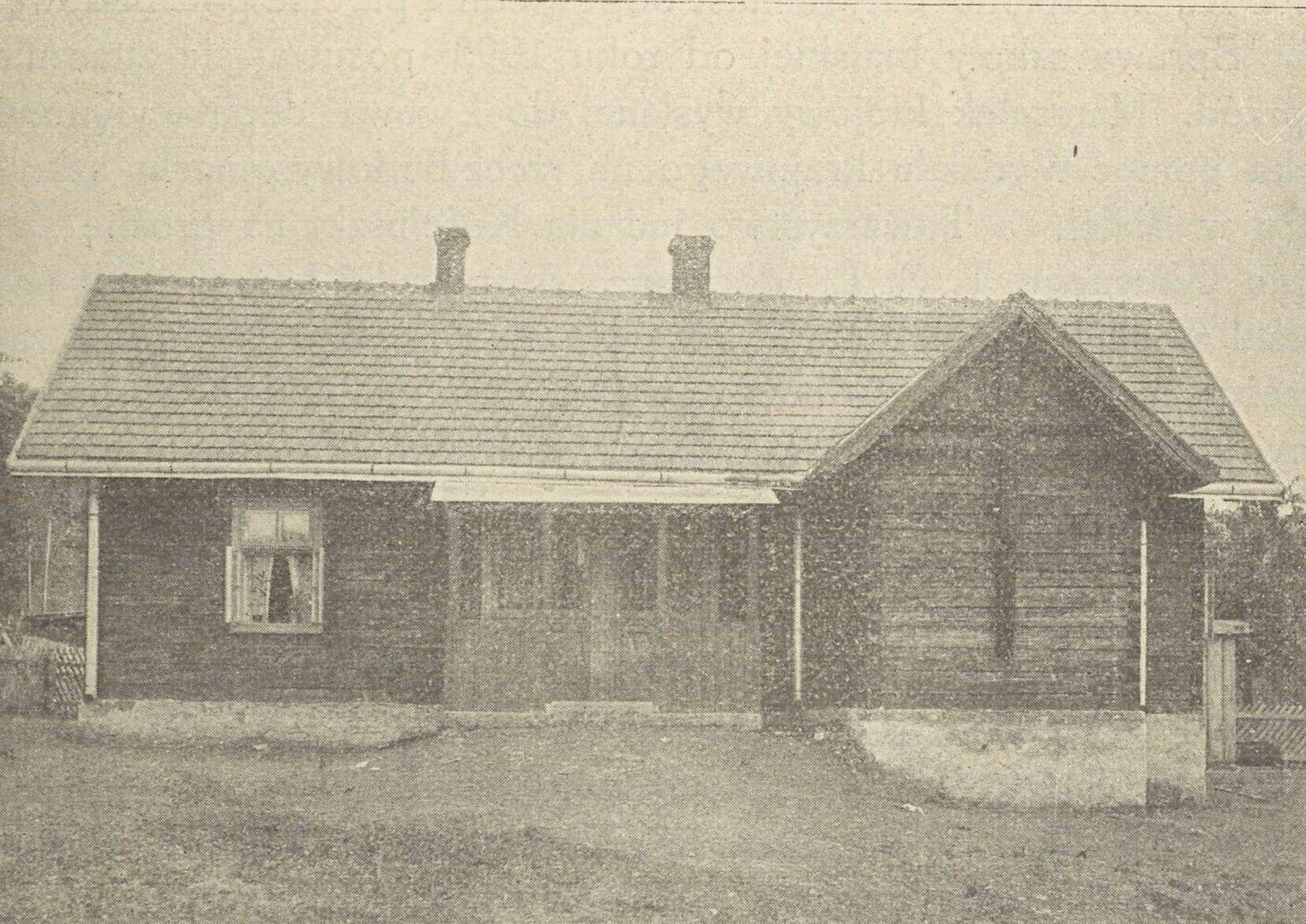
Polish school in Huta Polanska, before 1911
