= Jaworze, Podkarpackie Voivodeship =

Jaworze
- Village
- Location within Poland
- Coordinates: 49°33′N 21°27′E
- Country: Poland
- Voivodeship: Subcarpathian
- County: Jasło
- Gmina: Nowy Żmigród

Jaworze [jaˈvɔʐɛ] (Rusyn: Явір'я, Yavirya) is a village in the administrative district of Gmina Nowy Żmigród, within Jasło County, Subcarpathian Voivodeship, in south-eastern Poland.
