= Krempna =

- Village
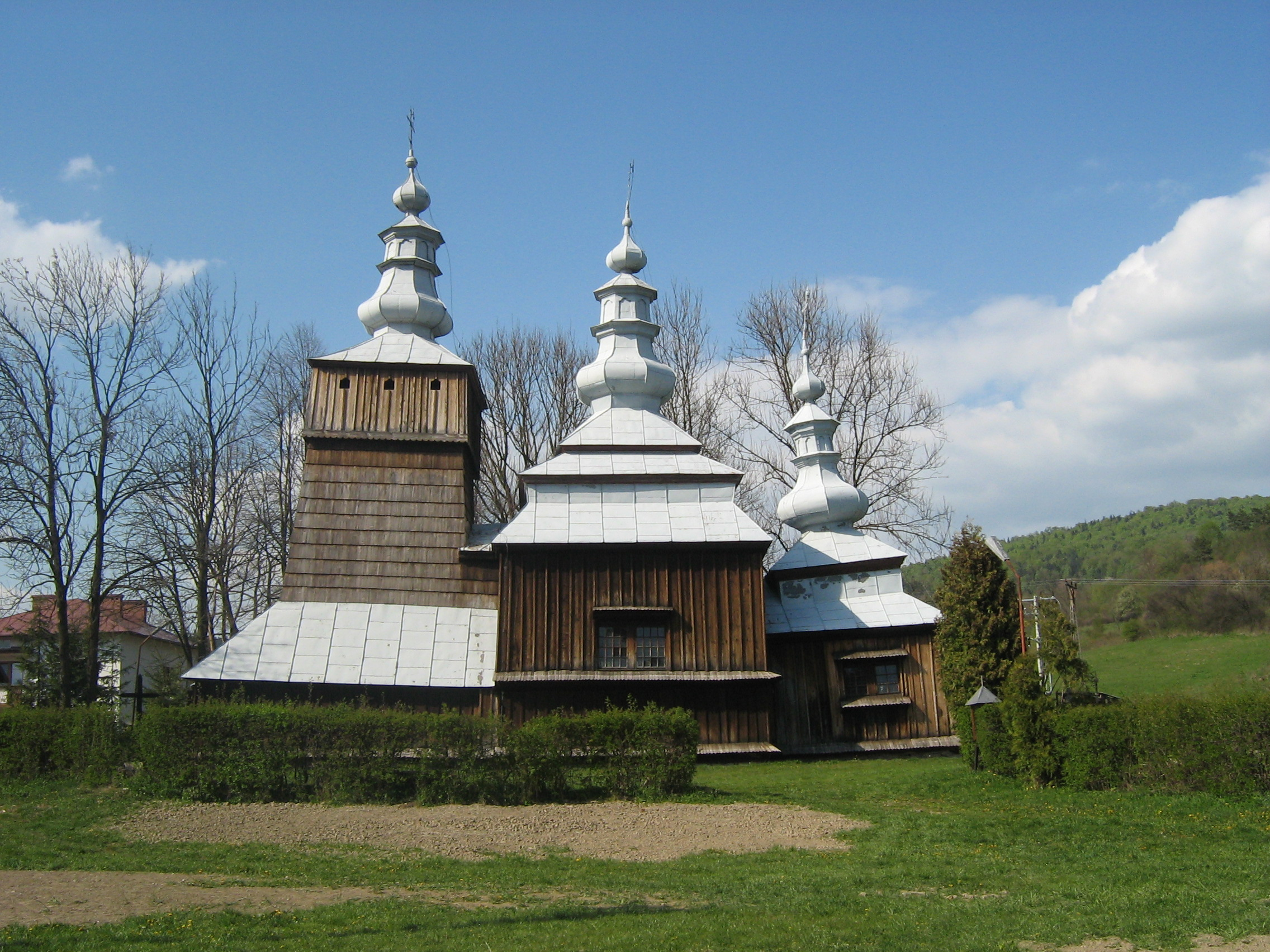
- Former Greek Catholic church in Krempna
- Interactive map of Krempna
- Location within Poland
- Coordinates: 49°31′N 21°31′E
- Country: Poland
- Voivodeship: Subcarpathian
- County: Jasło
- Gmina: Krempna
- Population: 500

Krempna [ˈkrɛmpna] is a village in Jasło County, Subcarpathian Voivodeship, in south-eastern Poland, close to the border with Slovakia. It is the seat of the gmina (administrative district) called Gmina Krempna.
