= Grab, Podkarpackie Voivodeship =

Grab
- Village
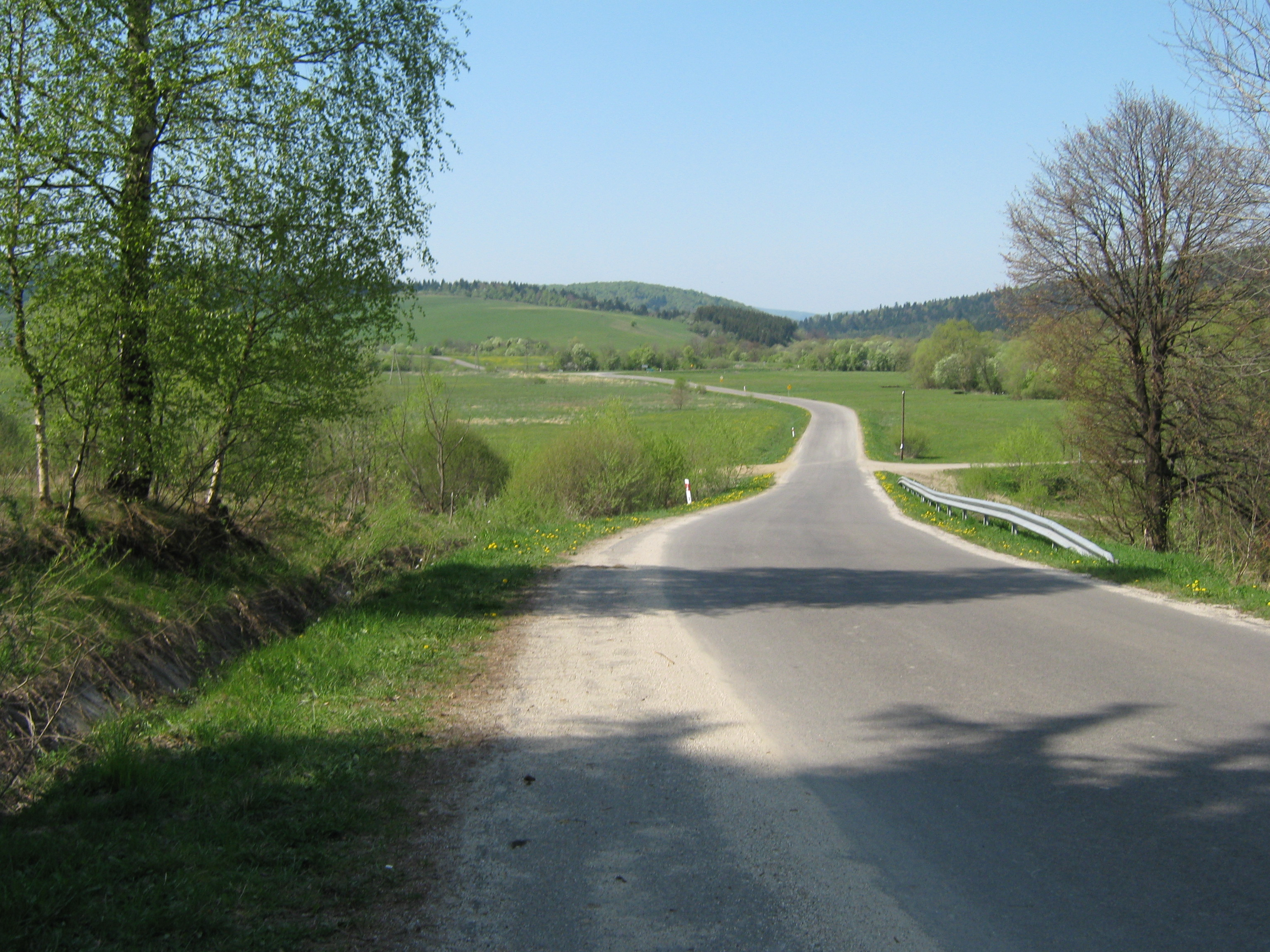
- Road through the village

- Location within Poland
- Coordinates: 49°27′N 21°26′E
- Country: Poland
- Voivodeship: Subcarpathian
- County: Jasło
- Gmina: Krempna

Grab [ɡrap] Ukr.Граб}}, Hrab) is a village in the administrative district of Gmina Krempna, within Jasło County, Subcarpathian Voivodeship, in south-eastern Poland, close to the border with Slovakia.

Prior to Operation Vistula it was largely inhabited by Lemkos.

Two World War I cemeteries are located in the village.
