= Brzezowa, Podkarpackie Voivodeship =

Brzezowa
- Village
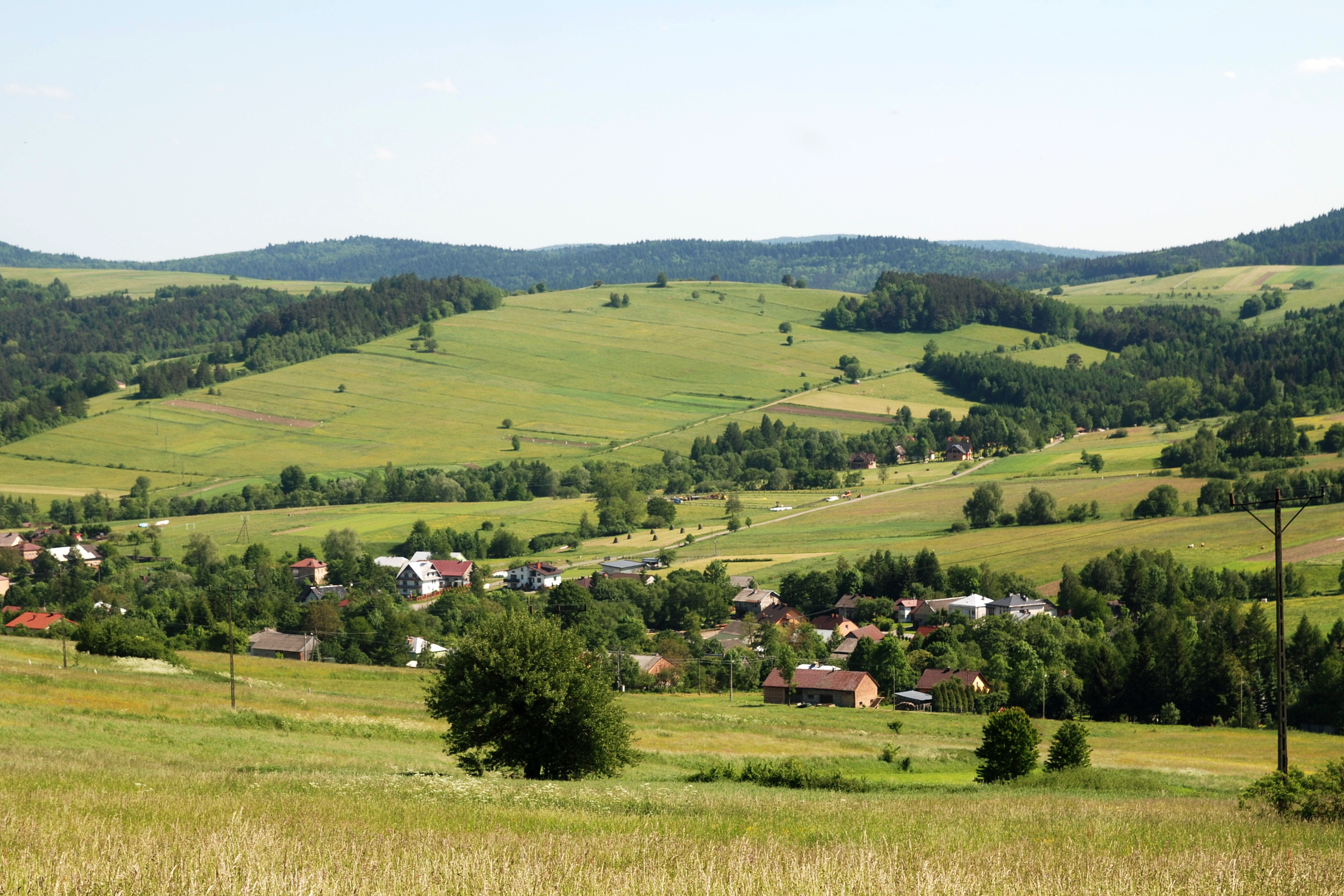
- Brzezowa

- Location within Poland
- Coordinates: 49°35′N 21°29′E
- Country: Poland
- Voivodeship: Subcarpathian
- County: Jasło
- Gmina: Nowy Żmigród

Brzezowa [bʐɛˈzɔva] (Rusyn: Березова) is a village in the administrative district of Gmina Nowy Żmigród, within Jasło County, Subcarpathian Voivodeship, in south-eastern Poland.
