= Polany, Podkarpackie Voivodeship =

Polany
- Village
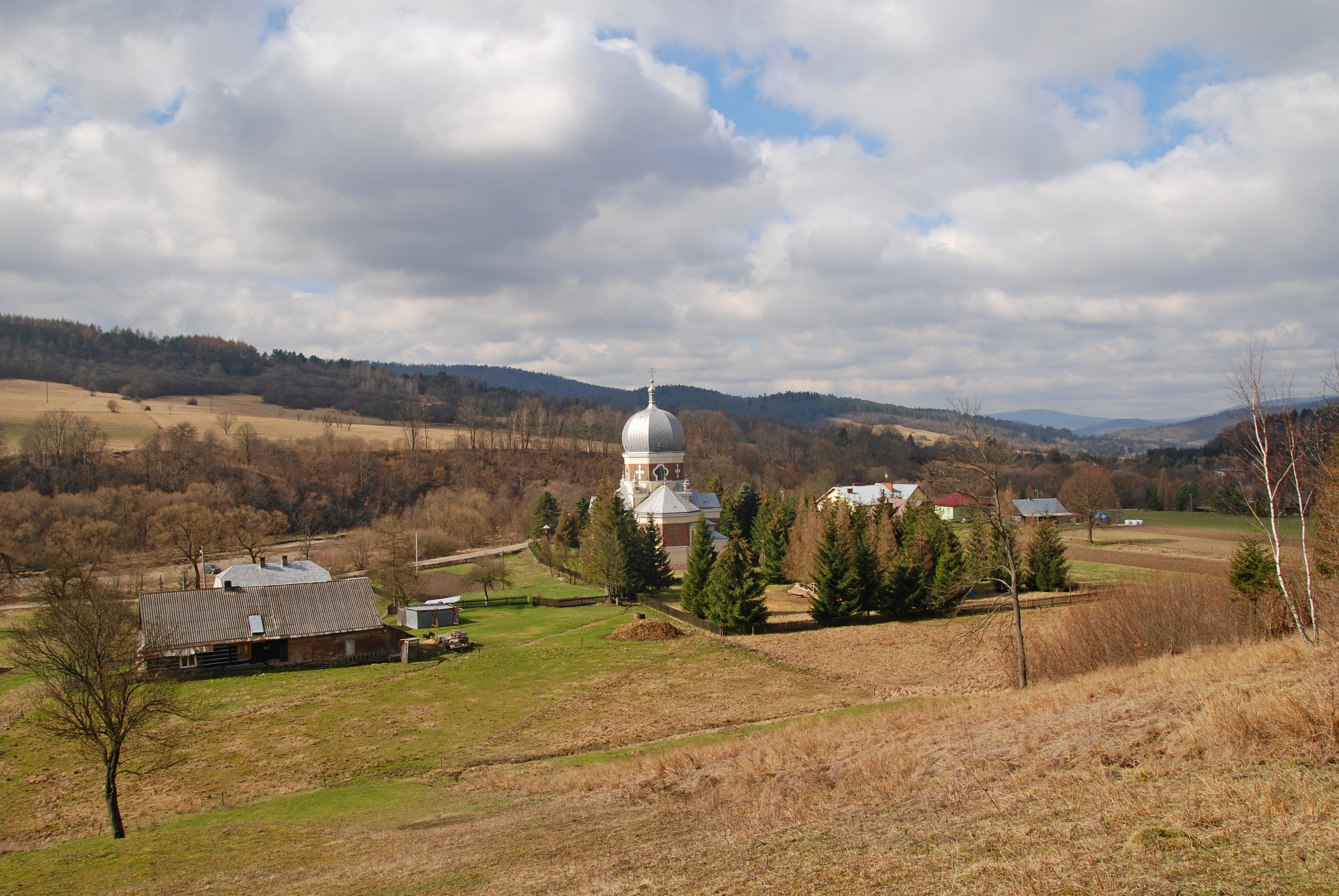
- View of Polany with the Saint John Chrysostom church

- Location within Poland
- Coordinates: 49°29′43″N 21°34′2″E
- Country: Poland
- Voivodeship: Subcarpathian
- County: Jasło
- Gmina: Krempna

Population
  - Total: 320
- Time zone: UTC+1 (CET)
  - Summer (DST): UTC+2 (CEST)

Polany [pɔˈlanɨ] is a village in the administrative district of Gmina Krempna, within Jasło County, Subcarpathian Voivodeship, in south-eastern Poland, close to the border with Slovakia.
