= Kąty, Podkarpackie Voivodeship =

Kąty
- Village
- Location within Poland
- Coordinates: 49°33′39″N 21°31′14″E
- Country: Poland
- Voivodeship: Subcarpathian
- County: Jasło
- Gmina: Nowy Żmigród
- Population: 1,000
- Website: http://katy.pl

Kąty [ˈkɔntɨ] is a village in the administrative district of Gmina Nowy Żmigród, within Jasło County, Subcarpathian Voivodeship, in south-eastern Poland.
