= Nowy Żmigród =

Village in Subcarpathian Voivodeship, Poland

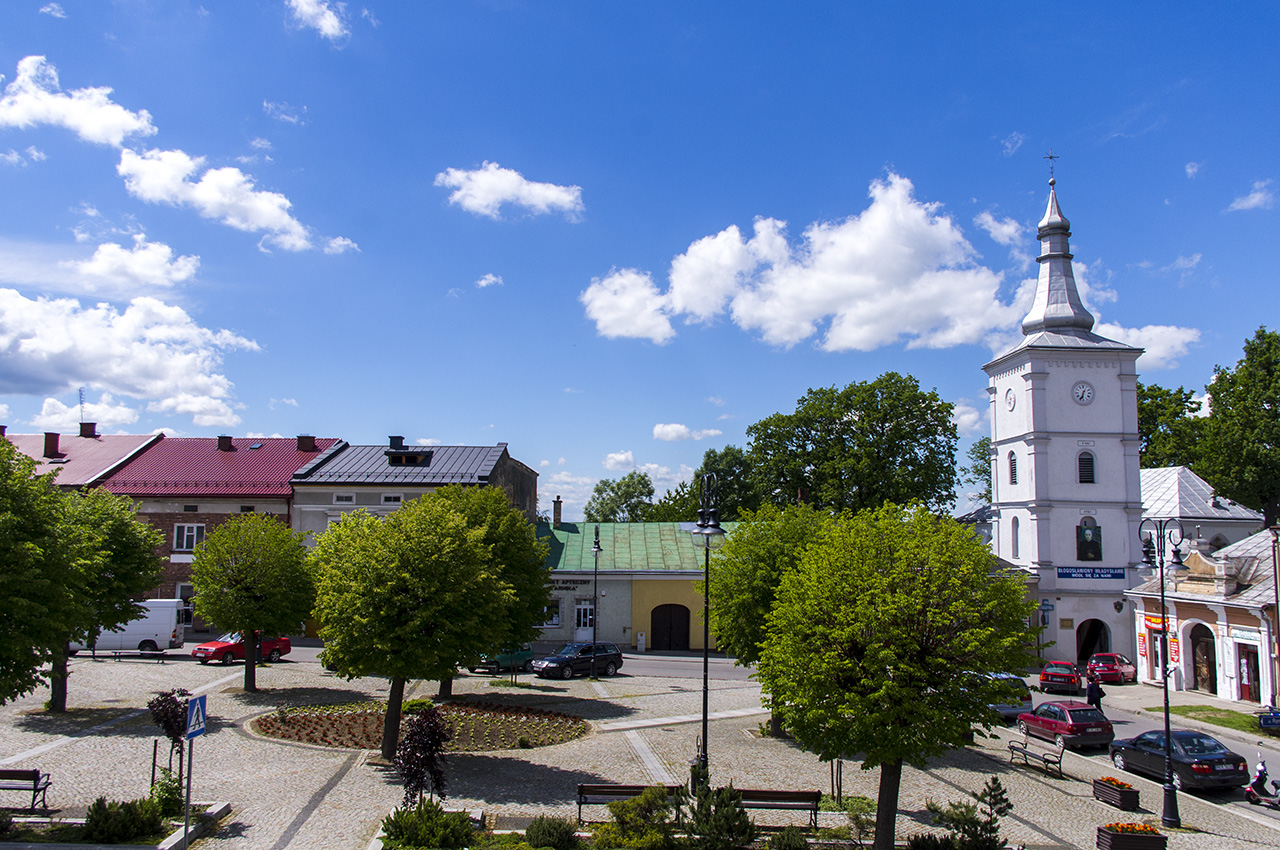
- Market square

- Coat of arms

- Location within Poland
- Coordinates: 49°37′N 21°32′E
- Country: Poland
- Voivodeship: Subcarpathian
- County: Jasło
- Gmina: Nowy Żmigród

Area
  - Total: 24.41 km^{2} (9.42 sq mi)

Population (2006)
  - Total: 6,076
  - Density: 248.9/km^{2} (644.7/sq mi)
- Time zone: UTC+1 (CET)
  - Summer (DST): UTC+2 (CEST)
- Car plates: RJS
- Website: Official website

Nowy Żmigród is a village and rural municipality (gmina) in Jasło County, Subcarpathian Voivodeship, Poland. It surrounds many small villages making it a hub of the area.

== History ==
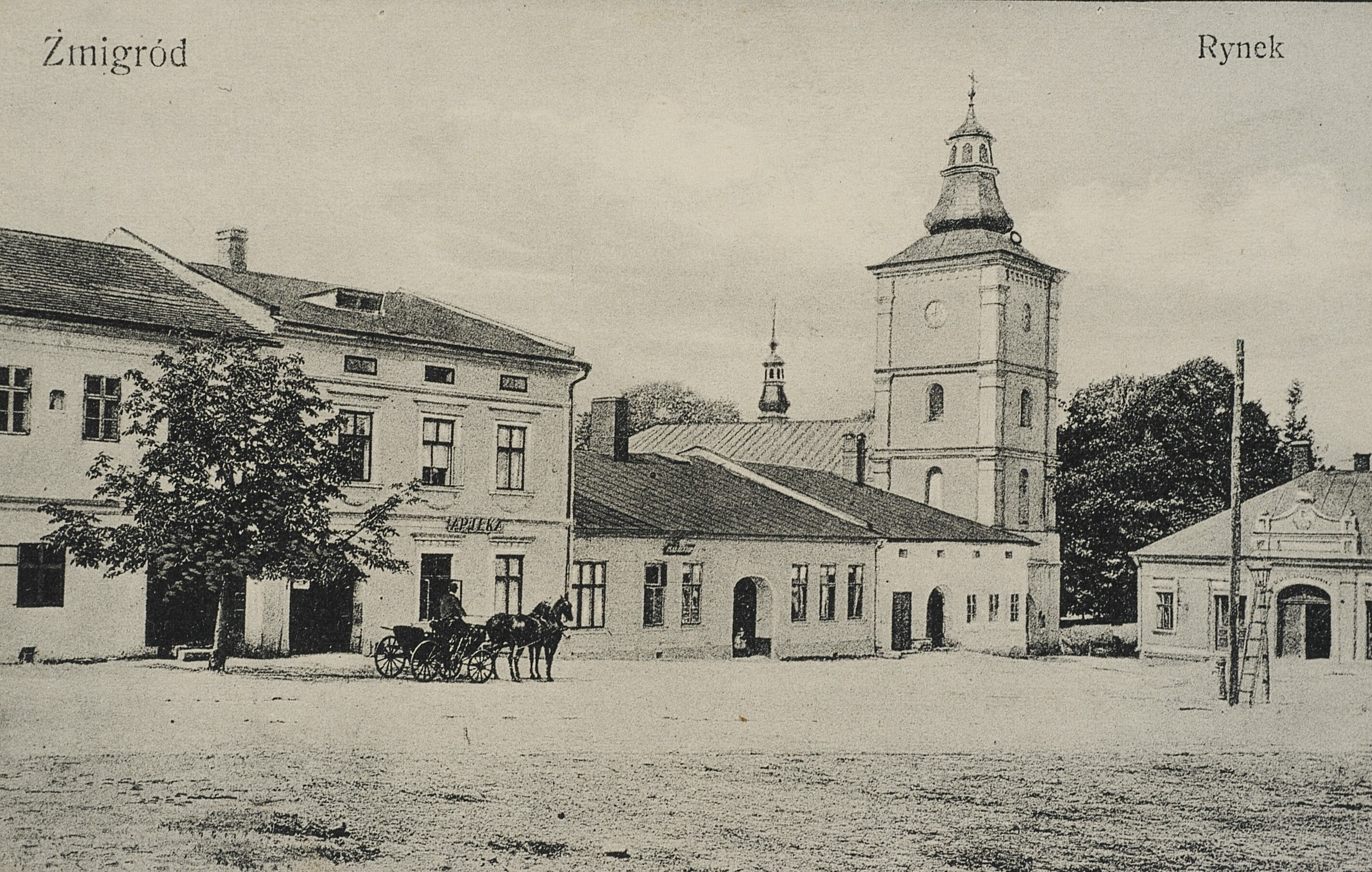
Market square, before 1910

Żmigród received Magdeburg rights during the 14th century. Situated on the commercial roads leading to Red Ruthenia in the east and the Kingdom of Hungary in the south, Żmigród owed its fast growth due to the wine trade, which brought wines to Poland from the Hungarian vineyards. In 1474, during the reign of Casimir IV Jagiellon, Żmigród was plundered and destroyed by the mercenary Black Army of Hungary led by Matthias Corvinus. The city survived two fires during the 16th century (1522 and 1577). Following the Partitions of Poland, from 1772 until 1918 Żmigród was part of the Galician territory of the Austro-Hungarian Empire and began to lose its financial base leading to population decline. Following mass emigration overseas in the course of World War I, Żmigród was stripped of its city status in 1919 soon after the rebirth of sovereign Poland. The name Nowy (New) was added following World War II.

The population of Żmigród in 1880 was about 2,508 people; in 1900: 2,289 and in 1921: 1,959. The main occupations of the Christian population were agriculture, manual trades and weaving.

=== Jewish community in Żmigród ===
The first information about Jews in Żmigród dates to 1410. Jews were permitted to settle throughout the city. One hundred years later, it already had a thriving Jewish community surpassing other communities in the area. A large two-storey synagogue (pictured) was built there in the 16th century. The Jewish community of Żmigród had under its jurisdiction other Jewish Kehillas including Jasło and Gorlice. The latter communities had to bring their dead for burial in the Żmigród cemetery. Eventually Gorlice and Jasło grew and gained their independence from Żmigród. The community flourished from the end of the 16th century until the middle of the 18th century. The post of rabbi in Żmigród carried great weight in the area. The community maintained a yeshiva headed in 1680 by Rabbi Avrohom. Between the years 1692 and 1695 the community (and the yeshiva) were headed by Rabbi Menachem Mendl. He was followed by Rabbi Benyamin Zeev Wolf Rimner in 1698. On his death in 1721, the position was given to Rabbi Avrohom Shor, who was succeeded by Rabbi Yehoshua Heshl Blumenfeld in 1770.

The community in Żmigród suffered greatly as a result of the Cossack and Swedish invasions, and had to borrow money during the second half of the 17th century in order to survive. In 1694, the Jewish community borrowed 125 thaler from the bishop of Krosno but was unable to repay it until 1785. In 1765, about 1,243 Jews lived in the villages surrounding Żmigród. The total Jewish population of the city and the neighboring areas consisted of 1,926 people. Statistics indicate that there were 159 Jewish breadwinners. The Jews owned 67 houses that were very crowded, with some of them occupied by as many as six families. Upon the partition of the Polish–Lithuanian Commonwealth in 1772, according to Austrian report of 1781, most of the Jews of Żmigród were in the lowest tax bracket. They were ordered to resettle in 1791. The community undertook to resettle 17 families onto the land. Each family was to receive 250 florins. The plan was not very successful and only four families settled on the land by 1805. The Jewish community began to decline financially in the 19th century. Many of the Jewish residents began to leave the city and some even moved to Gorlice and Jasło. A decline of the Jewish population continued during the eighties and into the 20th century. The 1900 census counted 1,240 Jews in the city. A great exodus took place during World War I, when many of the Jews of Żmigród left for overseas.

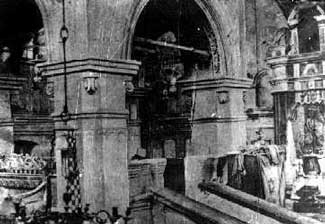
Żmigród Synagogue burned to the ground by Nazi Germans in 1939. Old postcard

Most Jews in Żmigród were Hasidic, largely following the Sanzer Rov, Rabbi Chaim Halberstam. They were influential in ensuring that the next incumbent as Rabbi of Żmigród was Benyamin Zeev, a Sanzer chosid. He died in 1902 and was succeeded by Rabbi Mordechai Dovid Unger, a brother-in-law of the Sanzer Rov. He was succeeded in turn by his son-in-law Rabbi Osher Yeshayahu Rubin, a grandson of the Sanzer Rov, who later became the Zhmigrider Rebbe in Sanz. In 1907, another grandson of the Sanzer Rov, Rabbi Sinai Halberstam, was appointed as Rabbi of Żmigród and served the community until 1939 (he died in Siberia, Russia). After Żmigród lost its city status in 1919, the Jewish population dropped to 800 people by 1939. The Gemilat Hessed fund established with the help of the American Jewish Joint Distribution Committee in 1927, distributed 30 loans of 3,000 złotych each in 1929, but faced closure in 1938 due to lack of money. Former residents of Żmigród in the US kept the fund going.

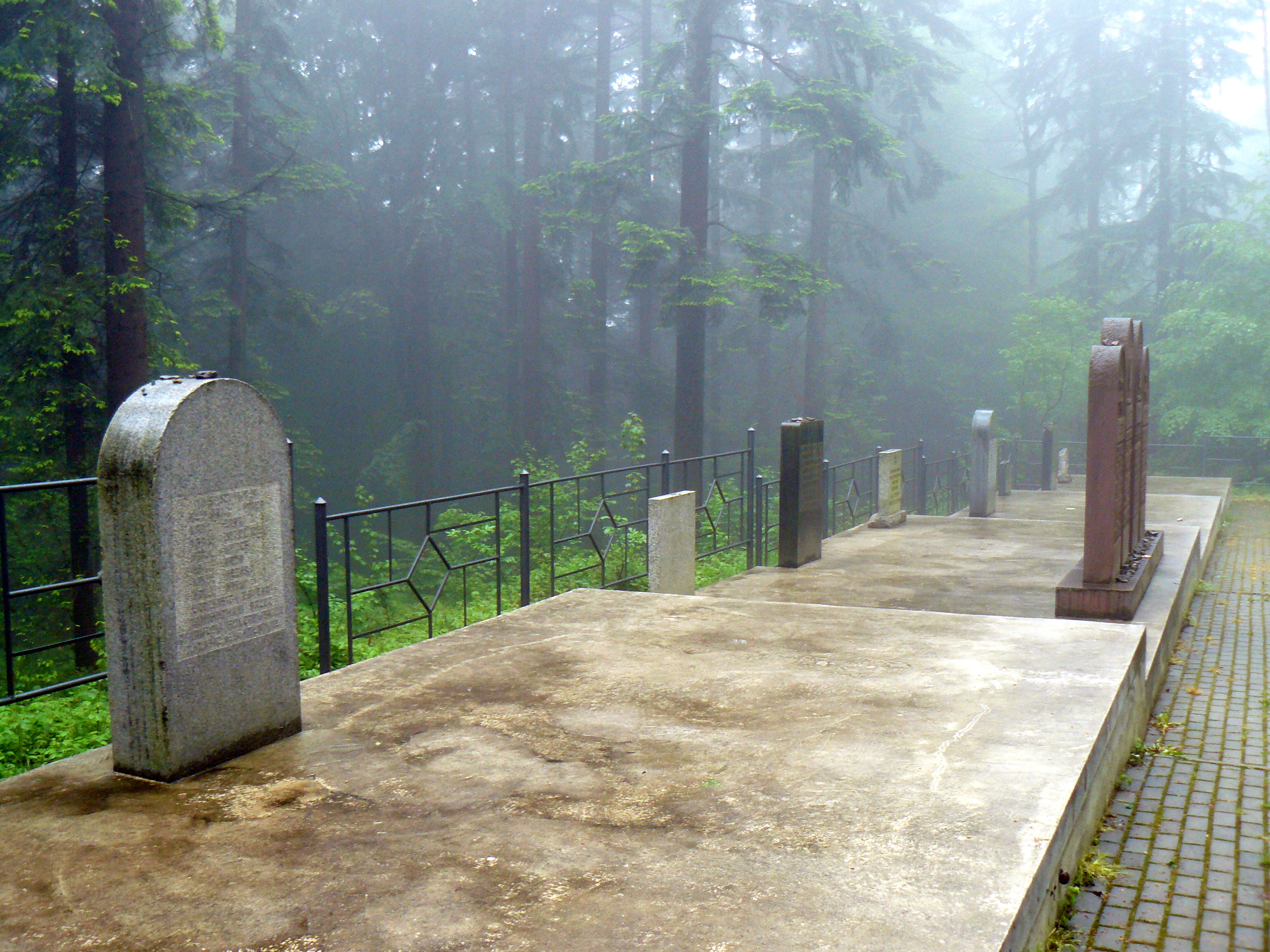
Jewish mass murder place in the woods by Nowy Żmigród

With the outbreak of World War II, many Jews fled across the San river to the Soviet occupation zone, but most of them soon returned home. Some of those who went east were soon rounded up by the Soviet NKVD and deported to the interior of the country in 1940. As soon as the Germans occupied Nowy Żmigród, orders aimed at the Jews began to appear. Jews were not allowed to travel, had to wear armbands and were forced to contribute money and forced labor. In 1940, many Jews from the area were transported to Nowy Żmigród from as far away as Łódź. The Judenrat and the J.S.S. (Jewish Self Help) local committee provided lodgings, clothing and medical assistance for the new arrivals. Jews received meals from the public kitchen. Early in 1942, a ghetto was established in Nowy Żmigród. More Jews were forced to move into the community from nearby villages. The Jewish population reached 2,000 people with an unbelievable level of overcrowding.

On 7 July 1942 all the Jews were ordered to assemble in the square whereupon they were surrounded by the German and auxiliary police units. Women, children, sick and elderly people were separated from the able-bodied. The latter were directed to a table where representatives of the various German firms issued them work permits. These were then directed to a separate corner of the square. A blanket was spread in the square and the Jews were forced to deposit all their valuable possessions. On the day of the round up, the head of the Judenrat, Hersh Eisenberg, was murdered by the Germans under the pretext that he did not pay the requested contribution. Three other people were killed with him including his two children. After hours of waiting, 1,250 Jews were led to the forest of Halbow where they were killed into prepared execution pits. Some of the survivors of the round-up were sent, on 15 August 1942, to the Zasław labor camp near Kraków. Another group of survivors were sent to the Płaszów death camp. The last remnants of the Jewish population were then sent to the Bełżec death camp at the end of the summer in 1942.

== See also ==
- Walddeutsche, Germans who settled on the territory of Sanockie Pits
- Lendians, a Lechitic Wends who inhabited the East Lesser Poland
- Great Moravia
- Ostsiedlung
- Galicia (Eastern Europe)
- Pogórzanie of the Central Beskidian Range of the Podkarpacie highlands
