= Magura National Park =

National park of Poland

Coordinates: 49°031′N 21°031′E

- Magurski Park Narodowy
- IUCN category II (national park)
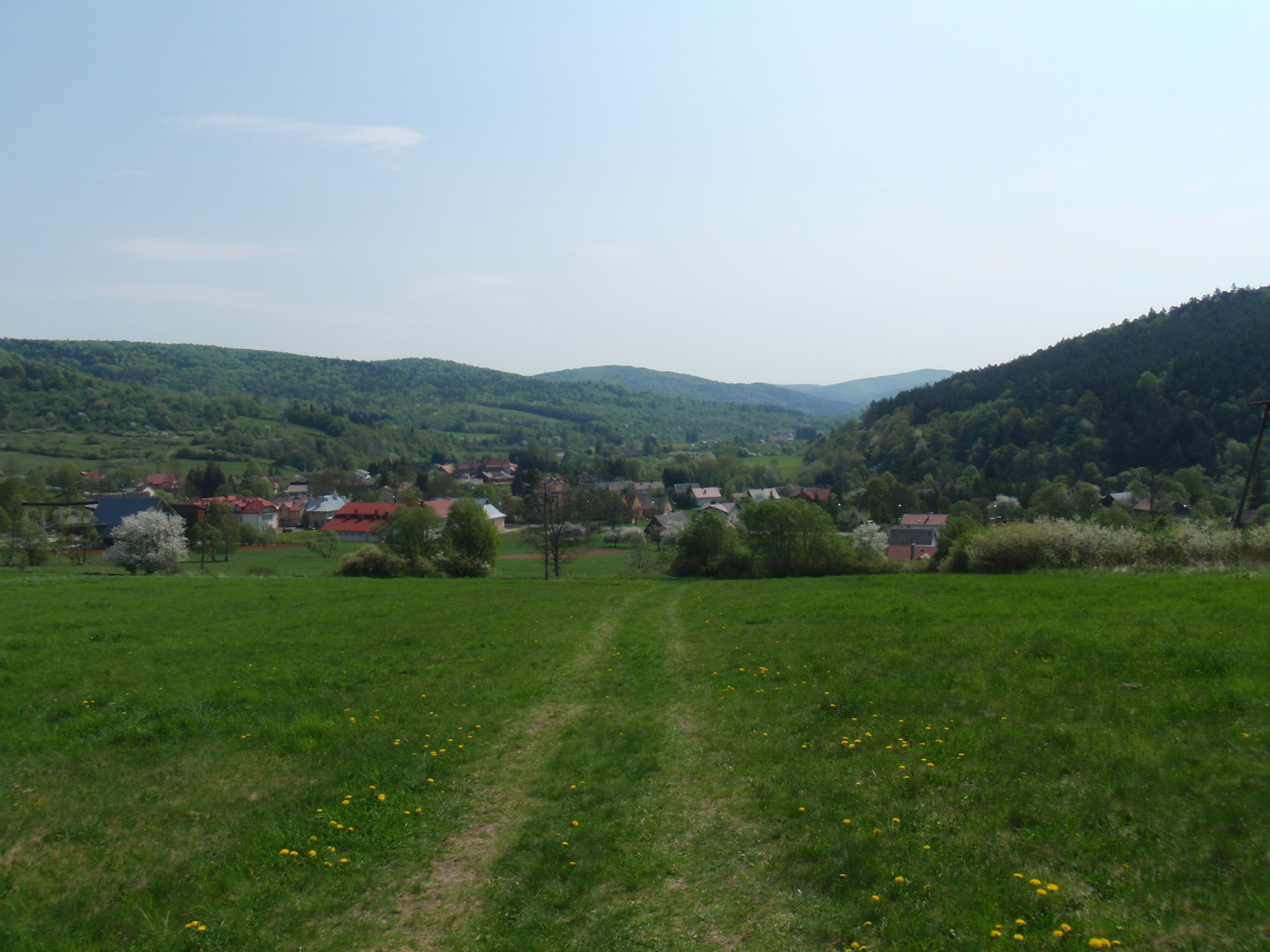
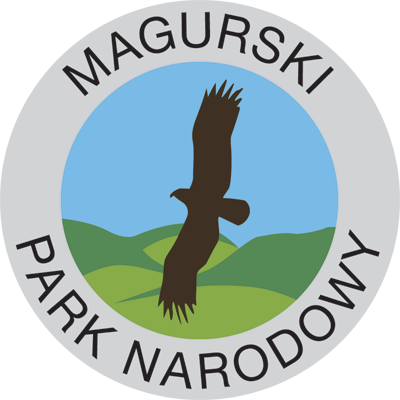
- View towards Krempna Park logo with Buzzard
- Interactive map of Magura National Park
- Location: Subcarpathian Voivodeship, Poland
- Nearest city: Krempna
- Area: 194.39 km^{2} (75.05 sq mi)
- Established: 1995
- Governing body: Ministry of the Environment
- Website: Official website

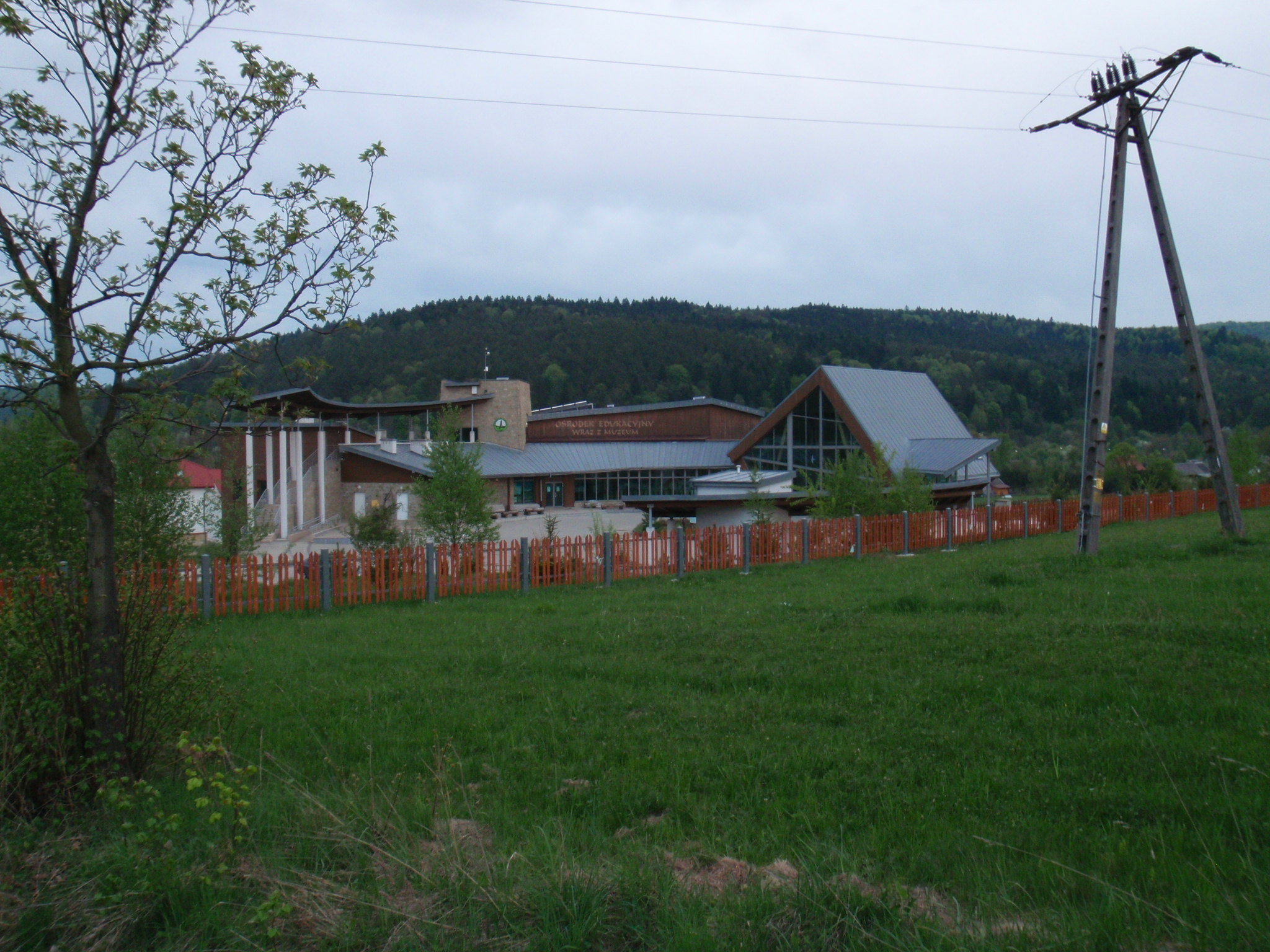
Park headquarters

Magura National Park (Polish: Magurski Park Narodowy) is a National Park located in the south-east of Poland, close to Slovakia, on the boundary of Lesser Poland Voivodeship and Subcarpathian Voivodeship. It covers the main part of the upper basin of the Wisłoka river. When the park was created in 1995 it covered 199.62 km^{2}, although it is now only 194.39 km^{2} (75.05 sq mi), of which 185.31 km^{2} is forest.

The park takes its name from the massif known as Magura Wątkowska, after Wątkowa, its highest peak. Magura is also the name of the second-highest peak of this massif.

== The landscape ==
Magurski National Park's landscape is typical of the Beskid Niski ridge and consists mainly of heavily forested low and medium peaks. The park features fancifully sculpted rocks. The huge Devil's Rock wrapped in mystery is the most prominent among these rock formations. The main part of the park consists of the Magura Wątkowska massif, with its highest peak Wątkowa at 847 metres (2,779 ft) above sea level. Other significant hills are Magura (842 m), Wielka Góra (719 m) and Nad Tysowym (713 m).

The Wisłoka river and its tributaries are some of the most important elements of the park. The Wisłoka is a typical mountain river, which creates picturesque ravines and frequently changes its course.

The Kornuty nature reserve is located at the heart of the park, protecting the constellations of its fancifully sculpted sandstones. Their unusual shapes are due to erosion. The rocks conceal numerous fracture caves, including the best known Mroczna [Murky] Cave, whose corridors are 200 metres long.

== Flora and fauna ==
Plant life is of a transitional character and reflects the park's location - between the Eastern and Western Carpathians. The majority of the park is forest. Spruce is not frequent here, which means that the woodland is for the most part natural.

The park is rich in animal life - there are 137 species of birds, including several endangered such as the eagle and eagle-owl as well as the stork. There are also 35 endangered mammal species including the brown bear (they roam back and forth between Poland and Slovakia), Eurasian lynx, European wildcat, gray wolf and Eurasian otter. One can also find fish, snakes, salamanders and numerous insects. It is estimated that within the park there are 200 species of endangered animals.

== Human settlement ==
The oldest trace of human settlement in this area are remains of a stronghold at Brzezowa, on the Walik mountain. It was part of the system of strongholds built by the Wislanie tribe in the 9th century on the Southern border of their lands. Also, one can find small, wooden Orthodox churches, which were built by the eastern Slavic Lemkos. Unfortunately, some of these buildings are ruined. In one of the farmers’ huts, at the village of Kolonia Olchowiec, there is a small, private museum of Lemko culture.

There are also numerous cemeteries from World War I, as this area was for a long time a battleground between the Russian and Austro-German armies. A tragic reminder of World War II is the cemetery of 1250 Jews, who were killed by the Nazis in 1942 at the Halbów pass.

The park has its headquarters in the village of Krempna.
