= Krajowice =

- Village
- Location within Poland
- Coordinates: 49°46′44″N 21°26′25″E
- Country: Poland
- Voivodeship: Subcarpathian
- County: Jasło
- Gmina: Kołaczyce

Krajowice [krajɔˈvit͡sɛ] is a village in the administrative district of Gmina Kołaczyce, within Jasło County, Subcarpathian Voivodeship, in south-eastern Poland.

The village has a school and catholic laity attend the Parish of St. Jude in the neighbouring village of Dąbrówka.

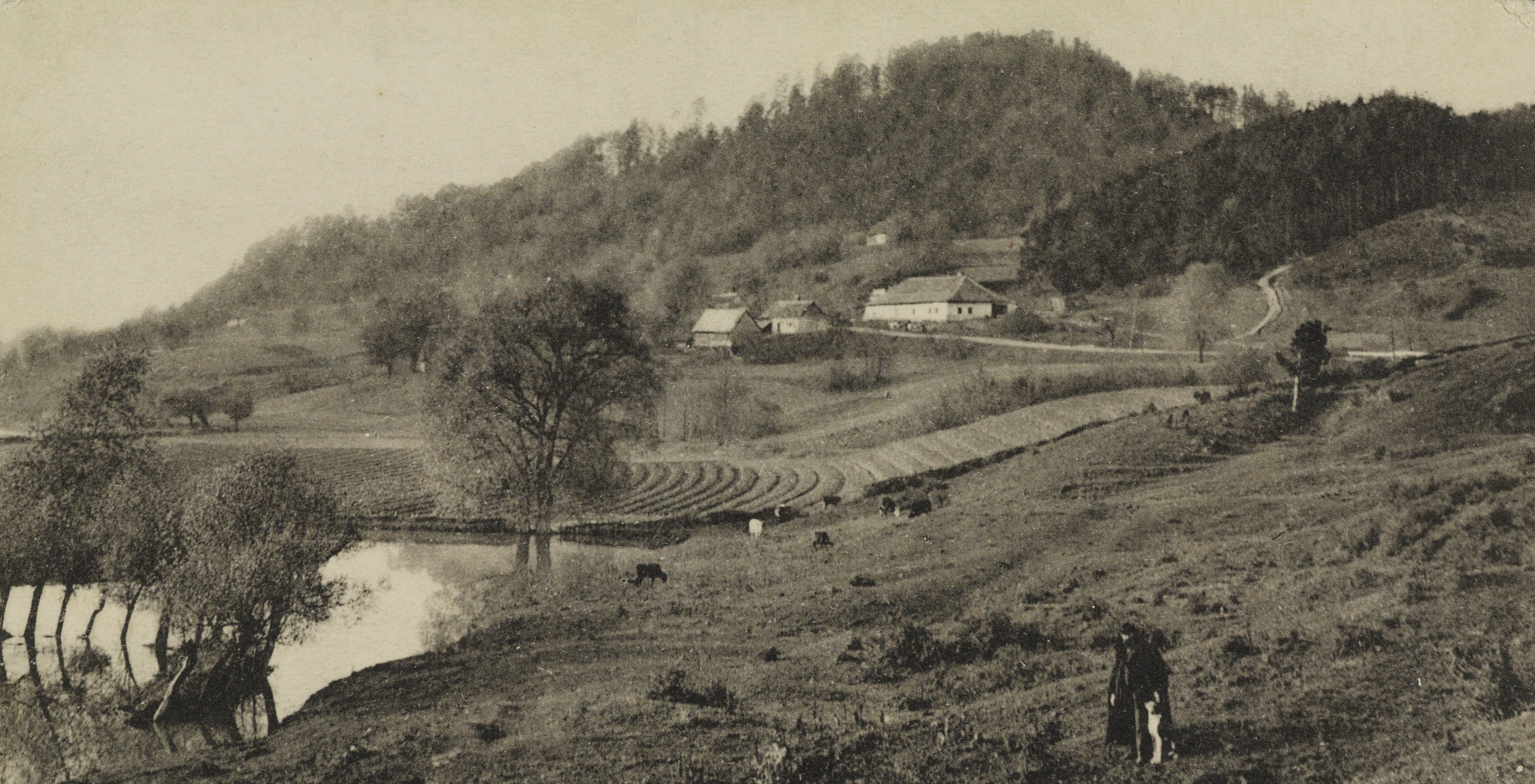
General view, 1900-1904

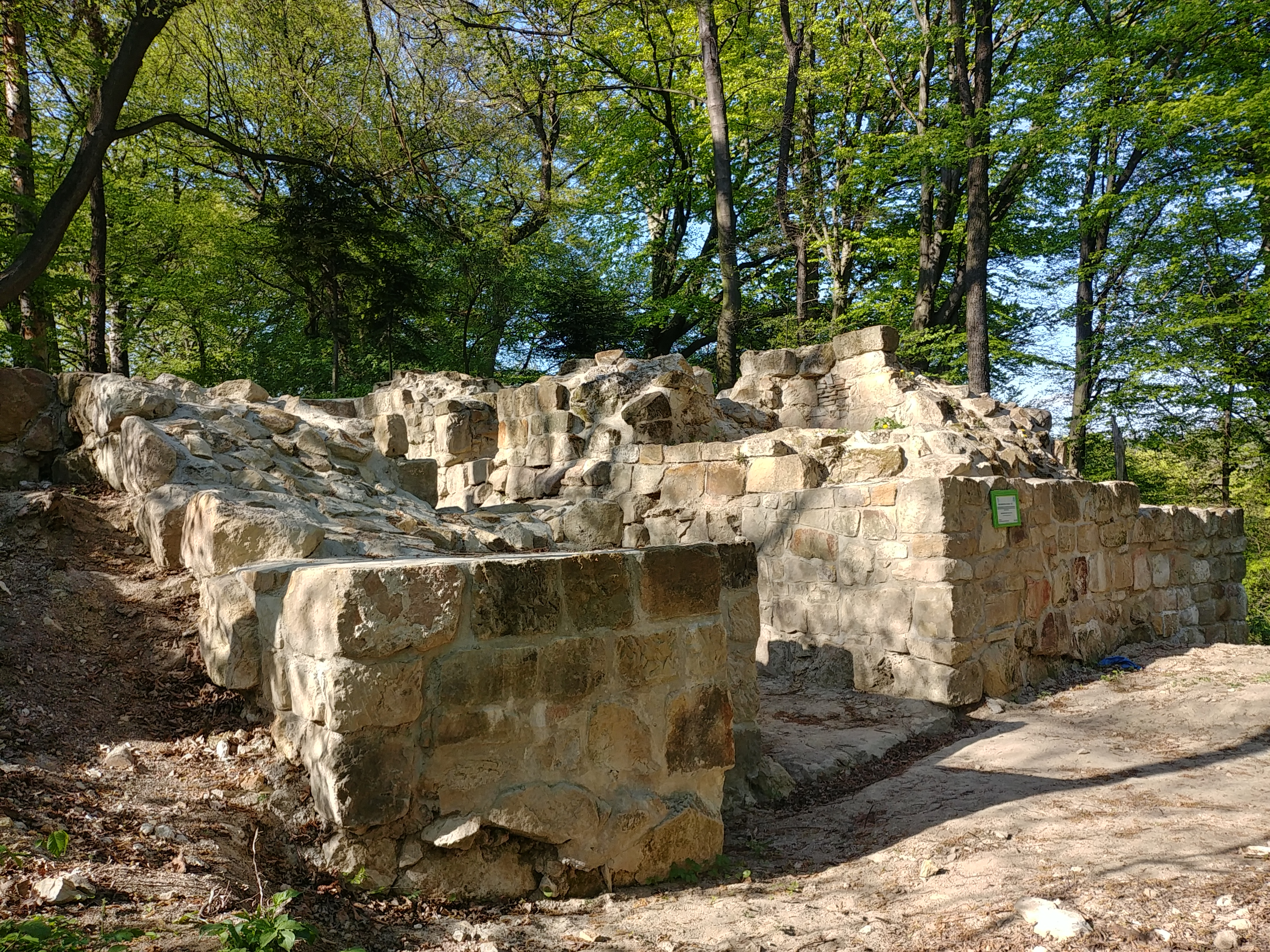
Ruins of the castle Golesz in Krajowice
