= Pielgrzymka, Podkarpackie Voivodeship =

Pielgrzymka
- Village
- Location within Poland
- Coordinates: 49°37′N 21°27′E
- Country: Poland
- Voivodeship: Subcarpathian
- County: Jasło
- Gmina: Osiek Jasielski

Pielgrzymka [pʲɛlˈɡʐɨmka] is a village in the administrative district of Gmina Osiek Jasielski in Jasło County, Subcarpathian Voivodeship, located in south-eastern Poland. It is approximately 4 km (2 mi) south-west of Osiek Jasielski, 15 km (9 mi) south of Jasło, and 62 km (39 mi) south-west of the regional capital Rzeszów.
