= Opacie =

- Village
- Location within Poland
- Coordinates: 49°46′N 21°24′E
- Country: Poland
- Voivodeship: Subcarpathian
- County: Jasło
- Gmina: Jasło

Opacie [ɔˈpat͡ɕɛ] is a village in the administrative district of Gmina Jasło, within Jasło County, Subcarpathian Voivodeship, in south-eastern Poland.

The village has a school and a folk house. It borders Trzcinica to the south, Jasło to the west, Przysieki to the south west, Bączal Dolny to the north and Dąbrówka to the north west.
