= Brzezówka =

Brzezówka may refer to several villages in Poland:

- Brzezówka, Kolbuszowa County in Subcarpathian Voivodeship (south-east Poland)
- Brzezówka, Jasło County in Subcarpathian Voivodeship (south-east Poland)
- Brzezówka, Ropczyce-Sędziszów County in Subcarpathian Voivodeship (south-east Poland)
- Brzezówka, Rzeszów County in Subcarpathian Voivodeship (south-east Poland)
- Brzezówka, Silesian Voivodeship (south Poland)
- Brzezówka, Lesser Poland Voivodeship (south Poland)
