= Sieklówka =

- Village
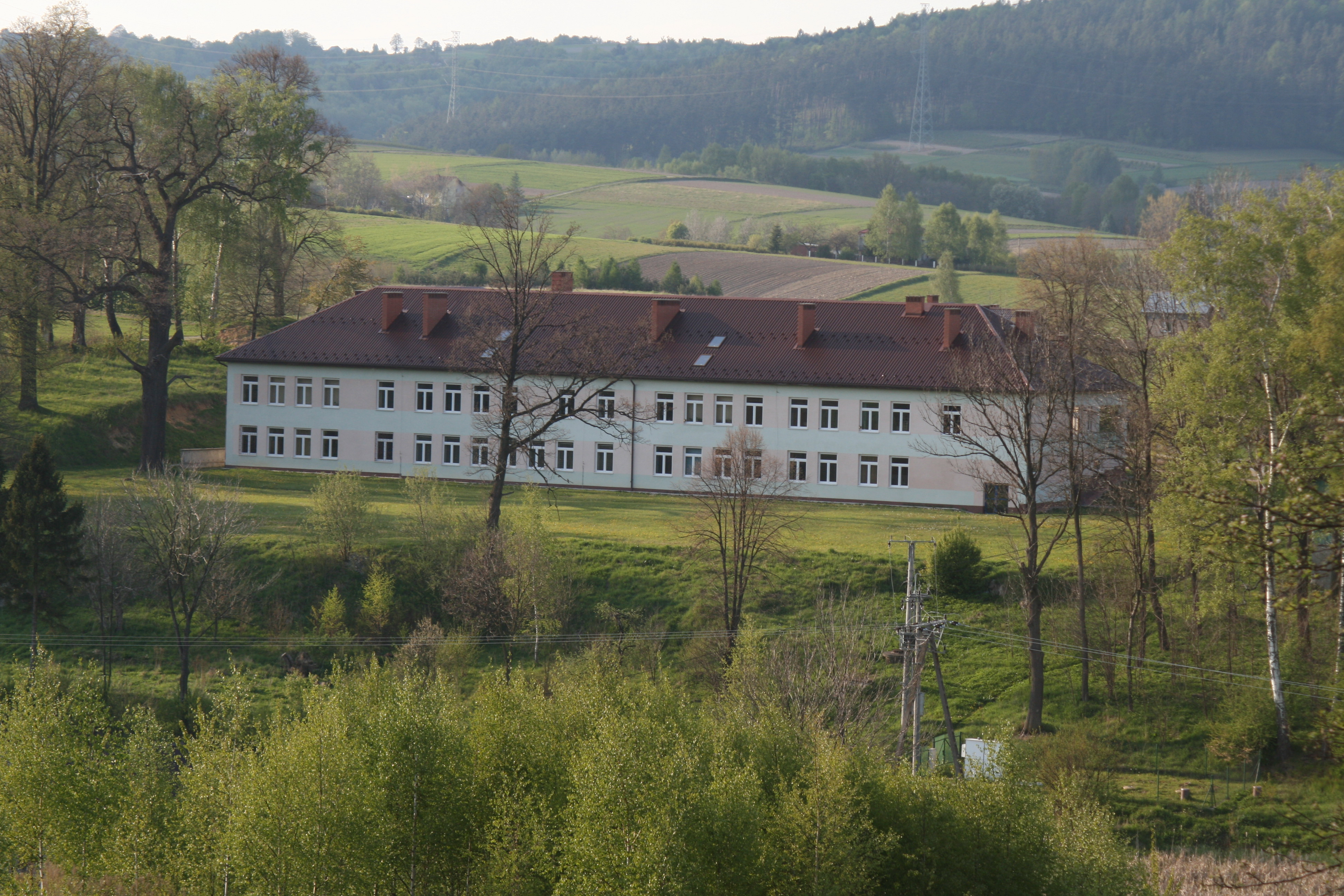
- School in Sieklówka

- Location within Poland
- Coordinates: 49°48′N 21°33′E
- Country: Poland
- Voivodeship: Subcarpathian
- County: Jasło
- Gmina: Kołaczyce
- Time zone: UTC+1 (CET)
  - Summer (DST): UTC+2 (CEST)
- Vehicle registration: RJS

Sieklówka [ɕɛˈklufka] is a village in the administrative district of Gmina Kołaczyce, within Jasło County, Subcarpathian Voivodeship, in south-eastern Poland.

During the German occupation of Poland (World War II), in December 1939 and January 1940, the Germans carried out massacres of 93 Poles, who previously tried to cross the border to find refuge in Hungary and then were imprisoned in Jasło (see also: Nazi crimes against the Polish nation).
