= Łubno Szlacheckie =

- Village
- Location within Poland
- Coordinates: 49°40′N 21°35′E
- Country: Poland
- Voivodeship: Subcarpathian
- County: Jasło
- Gmina: Tarnowiec
- Population: 440

Łubno Szlacheckie [ˈwubnɔ ʂlaˈxɛt͡skʲɛ] is a village in the administrative district of Gmina Tarnowiec, within Jasło County, Subcarpathian Voivodeship, in south-eastern Poland.
