= Nowy Glinik =

- Village
- Location within Poland
- Coordinates: 49°41′11″N 21°31′18″E
- Country: Poland
- Voivodeship: Subcarpathian
- County: Jasło
- Gmina: Tarnowiec
- Highest elevation: 350 m (1,150 ft)
- Lowest elevation: 280 m (920 ft)
- Population: 673

Nowy Glinik [ˈnɔvɨ ˈɡlinik] is a village in the administrative district of Gmina Tarnowiec, within Jasło County, Subcarpathian Voivodeship, in south-eastern Poland.
