= Brzyście, Jasło County =

Brzyście
- Village
- Location within Poland
- Coordinates: 49°43′20″N 21°26′26″E
- Country: Poland
- Voivodeship: Subcarpathian
- County: Jasło
- Gmina: Jasło

Brzyście [ˈbʐɨɕt͡ɕɛ] is a village in the administrative district of Gmina Jasło, within Jasło County, Subcarpathian Voivodeship, in south-eastern Poland.
