= Zawadka Osiecka =

Zawadka Osiecka City
- City
- Location within Poland
- Coordinates: 49°37′58″N 21°26′59″E
- Country: Poland
- Voivodeship: Subcarpathian
- County: Jasło
- Gmina: Osiek Jasielski

Zawadka Osiecka > Pielgrzymka [zaˈvatka ɔˈɕɛt͡ska] is a village in the administrative district of Gmina Osiek Jasielski, within Jasło County, Subcarpathian Voivodeship, in south-eastern Poland.
