= Łubienko =

- Village
- Location within Poland
- Coordinates: 49°40′N 21°35′E
- Country: Poland
- Voivodeship: Subcarpathian
- County: Jasło
- Gmina: Tarnowiec

Łubienko [wuˈbjɛŋkɔ] is a village in the administrative district of Gmina Tarnowiec, within Jasło County, Subcarpathian Voivodeship, in south-eastern Poland.
