= Wróblowa =

- Village
- Location within Poland
- Coordinates: 49°48′N 21°23′E
- Country: Poland
- Voivodeship: Subcarpathian
- County: Jasło
- Gmina: Brzyska

Wróblowa [vruˈblɔva] is a village in the administrative district of Gmina Brzyska, within Jasło County, Subcarpathian Voivodeship, in south-eastern Poland.
