= Kowalowy =

Villiage in Subcarpathian Voivodeship, Poland

- Village
- Location within Poland
- Coordinates: 49°47′N 21°29′E
- Country: Poland
- Voivodeship: Subcarpathian
- County: Jasło
- Gmina: Jasło

Kowalowy [kɔvaˈlɔvɨ] is a village in the administrative district of Gmina Jasło, within Jasło County, Subcarpathian Voivodeship, in south-eastern Poland.
