= Bierówka =

- Village
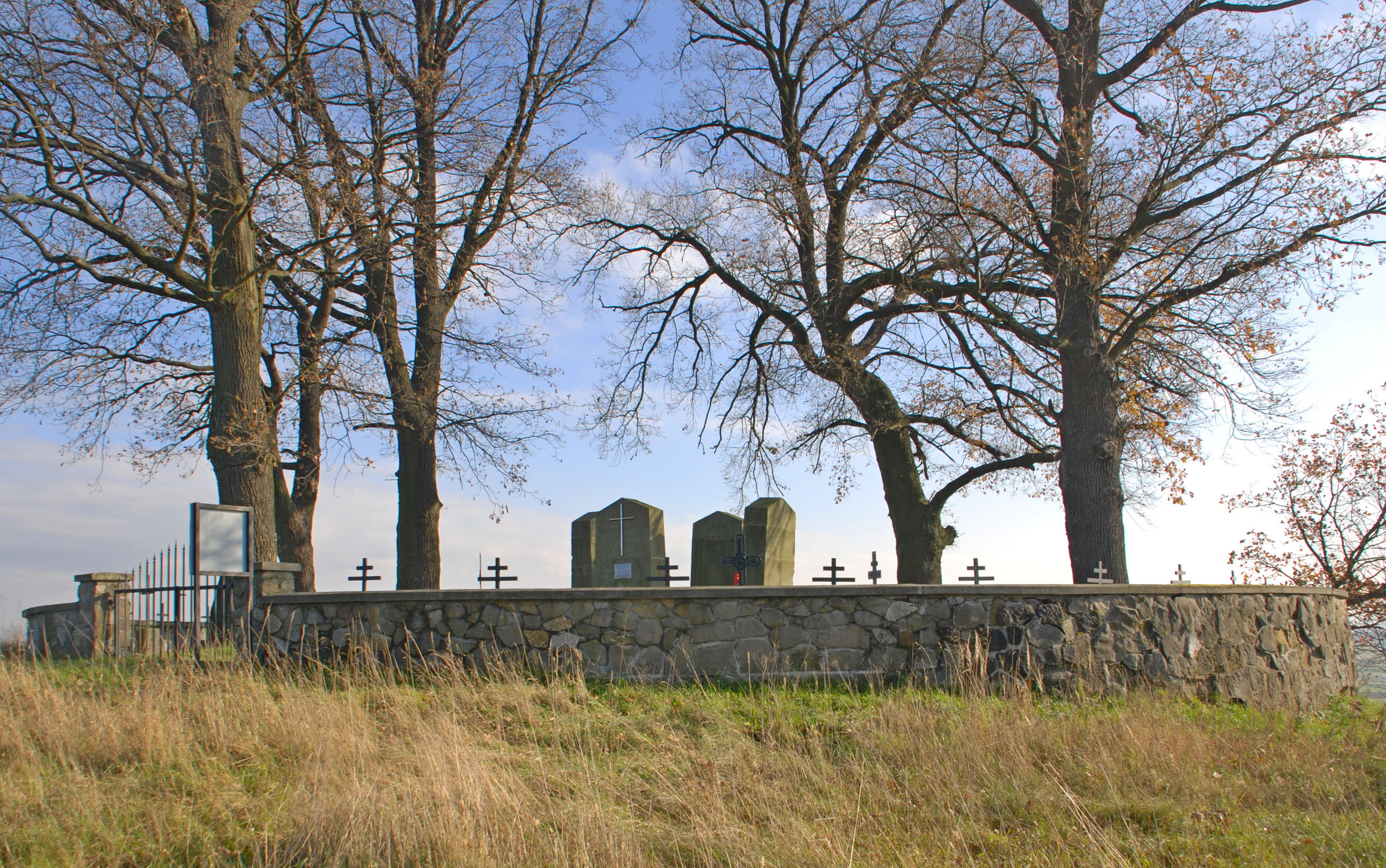
- War cemetery from 1915

- Location within Poland
- Coordinates: 49°47′N 21°35′E
- Country: Poland
- Voivodeship: Subcarpathian
- County: Jasło
- Gmina: Jasło

Bierówka [bjɛˈrufka] is a village in the administrative district of Gmina Jasło, within Jasło County, Subcarpathian Voivodeship, in south-eastern Poland.

== World War II ==
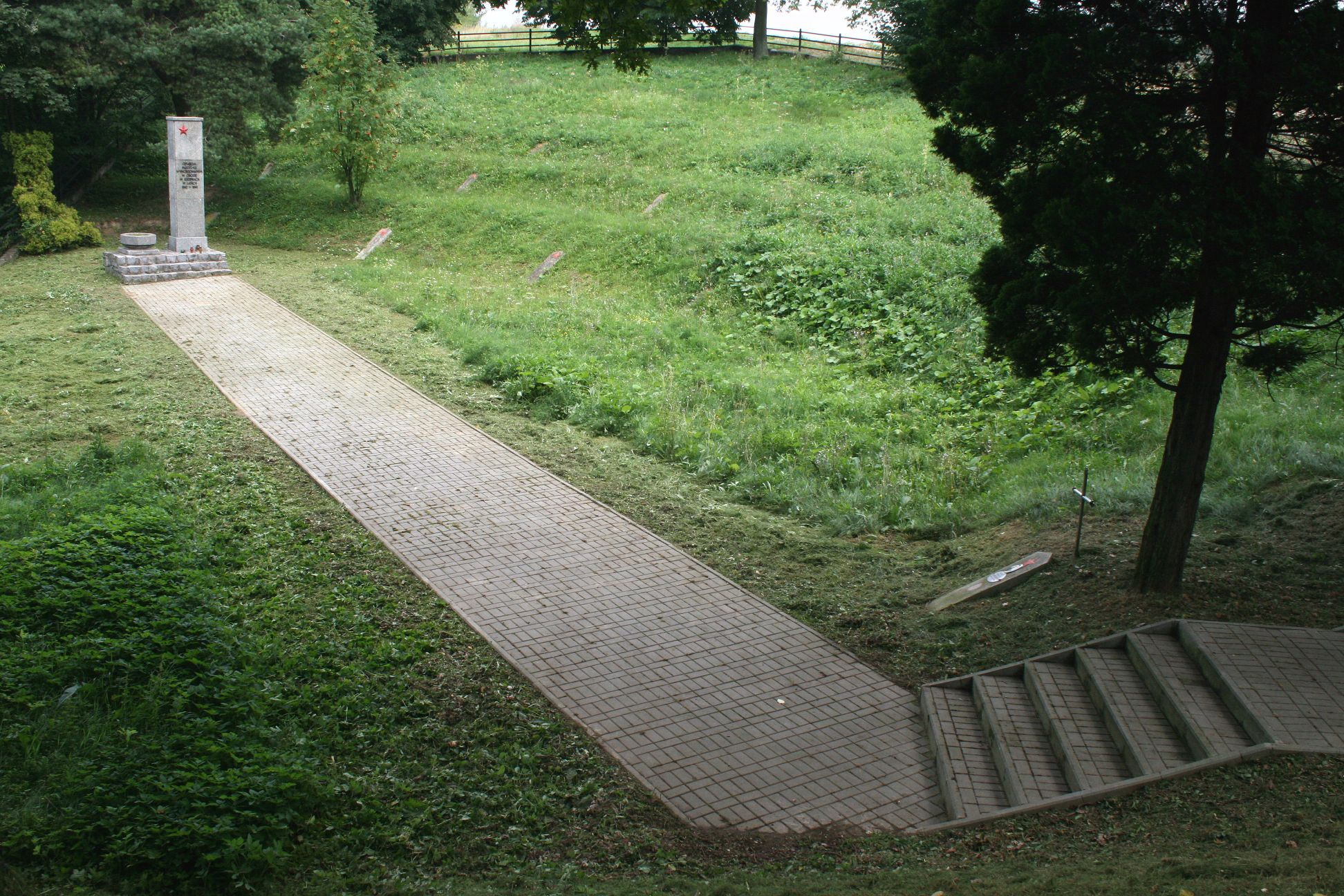
War cemetery at Bierowskie Doły (2008)

Bierówka is the location of World War II cemetery situated at Bierowskie Doły (pictured), with unmarked mass graves of prisoners of the Szebnie concentration camp nearby, covering the entire perimeter. Notably, the old monument mentions only the Soviet prisoners of war from Szebnie. Over the course of the camp's operation some 10,000 people perished there, including Soviet POWs, Polish Jews and non-Jewish Poles as well as Ukrainians and Romani people.

== See also ==
- World War II casualties of Poland
