= Szebnie =

- Village
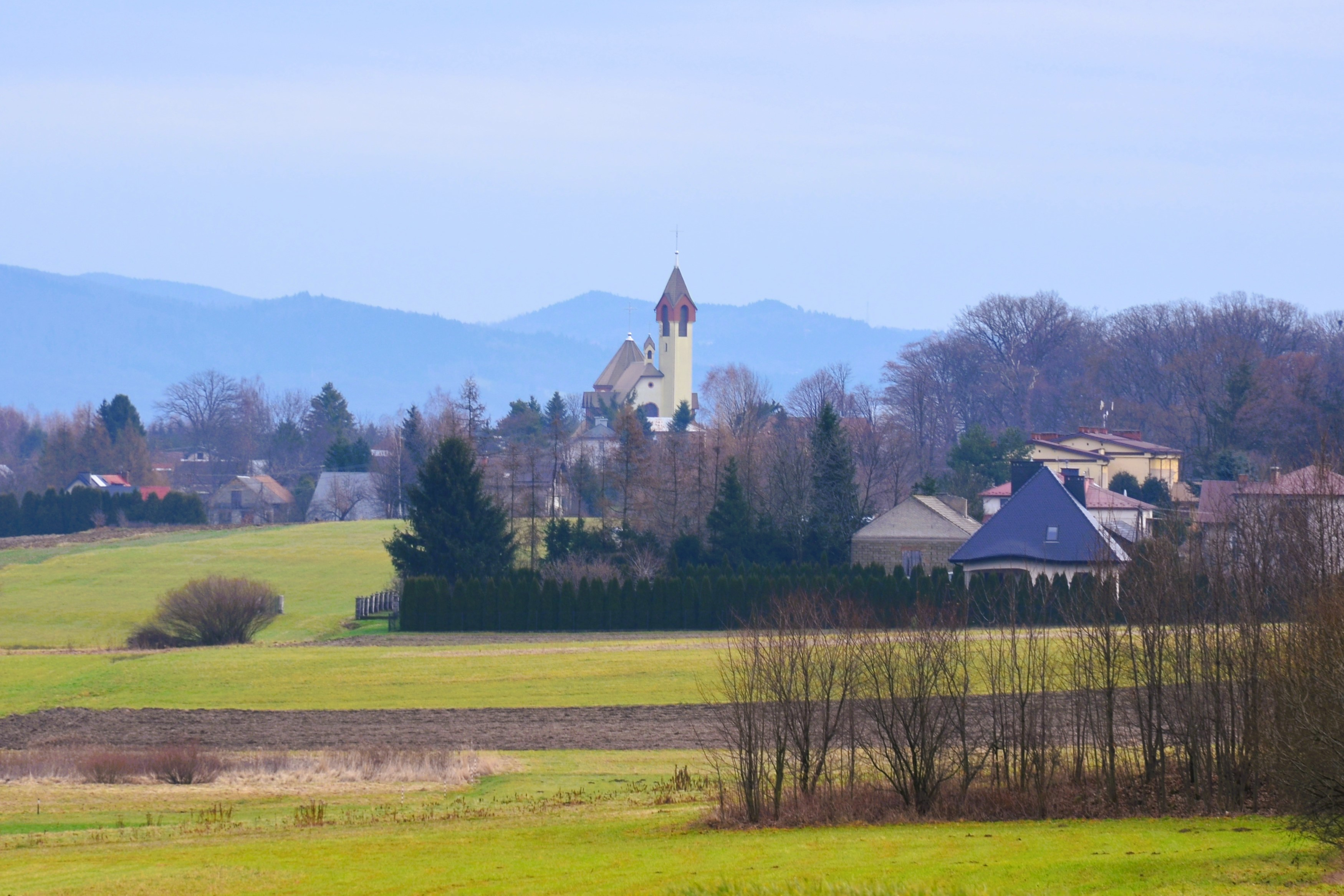

- Location within Poland
- Coordinates: 49°46′N 21°36′E
- Country: Poland
- Voivodeship: Subcarpathian
- County: Jasło
- Gmina: Jasło
- Time zone: UTC+1 (CET)
  - Summer (DST): UTC+2 (CEST)
- Vehicle registration: RJS

Szebnie [ˈʂɛbɲɛ] is a village in the administrative district of Gmina Jasło, within Jasło County, Subcarpathian Voivodeship, in south-eastern Poland.

== History ==
From 1789 to 1939, it was the seat of the Gorayski noble family, and there is a preserved historic manor house of the family in Szebnie.

=== World War II ===
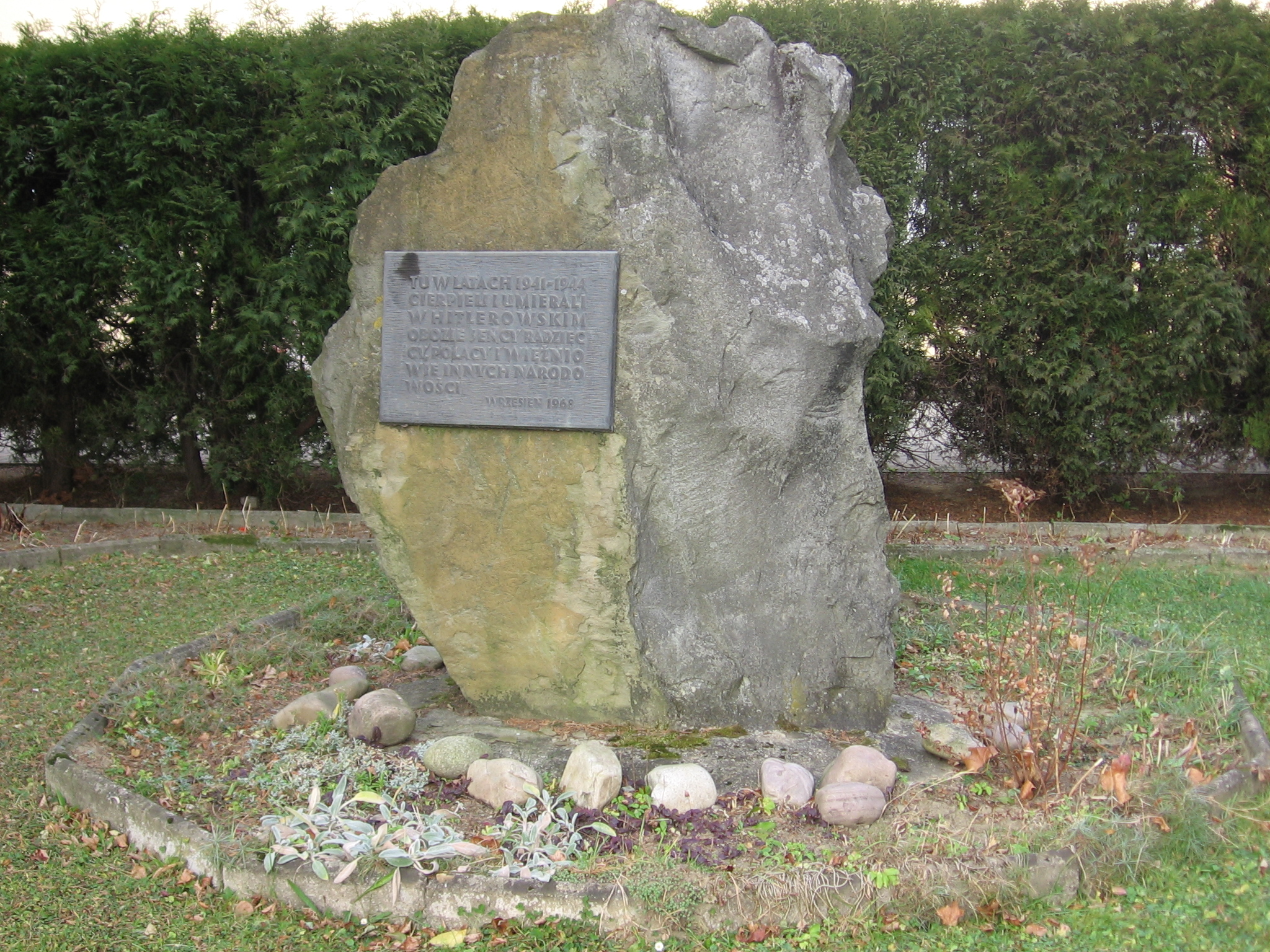
Memorial to the victims of the Szebnie concentration camp

The village was the location of the Szebnie concentration camp during German occupation of Poland in World War II. The facility was constructed in 1940 originally as horse stables for the Wehrmacht next to a manorial estate. Thousands of prisoners perished there over the course of the camp's operation, including Russian prisoners of war, Polish Jews and non-Jewish Poles as well as Ukrainians and Romani people. The charred remains of the camp were entered by the Soviets on 8 September 1944.

There was a SS training facility SS-Truppenübungsplatz Heidelager nearby at Pustków, for the Ukrainian 14th Waffen SS Division, as well as other collaborationists military formations. Their field training included killing operations at Szebnie.

From February 1944, Szebnie was also the location of the Stalag 325 prisoner-of-war camp relocated from Stryj, and it held mostly wounded POWs and invalids. The Polish resistance helped some 200 POWs escape from the camp. In July 1944, the Germans evacuated the camp, with 300 POWs left behind, and in September 1944 the camp was closed.
