= Sowina, Jasło County =

Sowina
- Village
- Location within Poland
- Coordinates: 49°49′41″N 21°28′15″E
- Country: Poland
- Voivodeship: Subcarpathian
- County: Jasło
- Gmina: Kołaczyce
- Elevation: 350 m (1,150 ft)
- Population: 1,000

Sowina [sɔˈvina] is a village in the administrative district of Gmina Kołaczyce, within Jasło County, Subcarpathian Voivodeship, in south-eastern Poland.
