= Zolkow =

Zolkow may refer to:

- Zölkow, a municipality in northern Germany
- Żółków, Greater Poland Voivodeship, west-central Poland
- Żółków, Subcarpathian Voivodeship, south-east Poland
