= Bieździedza =

- Village
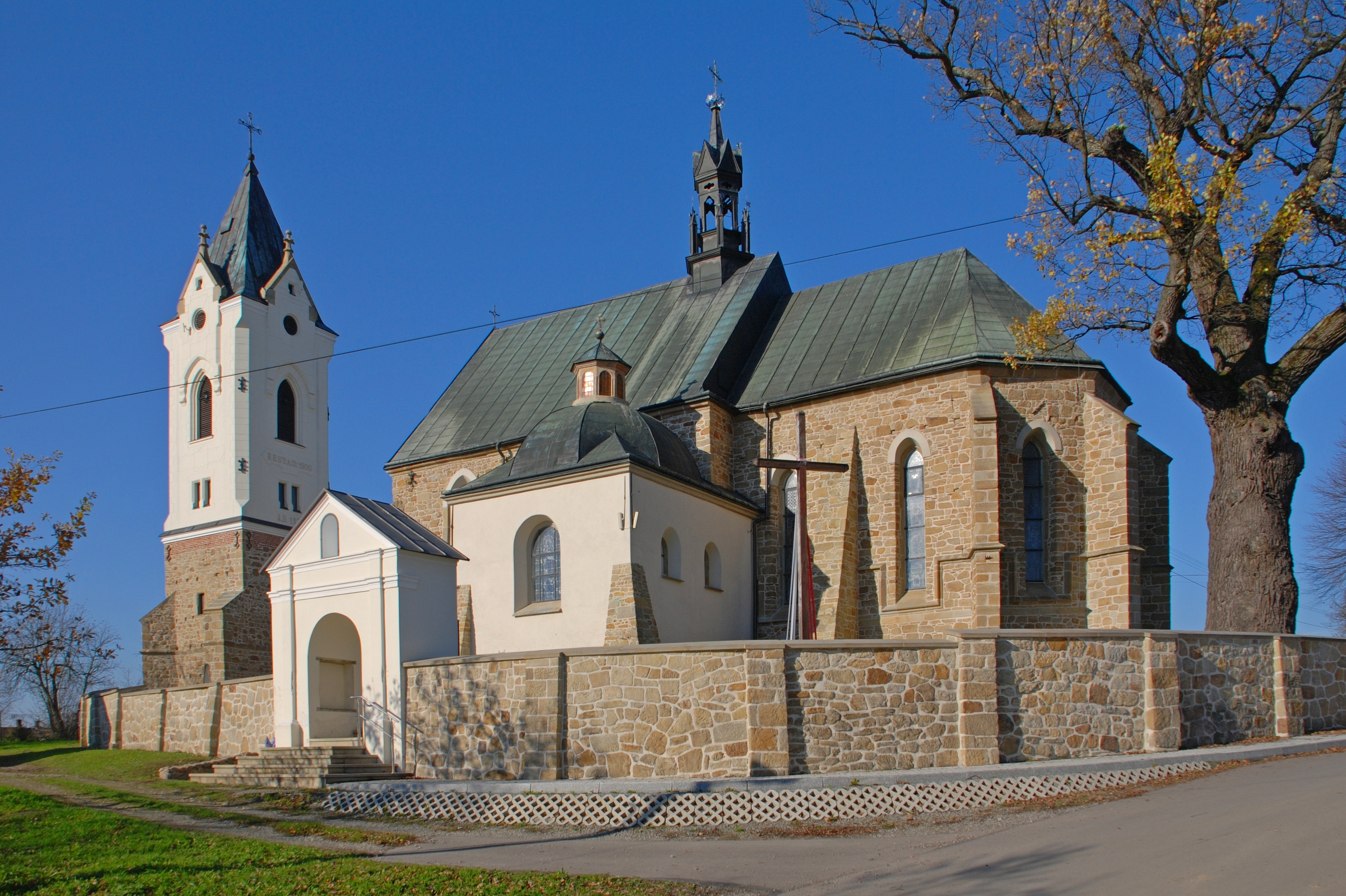
- Holy Trinity Church

- Location within Poland
- Coordinates: 49°49′N 21°30′E
- Country: Poland
- Voivodeship: Subcarpathian
- County: Jasło
- Gmina: Kołaczyce
- Population: 1,300

Bieździedza [bjɛʑˈd͡ʑɛd͡za] is a village in the administrative district of Gmina Kołaczyce, within Jasło County, Subcarpathian Voivodeship, in south-eastern Poland.
