= Kłodawa, Podkarpackie Voivodeship =

Kłodawa
- Village
- Location within Poland
- Coordinates: 49°48′50″N 21°24′52″E
- Country: Poland
- Voivodeship: Subcarpathian
- County: Jasło
- Gmina: Brzyska

Kłodawa [kwɔˈdava] is a village in the administrative district of Gmina Brzyska, within Jasło County, Subcarpathian Voivodeship, in south-eastern Poland.
