= Roztoki, Podkarpackie Voivodeship =

Roztoki
- Village
- Location within Poland
- Coordinates: 49°44′45″N 21°33′12″E
- Country: Poland
- Voivodeship: Subcarpathian
- County: Jasło
- Gmina: Tarnowiec

Roztoki [rɔsˈtɔki] is a village in the administrative district of Gmina Tarnowiec, within Jasło County, Subcarpathian Voivodeship, in south-eastern Poland.
