= Łaski, Jasło County =

Łaski
- Village
- Location within Poland
- Coordinates: 49°42′N 21°31′E
- Country: Poland
- Voivodeship: Subcarpathian
- County: Jasło
- Gmina: Jasło

Łaski [ˈwaski] is a village in the administrative district of Gmina Jasło, within Jasło County, Subcarpathian Voivodeship, in south-eastern Poland.
