= Gorajowice, Podkarpackie Voivodeship =

Gorajowice
- Village
- Location within Poland
- Coordinates: 49°46′N 21°30′E
- Country: Poland
- Voivodeship: Subcarpathian
- County: Jasło
- Gmina: Jasło

Gorajowice [ɡɔrajɔˈvit͡sɛ] is a village in the administrative district of Gmina Jasło, within Jasło County, Subcarpathian Voivodeship, in south-eastern Poland.
