= Jareniówka =

- Village
- Location within Poland
- Coordinates: 49°46′N 21°27′E
- Country: Poland
- Voivodeship: Subcarpathian
- County: Jasło
- Gmina: Jasło
- Elevation: 360 m (1,180 ft)
- Population (approx.): 1,000

Jareniówka [jarɛˈɲufka] is a village in the administrative district of Gmina Jasło, within Jasło County, Subcarpathian Voivodeship, in south-eastern Poland.
