= Bieździadka =

- Village
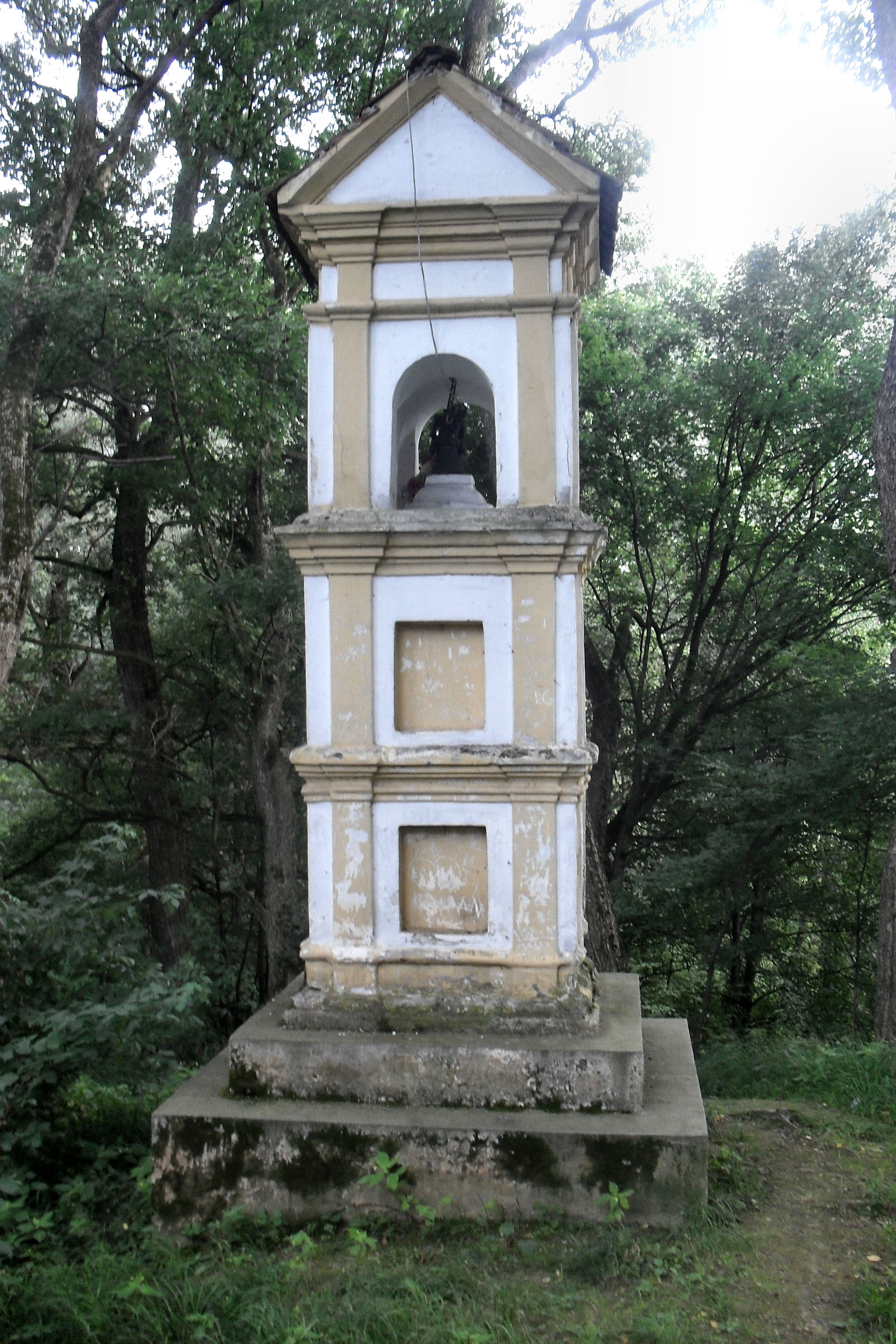

- Location within Poland
- Coordinates: 49°48′N 21°31′E
- Country: Poland
- Voivodeship: Subcarpathian
- County: Jasło
- Gmina: Kołaczyce
- Time zone: UTC+1 (CET)
  - Summer (DST): UTC+2 (CEST)
- Vehicle registration: RJS

Bieździadka [bjɛʑˈd͡ʑatka] is a village in the administrative district of Gmina Kołaczyce, within Jasło County, Subcarpathian Voivodeship, in south-eastern Poland.

Four Polish citizens were murdered by Nazi Germany in the village during World War II.
