= Osobnica =

- Village
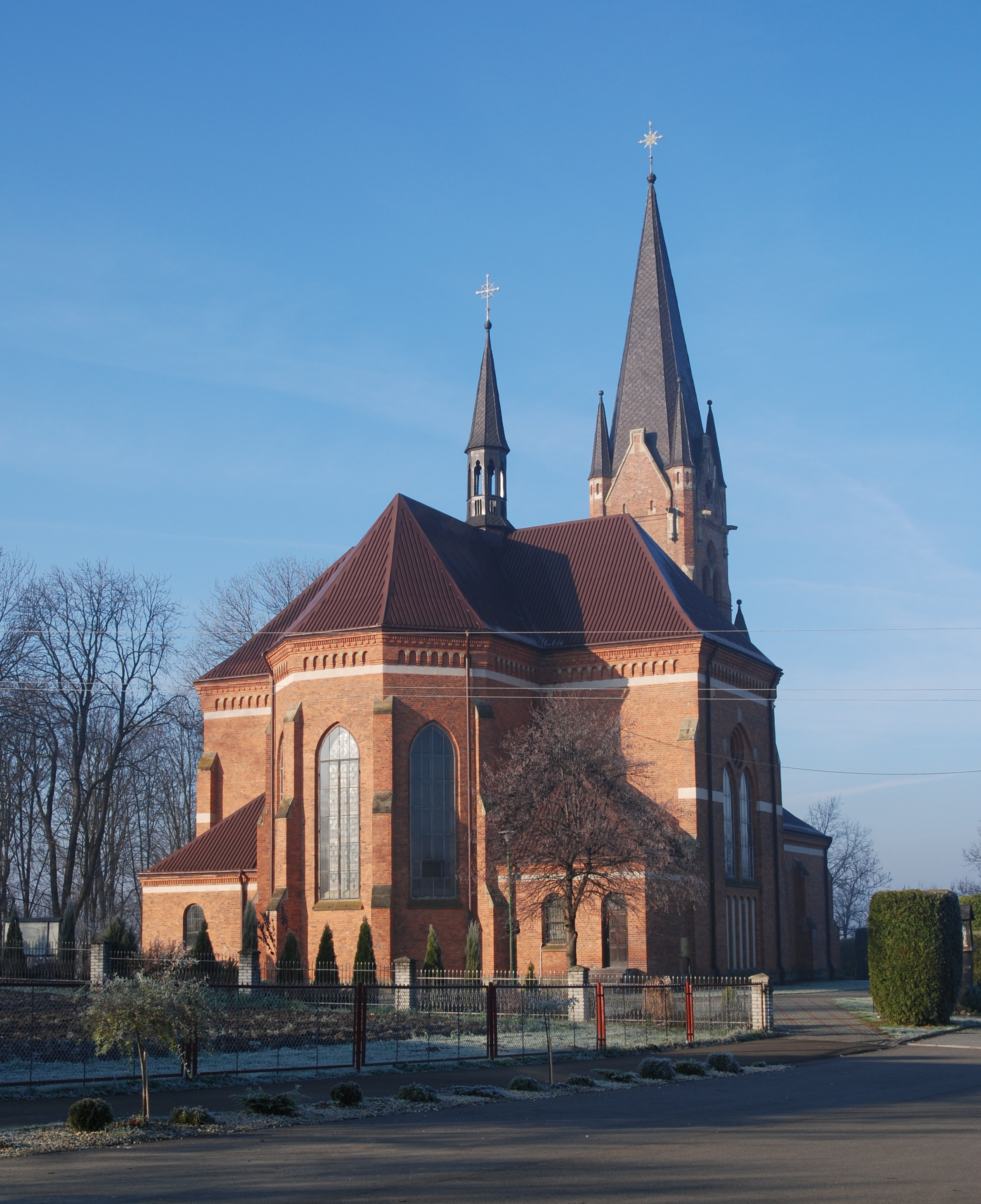
- Saints Stanislaus and Hedwig church in Osobnica

- Location within Poland
- Coordinates: 49°42′N 21°25′E
- Country: Poland
- Voivodeship: Subcarpathian
- County: Jasło
- Gmina: Jasło
- Population: 3,536

Osobnica [ɔsɔbˈnit͡sa] is a village in the administrative district of Gmina Jasło, within Jasło County, Subcarpathian Voivodeship, in south-eastern Poland.
