= Czekaj, Podkarpackie Voivodeship =

Czekaj
- Village
- Location within Poland
- Coordinates: 49°37′N 21°29′E
- Country: Poland
- Voivodeship: Subcarpathian
- County: Jasło
- Gmina: Osiek Jasielski

Czekaj [ˈt͡ʂɛkai̯] is a village, in the administrative district of Gmina Osiek Jasielski, within Jasło County, Subcarpathian Voivodeship, in south-eastern Poland.
