= Lublica =

- Village
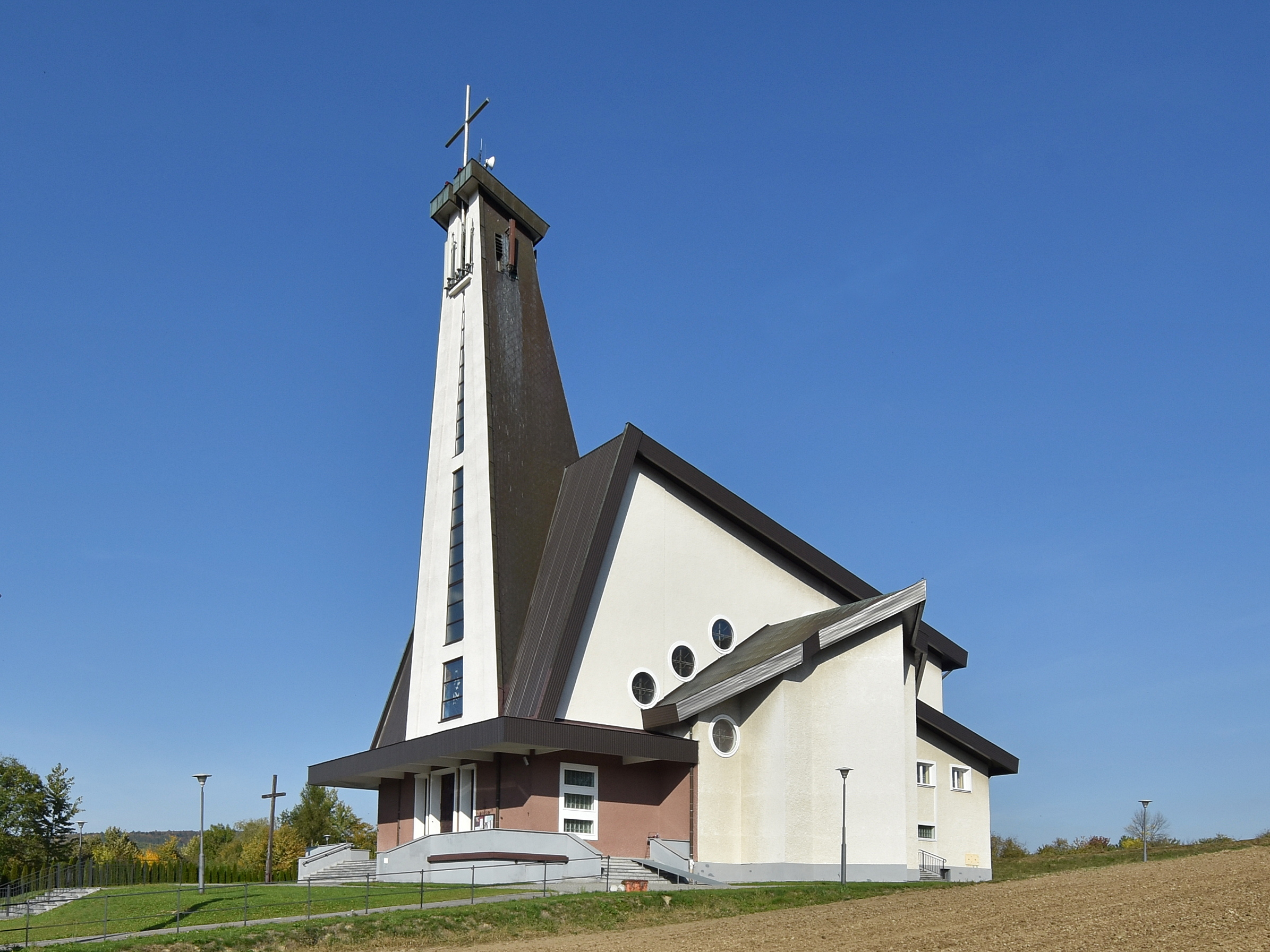
- Our Lady of Częstochowa church in Lublica

- Location within Poland
- Coordinates: 49°48′N 21°30′E
- Country: Poland
- Voivodeship: Subcarpathian
- County: Jasło
- Gmina: Kołaczyce

Population
  - Total: 688
- Time zone: UTC+1 (CET)
  - Summer (DST): UTC+2 (CEST)
- Vehicle registration: RJS

Lublica [luˈblit͡sa] is a village in the administrative district of Gmina Kołaczyce, within Jasło County, Subcarpathian Voivodeship, in south-eastern Poland.

Five Polish citizens were murdered by Nazi Germany in the village during World War II.
