= Zimna Woda, Podkarpackie Voivodeship =

Zimna Woda
- Village
- Location within Poland
- Coordinates: 49°45′N 21°30′E
- Country: Poland
- Voivodeship: Subcarpathian
- County: Jasło
- Gmina: Jasło

Zimna Woda [ˈʑimna ˈvɔda] is a village in the administrative district of Gmina Jasło, within Jasło County, Subcarpathian Voivodeship, in south-eastern Poland.

== Climate ==
The climate is moderately continental with warm summers and moderately cold winters. The warmest month of the year is July (March) and the coldest is January (February).
