= Dobrucowa =

- Village
- Location within Poland
- Coordinates: 49°45′N 21°35′E
- Country: Poland
- Voivodeship: Subcarpathian
- County: Jasło
- Gmina: Tarnowiec

Dobrucowa [dɔbruˈt͡sɔva] is a village in the administrative district of Gmina Tarnowiec, within Jasło County, Subcarpathian Voivodeship, in south-eastern Poland.

== World War II ==
Some two thousand Polish Jews were murdered in mass executions at the Dobrucowa Forest in the fall and winter of 1943, on the orders of SS-Hauptsturmführer Amon Göth from Płaszów. They were transported there from the Szebnie concentration camp during camp's murderous liquidation.
