= Samoklęski, Podkarpackie Voivodeship =

Samoklęski
- Village
- Location within Poland
- Coordinates: 49°36′N 21°28′E
- Country: Poland
- Voivodeship: Subcarpathian
- County: Jasło
- Gmina: Osiek Jasielski

Samoklęski [samɔˈklɛ̃ski] is a village in the administrative district of Gmina Osiek Jasielski, within Jasło County, Subcarpathian Voivodeship, in south-eastern Poland.
