= Niegłowice =

- Village
- Location within Poland
- Coordinates: 49°44′N 21°28′E
- Country: Poland
- Voivodeship: Subcarpathian
- County: Jasło
- Gmina: Jasło

Niegłowice [ɲɛɡwɔˈvit͡sɛ] is a village in the administrative district of Gmina Jasło, within Jasło County, Subcarpathian Voivodeship, in south-eastern Poland.

== World War II ==
During the German occupation of Poland in World War II, Niegłowice was the location of one of five oil refineries operated by the Nazis. The refinery was manned by prisoners of the Szebnie concentration camp nearby.
