= Sądkowa =

- Village
- Location within Poland
- Coordinates: 49°44′42″N 21°34′18″E
- Country: Poland
- Voivodeship: Podkarpackie
- County: Jasło
- Gmina: Tarnowiec

Sądkowa [sɔntˈkɔva] is a village in the administrative district of Gmina Tarnowiec, within Jasło County, Podkarpackie Voivodeship, in south-eastern Poland.
