= Mrukowa =

- Village
- Location within Poland
- Coordinates: 49°35′43″N 21°27′7″E
- Country: Poland
- Voivodeship: Subcarpathian
- County: Jasło
- Gmina: Osiek Jasielski
- Population: 570

Mrukowa [mruˈkɔva] is a village in the administrative district of Gmina Osiek Jasielski, within Jasło County, Subcarpathian Voivodeship, in south-eastern Poland.
