= Glinik Polski =

- Village
- Location within Poland
- Coordinates: 49°41′N 21°33′E
- Country: Poland
- Voivodeship: Subcarpathian
- County: Jasło
- Gmina: Tarnowiec
- Population: 530

Glinik Polski [ˈɡlinik ˈpɔlski] is a village in the administrative district of Gmina Tarnowiec, within Jasło County, Subcarpathian Voivodeship, in south-eastern Poland.
