= Nawsie Kołaczyckie =

- Village
- Location within Poland
- Coordinates: 49°48′N 21°28′E
- Country: Poland
- Voivodeship: Subcarpathian
- County: Jasło
- Gmina: Kołaczyce

Nawsie Kołaczyckie [ˈnafɕɛ kɔwaˈt͡ʂɨt͡skʲɛ] is a village in the administrative district of Gmina Kołaczyce, within Jasło County, Subcarpathian Voivodeship, in south-eastern Poland.
