= Wolica, Jasło County =

Wolica
- Village
- Location within Poland
- Coordinates: 49°43′22″N 21°30′49″E
- Country: Poland
- Voivodeship: Subcarpathian
- County: Jasło
- Gmina: Jasło
- Population: 830

Wolica [vɔˈlit͡sa] is a village in the administrative district of Gmina Jasło, within Jasło County, Subcarpathian Voivodeship, in south-eastern Poland.

In 2005 the village had a population of 830.
