= Błażkowa, Podkarpackie Voivodeship =

Błażkowa
- Village
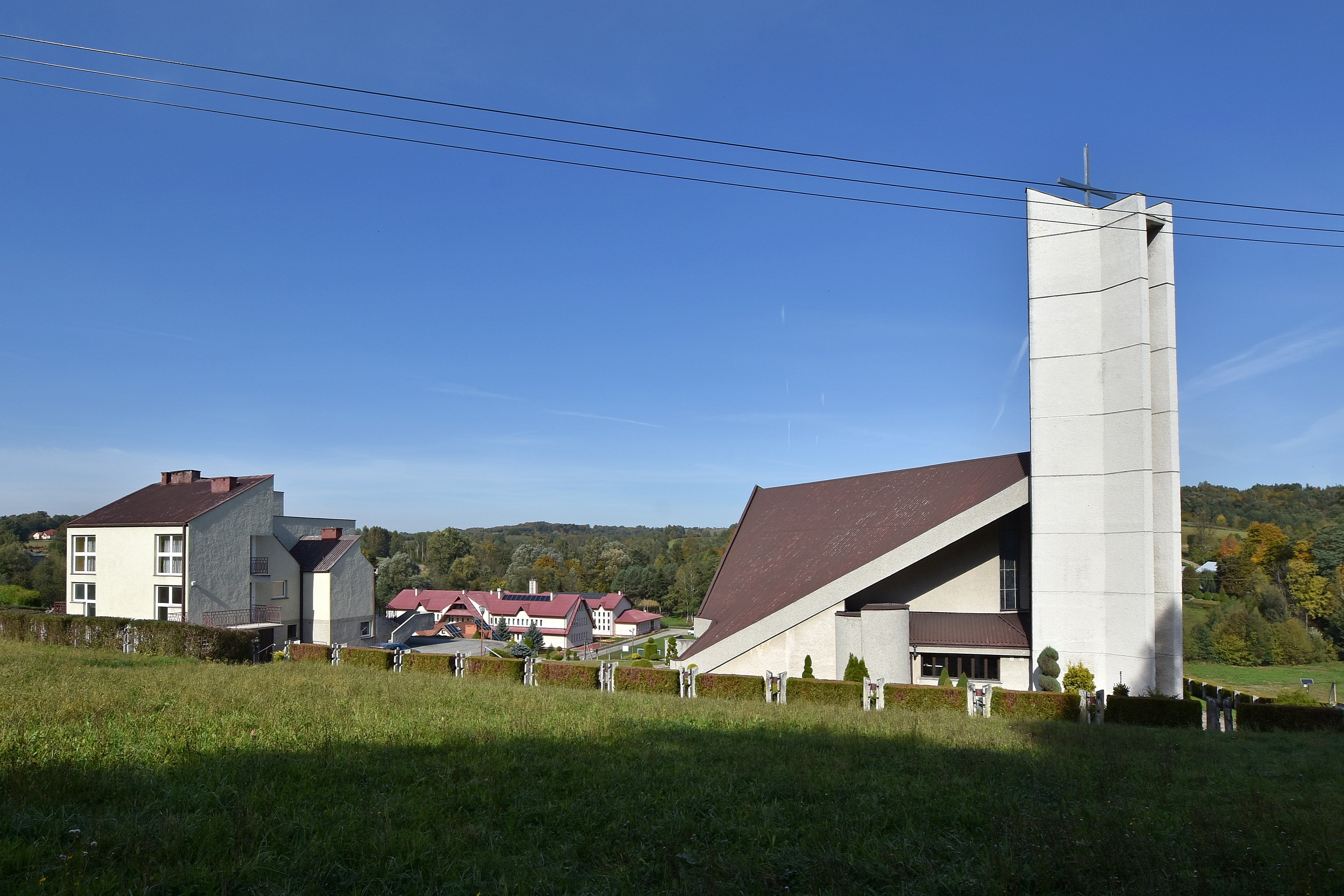

- Location within Poland
- Coordinates: 49°51′00″N 21°22′20″E
- Country: Poland
- Voivodeship: Subcarpathian
- County: Jasło
- Gmina: Brzyska

Population
  - Total: 1,616
- Time zone: UTC+1 (CET)
  - Summer (DST): UTC+2 (CEST)
- Vehicle registration: RJS

Błażkowa [bwaʂˈkɔva] is a village in the administrative district of Gmina Brzyska, within Jasło County, Subcarpathian Voivodeship, in south-eastern Poland.

Five Polish citizens were murdered by Nazi Germany in the village during World War II.
