= Załęże, Podkarpackie Voivodeship =

Załęże
- Village
- Location within Poland
- Coordinates: 49°40′N 21°29′E
- Country: Poland
- Voivodeship: Subcarpathian
- County: Jasło
- Gmina: Osiek Jasielski
- Population (approx.): 650

Załęże [zaˈwɛ̃ʐɛ] is a village in the administrative district of Gmina Osiek Jasielski, within Jasło County, Subcarpathian Voivodeship, in south-eastern Poland.
