= Lipnica Dolna, Podkarpackie Voivodeship =

Lipnica Dolna
- Village
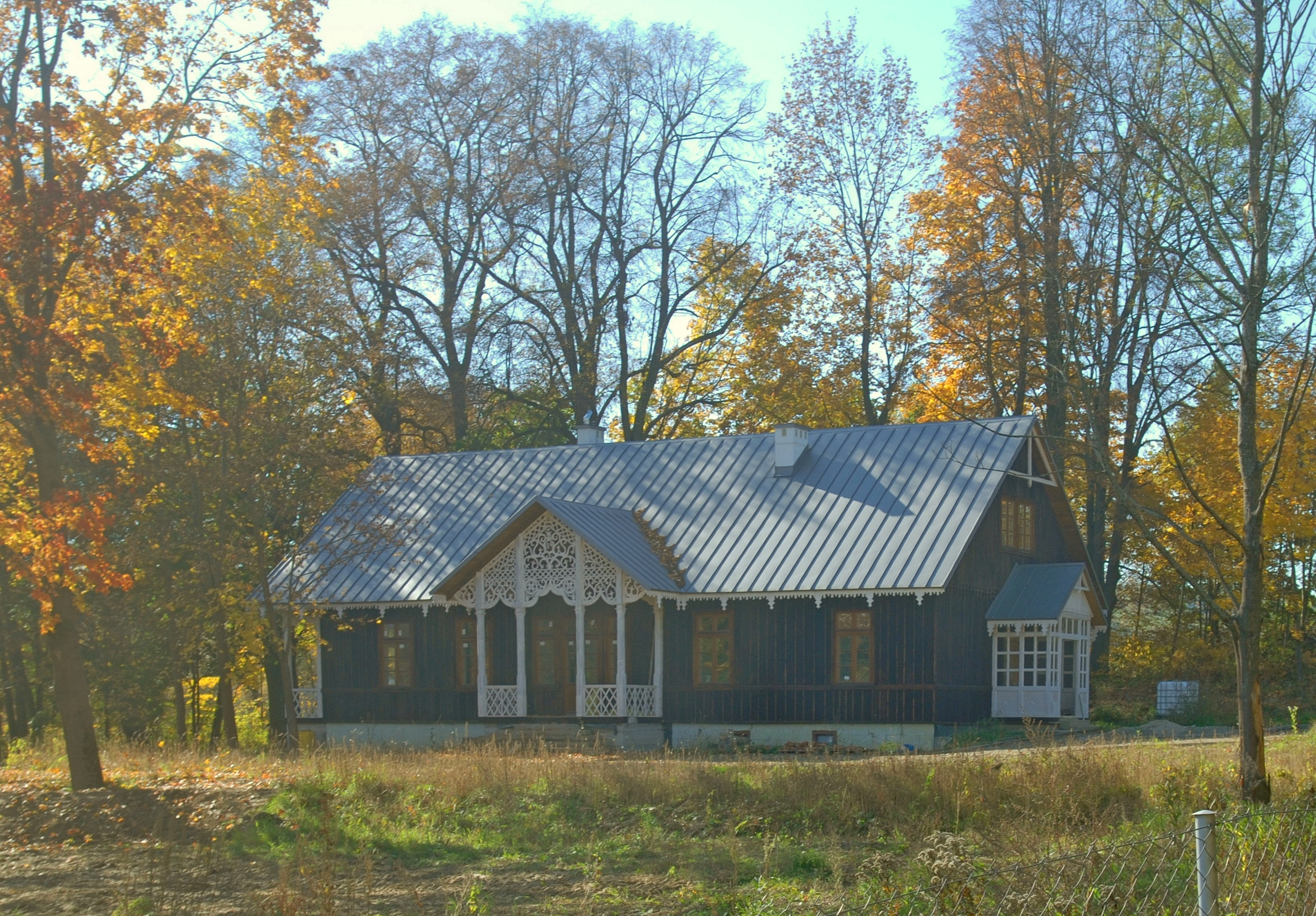
- Rylski family manor

- Location within Poland
- Coordinates: 49°46′56″N 21°22′55″E
- Country: Poland
- Voivodeship: Subcarpathian
- County: Jasło
- Gmina: Brzyska

Population
  - Total: 600

Lipnica Dolna (Polish pronunciation: [lipˈɲit͡sa ˈdɔlna]) is a village in the administrative district of Gmina Brzyska, within Jasło County, Subcarpathian Voivodeship, in south-eastern Poland.
