= Ujazd, Podkarpackie Voivodeship =

Ujazd
- Village
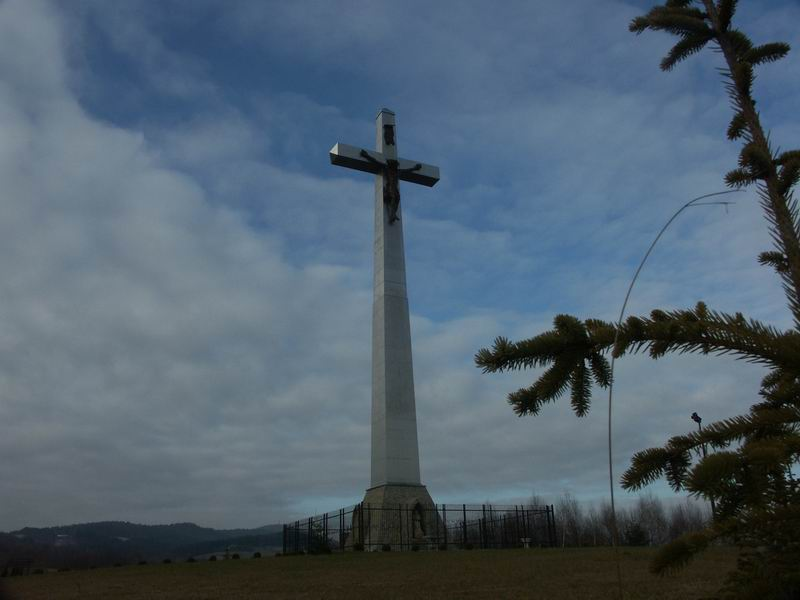

- Location within Poland
- Coordinates: 49°48′N 21°24′E
- Country: Poland
- Voivodeship: Subcarpathian
- County: Jasło
- Gmina: Brzyska
- Population: 530
- Time zone: UTC+1 (CET)
  - Summer (DST): UTC+2 (CEST)
- Vehicle registration: RJS

Ujazd [ˈujast] is a village in the administrative district of Gmina Brzyska, within Jasło County, Subcarpathian Voivodeship, in south-eastern Poland.
