= Brzyska =

- Village
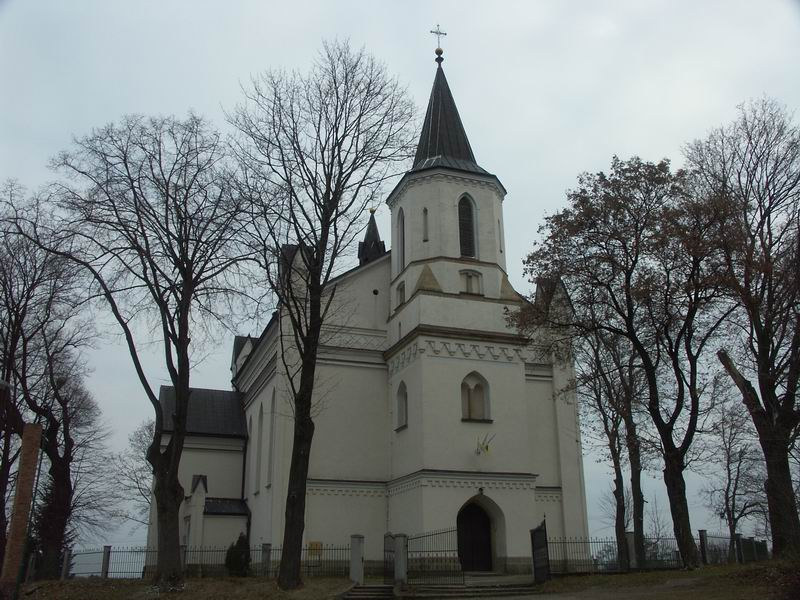
- Church of Saint Mary Magdalene

- Location within Poland
- Coordinates: 49°50′N 21°23′E
- Country: Poland
- Voivodeship: Subcarpathian
- County: Jasło
- Gmina: Brzyska

Population
  - Total: 1,900

Brzyska [ˈbʐɨska] is a village in Jasło County, Subcarpathian Voivodeship, in south-eastern Poland. It is the seat of the gmina (administrative district) called Gmina Brzyska.
