= Gmina Jasło =

Gmina Jasło Jasło Commune
- Gmina
- Coat of arms
- Interactive map of Gmina Jasło
- Coordinates (Jasło): 49°44′52″N 21°28′17″E
- Country: Poland
- Voivodeship: Subcarpathian
- County: Jasło
- Seat: Jasło

Area
  - Total: 93.1 km^{2} (35.9 sq mi)

Population (2006)
  - Total: 15,774
  - Density: 169/km^{2} (439/sq mi)
- Website: http://www.gminajaslo.pl/

Gmina Jasło is a rural gmina (administrative district) in Jasło County, Subcarpathian Voivodeship, in south-eastern Poland. Its seat is the town of Jasło, although the town is not part of the territory of the gmina.

The gmina covers an area of 93.1 square kilometres (35.9 sq mi), and as of 2006 its total population is 15,774.

== Villages ==
Gmina Jasło contains the villages and settlements of Bierówka, Brzyście, Chrząstówka, Gorajowice, Jareniówka, Kowalowy, Łaski, Niegłowice, Niepla, Opacie, Osobnica, Sobniów, Szebnie, Trzcinica, Warzyce, Wolica, Zimna Woda and Żółków.

== Neighbouring gminas ==
Gmina Jasło is bordered by the gminas of Brzyska, Dębowiec, Frysztak, Jedlicze, Kołaczyce, Lipinki, Skołyszyn, Tarnowiec and Wojaszówka.
