= Tarnowiec, Podkarpackie Voivodeship =

Tarnowiec
- Village
- Location within Poland
- Coordinates: 49°45′N 21°35′E
- Country: Poland
- Voivodeship: Subcarpathian
- County: Jasło
- Gmina: Tarnowiec
- Population: 1,154
- Website: http://www.tarnowiec.eu/

Tarnowiec [tarˈnɔvjɛt͡s] is a village in Jasło County, Subcarpathian Voivodeship, in south-eastern Poland. It is the seat of the gmina (administrative district) called Gmina Tarnowiec.
