= Kołaczyce =

- Town
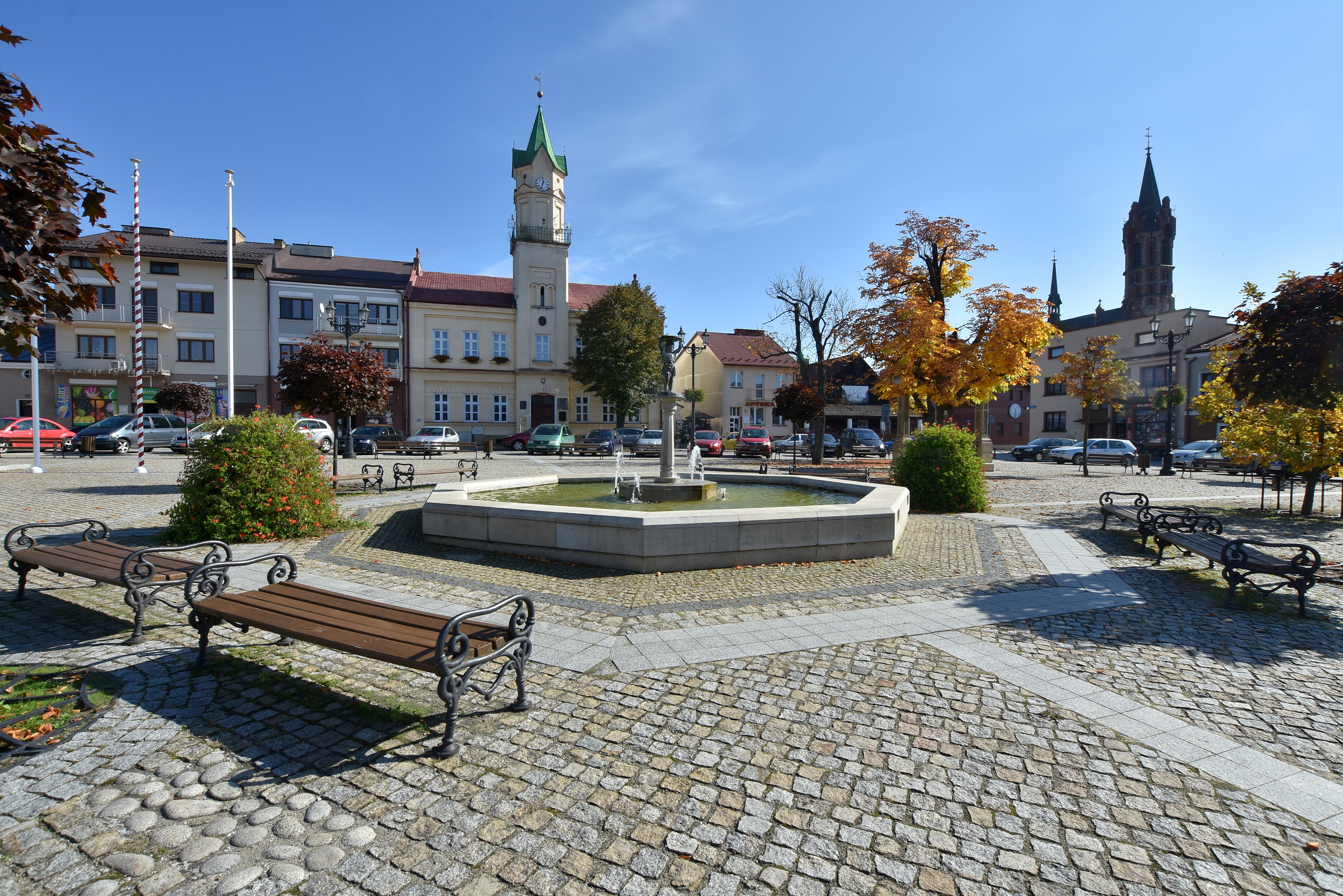
- Town square of Kołaczyce

- Coat of arms

- Location within Poland
- Coordinates: 49°48′38″N 21°26′1″E
- Country: Poland
- Voivodeship: Subcarpathian
- County: Jasło
- Gmina: Kołaczyce
- First mentioned: 1339
- Town rights: 1354

Population
  - Total: 1,316
- Time zone: UTC+1 (CET)
  - Summer (DST): UTC+2 (CEST)
- Vehicle registration: RJS
- Website: http://kolaczyce.itl.pl/

Kołaczyce [kɔwaˈt͡ʂɨt͡sɛ] is a town in Jasło County, Subcarpathian Voivodeship, in south-eastern Poland. It is the seat of the gmina (administrative district) called Gmina Kołaczyce.

== History ==
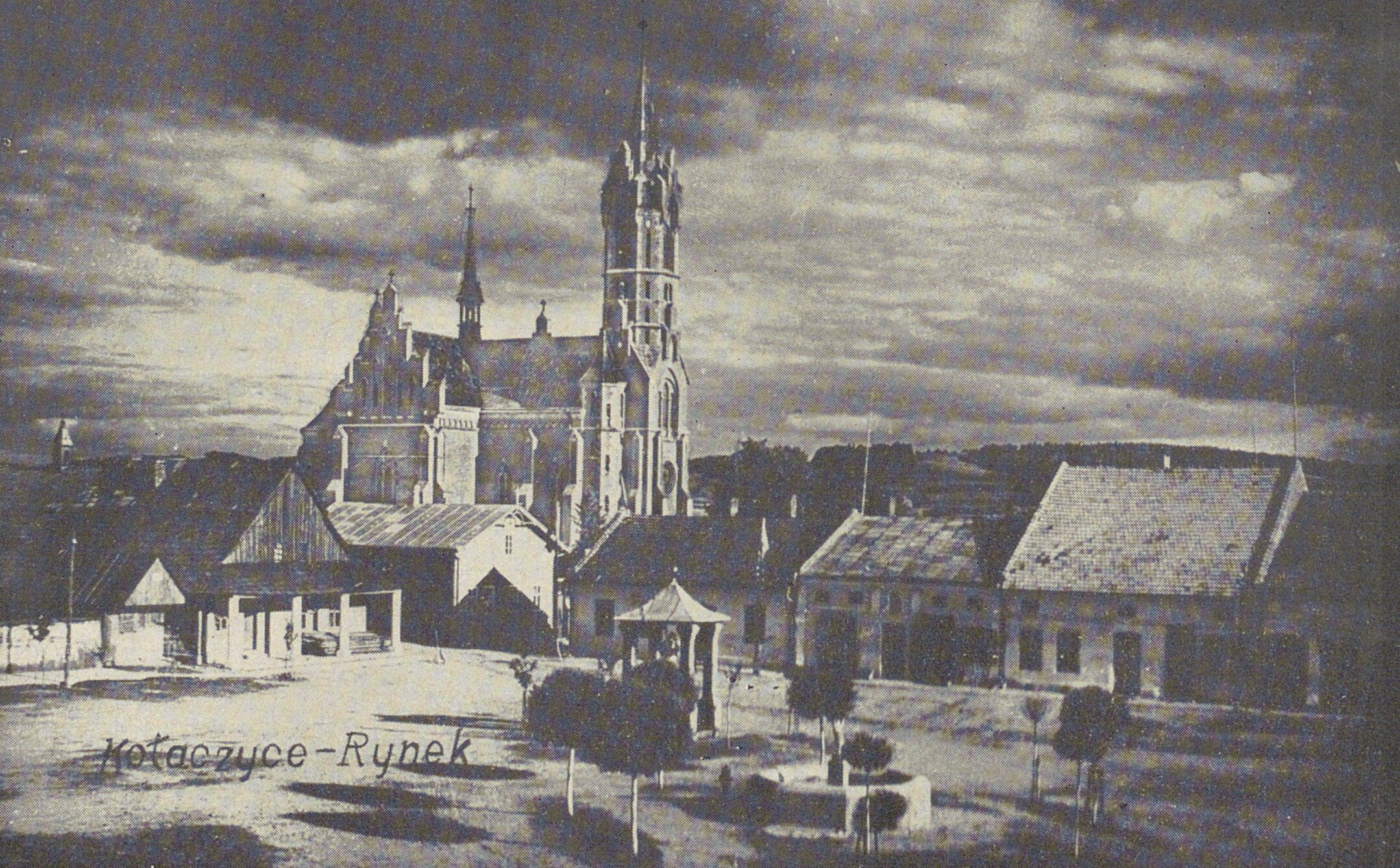
Market Square in the early 20th century

The village of Kolaczyce was founded probably in late 13th century, as property of the Benedictine Abbey from Tyniec. In 1339, it received town charter from King Casimir the Great. It was a private church town, administratively located in the Sandomierz Voivodeship in the Lesser Poland Province of the Kingdom of Poland. In 1474, Kołaczyce was burned to the ground by a Hungarian raid commanded by Thomas Tarczay. In 1546, the town burned in a great fire, while in 1657, it was completely destroyed by Transilvanian forces of George II Rakoczi (see Swedish invasion of Poland). In the past, Kołaczyce was spelled Colanthicze (1330), Colaczicze (1358), and Colacice (1401).

In 1772, Kolaczyce was annexed by the Habsburg Empire in the First Partition of Poland, and remained in Austrian Galicia until November 1918. In 1919, it lost its town status, regaining it in 2010. In the 19th century, Kolaczyce was famous for its shoe makers, which annually made app. 40 000 pairs of shoes. In the Second Polish Republic, Kolaczyce belonged to the Jasło County in the Krakow Voivodeship. According to the 1921 census, it had a population of 1,348, 92.7% Polish and 7.3% Jewish.

Following the German-Soviet invasion of Poland, which started World War II in September 1939, the settlement was occupied by Germany until 1944. It suffered from heavy destruction; its Jewish minority was decimated in the Holocaust by the occupiers. The Nazis gathered 260 Jews from the nearby town of Brzostek, and surrounding villages, marched them a few miles south along the road No. 73, and—having escorted them in groups of ten to a spot in the Podzamcze forest—killed them and buried in a mass grave. The place is marked by a memorial officially unveiled on 17 June 2012.

It regained town status on 1 January 2010, along with five other Polish localities.

== Sights ==
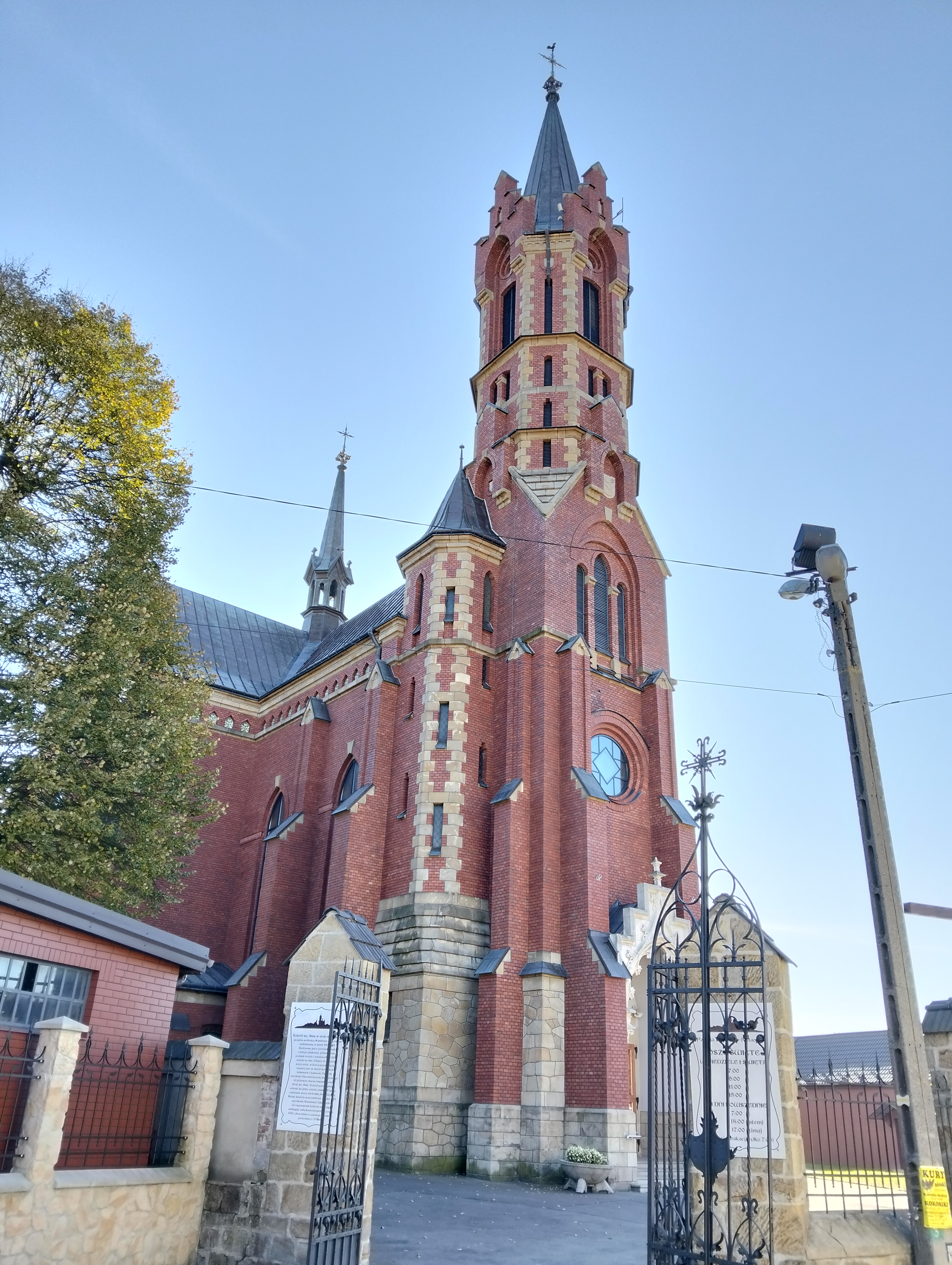
Saint Anne church

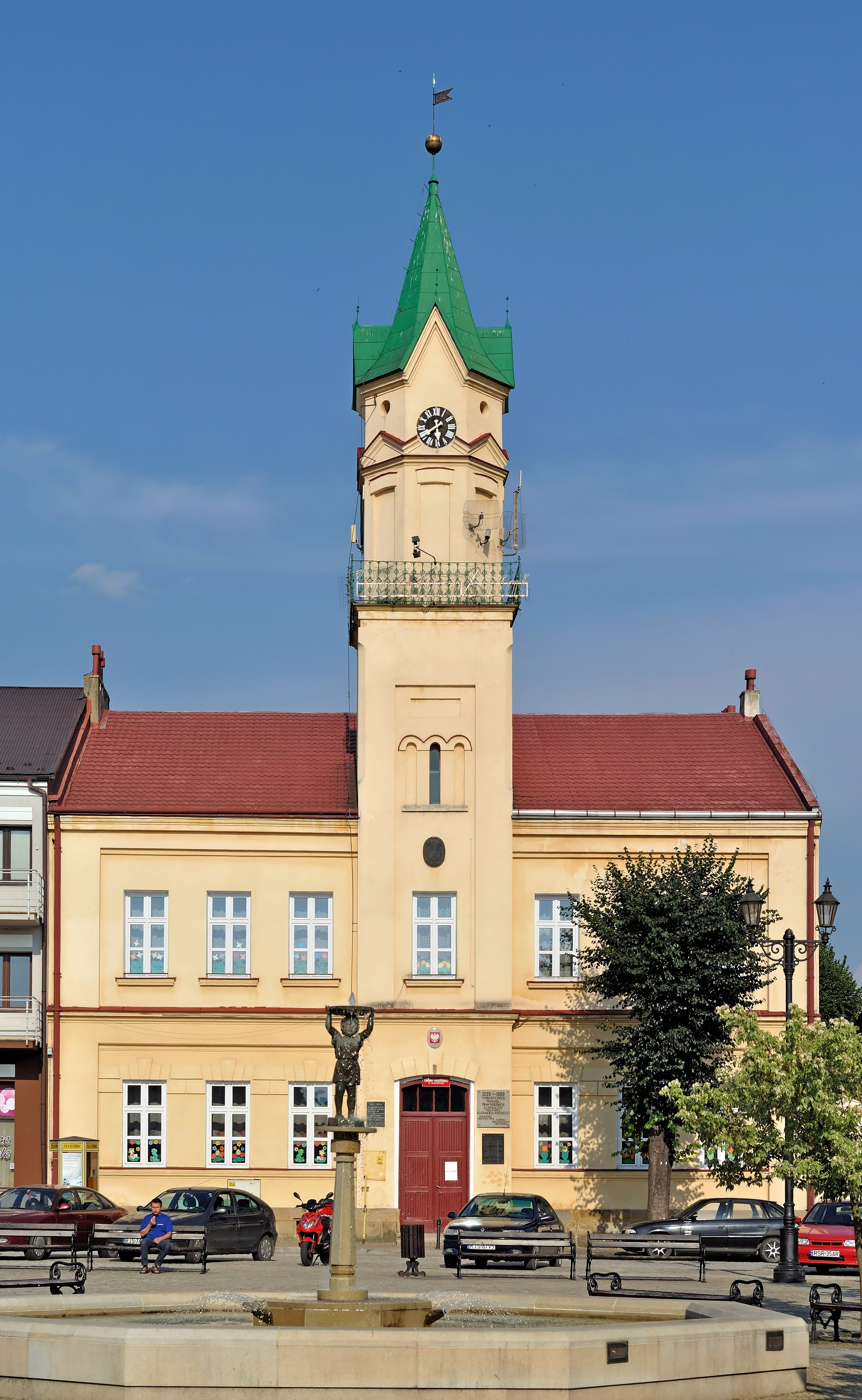
Town hall

- Market square with a fountain and 19th-century houses (including a house from 1792),
- St. Ann parish church with a 1632 holy water font,
- Roadside chapel (first half of 19th century),
- A figure of Our Lady in the market square (1803),
- World War I and World War II cemeteries.
