= Gmina Brzyska =

Gmina Brzyska Brzyska Commune
- Gmina
- Interactive map of Gmina Brzyska
- Coordinates (Brzyska): 49°50′N 21°23′E
- Country: Poland
- Voivodeship: Subcarpathian
- County: Jasło
- Seat: Brzyska

Area
  - Total: 45.13 km^{2} (17.42 sq mi)

Population (2006)
  - Total: 6,222
  - Density: 137.9/km^{2} (357.1/sq mi)
- Website: https://samorzad.gov.pl/web/gmina-brzyska

Gmina Brzyska is a rural gmina (administrative district) in Jasło County, Subcarpathian Voivodeship, in south-eastern Poland. Its seat is the village of Brzyska, which lies approximately 12 kilometres (7 mi) north-west of Jasło and 50 km (31 mi) south-west of the regional capital Rzeszów.

The gmina covers an area of 45.13 square kilometres (17.4 sq mi), and as of 2006 its total population is 6,222.

The gmina contains part of the protected area called Pasmo Brzanki Landscape Park.

== Villages ==
Gmina Brzyska contains the villages and settlements of Błażkowa, Brzyska, Dąbrówka, Kłodawa, Lipnica Dolna, Ujazd and Wróblowa.

== Neighbouring gminas ==
Gmina Brzyska is bordered by the town of Jasło and by the gminas of Brzostek, Jasło, Jodłowa, Kołaczyce, Nowy Żmigród, Skołyszyn and Szerzyny.
