= Gmina Tarnowiec =

Gmina Tarnowiec Tarnowiec Commune
- Gmina
- Coat of arms
- Interactive map of Gmina Tarnowiec
- Coordinates (Tarnowiec): 49°45′N 21°35′E
- Country: Poland
- Voivodeship: Subcarpathian
- County: Jasło
- Seat: Tarnowiec

Area
  - Total: 63.1 km^{2} (24.4 sq mi)

Population (2006)
  - Total: 9,130
  - Density: 145/km^{2} (375/sq mi)
- Website: http://www.tarnowiec.eu/

Gmina Tarnowiec is a rural gmina (administrative district) in Jasło County, Subcarpathian Voivodeship, in south-eastern Poland. Its seat is the village of Tarnowiec, which lies approximately 9 kilometres (6 mi) east of Jasło and 44 km (27 mi) south-west of the regional capital Rzeszów.

The gmina covers an area of 63.1 square kilometres (24.4 sq mi), and as of 2006 its total population is 9,130.

== Villages ==
Gmina Tarnowiec contains the villages and settlements of Brzezówka, Czeluśnica, Dobrucowa, Gąsówka, Gliniczek, Glinik Polski, Łajsce, Łubienko, Łubno Opace, Łubno Szlacheckie, Nowy Glinik, Potakówka, Roztoki, Sądkowa, Tarnowiec, Umieszcz and Wrocanka.

== Neighbouring gminas ==
Gmina Tarnowiec is bordered by the town of Jasło and by the gminas of Chorkówka, Dębowiec, Jasło, Jedlicze and Nowy Żmigród.
