= Żółków, Podkarpackie Voivodeship =

Żółków
- Village
- Location within Poland
- Coordinates: 49°42′34″N 21°28′22″E
- Country: Poland
- Voivodeship: Subcarpathian
- County: Jasło
- Gmina: Jasło
- Population: 750

Żółków [ˈʐuu̯kuf] is a village in the administrative district of Gmina Jasło, within Jasło County, Subcarpathian Voivodeship, in south-eastern Poland.
