= Szebnie concentration camp =

Nazi labor camp in Poland (1941–1944)

Coordinates: 49°46′N 21°36′E

Szebnie
- Forced-labor camp
- Top: plan of the camp, September 1943 Location of KL Szebnie in World War II, east of Plaszow concentration camp
- Other names: German: Lager Szebnie
- Location: Szebnie, occupied Poland
- Operated by: Schutzstaffel (SS)
- Original use: Internment
- Operational: June 1941 – August 1944
- Inmates: Jews, Poles, Ukrainians, Roma
- Killed: 10,000
- Liberated by: The Red Army
- Website: Szebnie at Virtual Shtetl

Szebnie was a forced-labor camp established during World War II by Nazi Germany in the General Government in the south-eastern part of occupied Poland. It was located near the town of Szebnie approximately 10 kilometres (6 mi) east of Jasło and 42 km (26 mi) south-west of Rzeszów. The facility was constructed in 1940 originally as horse stables for the Wehrmacht, adjacent to a manorial estate where the German officers stationed (photo). Over the course of the camp's operation thousands of people perished there, including Soviet prisoners of war, Polish Jews, Poles, Ukrainians, and Romani people. The Soviets entered the camp's charred remains on 8 September 1944.

== Operation ==
The camp covered an area of about 10 hectares with some 35 barracks eventually. First, it became a POW camp (Kriegsgefangenenlager) in late June 1941 for some 6,000 Red Army soldiers, captured in the Soviet zone of occupied Poland after the implementation of Operation Barbarossa. The POWs built the first 20 barracks with three-level bunk-beds (not enough for all). Most of them perished from disease and hunger with no heat in winter, and no laundry or bath; up to 200 a day. The only person who courageously helped the sick during typhus epidemic was a young lady, Helena Gorayska, who paid for it with her own life in 1942 when she became infected with typhus. Some other locals also offered foodstuffs.

In the spring of 1943 the camp was reinstated as a forced-labor camp for Poles, Jews, Ukrainians, and Gypsies. The first new prisoners arrived in Holocaust trains from the Jewish ghettos liquidated across occupied Poland. By August, it held 1,040 people. By the fall of 1943 the number of prisoners reached 5,000 including Jews and non-Jews from Rzeszów, Tarnów, Bochnia, Jasło, Frysztak, Dukla and Pustków. The Jews had been appointed the camp's only Kapos compelled to maintain discipline and administer torture. Eventually, the camp held about 10,000 deportees, men, women, and children. Some prisoners were employed at a tailor shop for the German military, but most worked at various earth works in the area; at the gravel pit, in the SS farm, at the oil refinery in Niegłowice, and at the Hitler's Bunker in Stępina. The camp was surrounded by barb-wire fences with six guard towers and search lights around the perimeter.

The camp commandants included Untersturmführer Anton Scheidt (inventor of prisoner "crew train" running 12-hour shifts round-the-clock), Hauptsturmführer Hans Kellermann (predator of young camp-women, put in jail by the SS for stealing from the Reich), and SS-Hauptsturmführer Karl Blank (as the last, for just two weeks). Notably, stealing collected gold and money for personal enrichment was a common practice among concentration camp commandants; two of them, Koch and Florstedt both from Majdanek, were executed by the SS for the same reason in April 1945. Through the whole existence of the camp the commandants resided in the Gorayski manor, holding wild drinking parties for the SS several times a week (Scheidt) and trapping scores of attractive Jewish and non-Jewish "house maids" (Kellermann).

== Liquidation ==
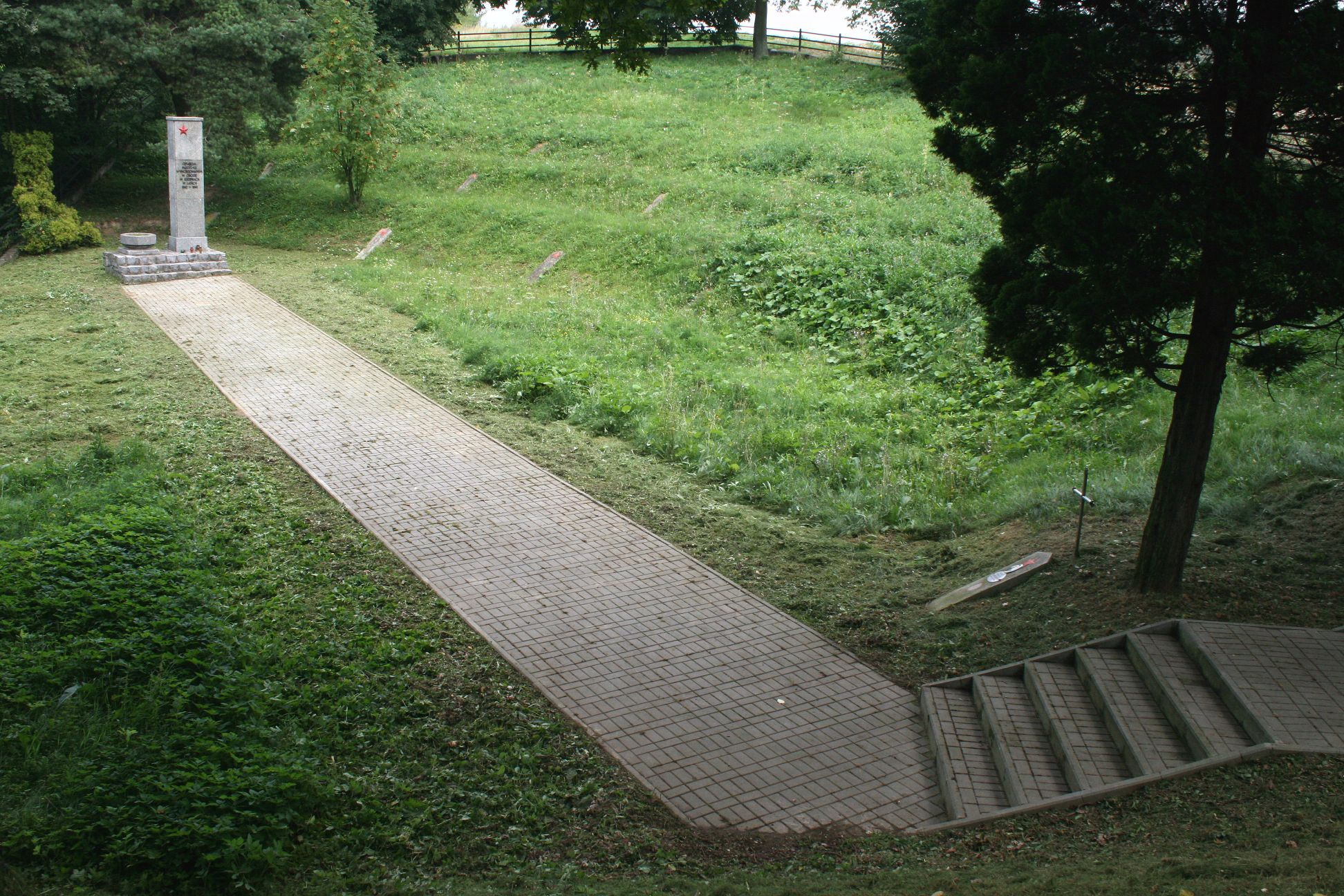
World War II cemetery at Bierowskie Doły with unmarked mass graves covering the entire perimeter. Notably, the old monument mentions only the Soviet prisoners of war from Szebnie (2008)

In August 1943, the Jews were separated from the rest of prisoners in a special Jewish zone on the north side of the camp behind a barb-wire fence (see map). Subsequently, almost two thousand were murdered in mass executions at the Dobrucowa Forest nearby in the fall and winter of 1943, on the orders of SS-Hauptsturmführer Amon Göth from Płaszów. Some 700 Jews were killed in one day on 22 September 1943, forced to undress. Their bodies were incinerated on site by the end of the month. On 6 October, another group of 500 Jews were shot and burned. On 5 November 1943, some 2,800 Jews were loaded onto Holocaust trains and sent to Auschwitz concentration camp, where most of them were murdered. Seven are known to have escaped. By February 1944 only 80 Jews remained in the camp. They were transported to Kraków-Płaszów. Most of the remaining non-Jewish prisoners were evacuated in 14–25 August 1944 further west to Grybów camp, except for some 300 of the weakest.

The camp was used temporarily for four months (between February and July 1944), to keep additional Soviet POWs. It was known as Stalag 325 even though in 1942 it was known as Stalag 327, apparently not perceived as sequential by German administration. The POWs were massacred by the Ukrainian 14th Waffen SS Division soldiers, brought in specifically for this purpose from the SS Heidelager troop-training facility in Pustków nearby. Most of the barracks were burned down. The remains of the camp were entered by the Soviet Red Army on 8 September 1944. The site has not been protected legally. Usable building materials were eventually hauled away.
