= Gmina Kołaczyce =

Gmina Kołaczyce Kołaczyce Commune
- Gmina
- Coat of arms
- Interactive map of Gmina Kołaczyce
- Coordinates (Kołaczyce): 49°48′38″N 21°26′1″E
- Country: Poland
- Voivodeship: Subcarpathian
- County: Jasło
- Seat: Kołaczyce

Area
  - Total: 60 km^{2} (23 sq mi)

Population (2006)
  - Total: 8,832
  - Density: 150/km^{2} (380/sq mi)
- Website: http://www.kolaczyce.itl.pl

Gmina Kołaczyce is an urban-rural gmina (administrative district) in Jasło County, Subcarpathian Voivodeship, in south-eastern Poland. Its seat is the town of Kołaczyce, which lies approximately 8 kilometres (5 mi) north of Jasło and 48 km (30 mi) south-west of the regional capital Rzeszów.

The gmina covers an area of 60 square kilometres (23.2 sq mi), and as of 2006 its total population is 8,832. Before 1 January 2010, when Kołaczyce became a town, the district was classed as a rural gmina.

== Villages ==
Apart from the town of Kołaczyce, the gmina contains the villages of Bieździadka, Bieździedza, Krajowice, Lublica, Nawsie Kołaczyckie, Sieklówka and Sowina.

== Neighbouring gminas ==
Gmina Kołaczyce is bordered by the town of Jasło and by the gminas of Brzostek, Brzyska, Frysztak and Jasło.
