= Gmina Osiek Jasielski =

Gmina Osiek Jasielski Osiek Jasielski Commune
- Gmina
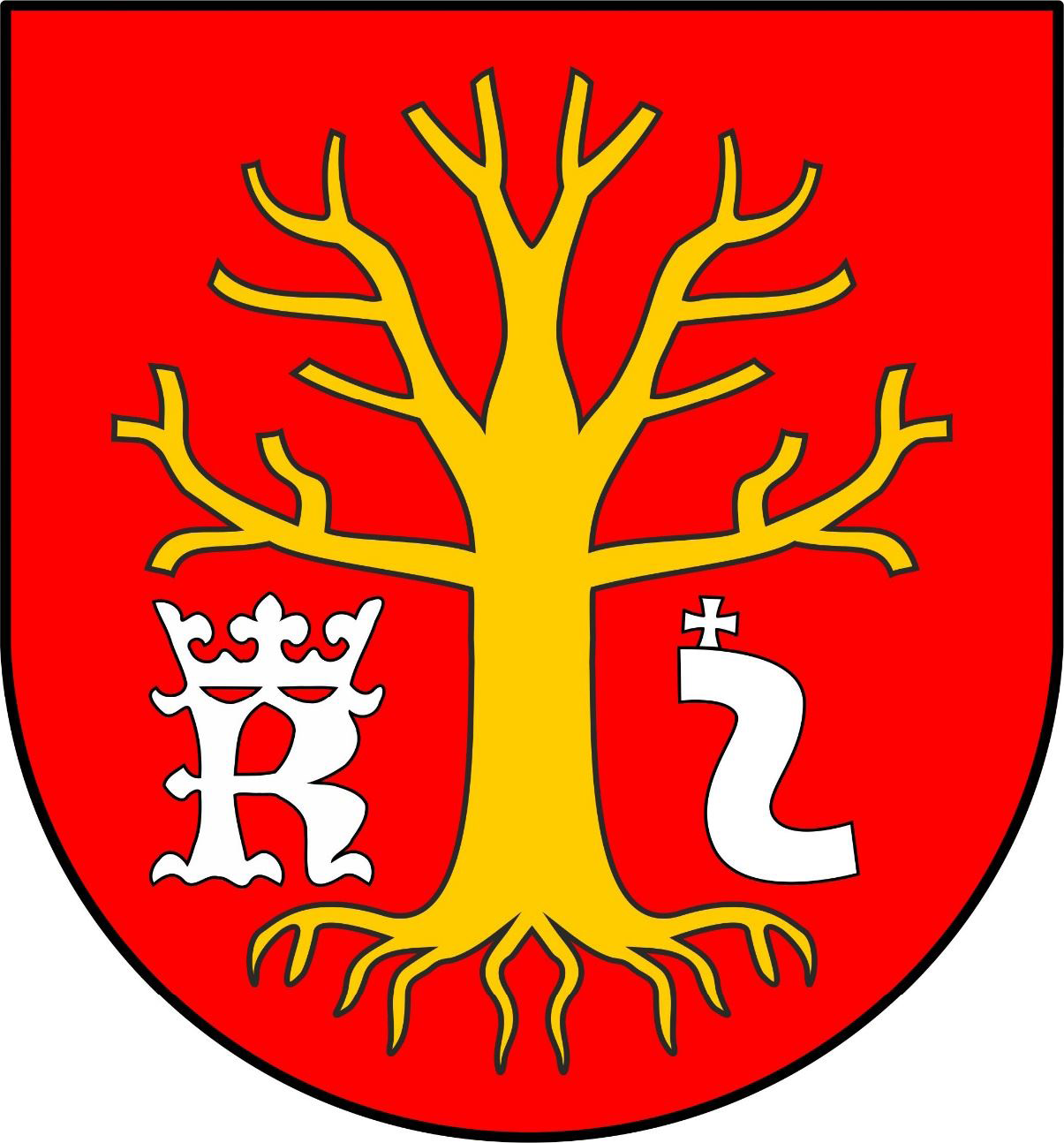
- Flag Coat of arms
- Interactive map of Gmina Osiek Jasielski
- Coordinates (Osiek Jasielski): 49°38′N 21°29′E
- Country: Poland
- Voivodeship: Subcarpathian
- County: Jasło
- Seat: Osiek Jasielski

Area
  - Total: 60.47 km^{2} (23.35 sq mi)

Population (2006)
  - Total: 5,308
  - Density: 87.78/km^{2} (227.3/sq mi)
- Website: https://www.osiekjasielski.pl

Gmina Osiek Jasielski is a rural gmina in Jasło County, Subcarpathian Voivodeship, in south-eastern Poland. Its seat is the village of Osiek Jasielski, which lies approximately 13 kilometres (8 mi) south of Jasło and 59 km (37 mi) south-west of the regional capital Rzeszów.

The gmina covers an area of 60.47 square kilometres (23.3 sq mi), and as of 2006 its total population is 5,308.

== Villages ==
Gmina Osiek Jasielski contains the villages and settlements of Czekaj, Mrukowa, Osiek Jasielski, Pielgrzymka, Samoklęski, Świerchowa, Załęże and Zawadka Osiecka.

== Neighbouring gminas ==
Gmina Osiek Jasielski is bordered by the gminas of Dębowiec, Krempna, Nowy Żmigród and Sękowa.
