= Osiek Jasielski =

- Village
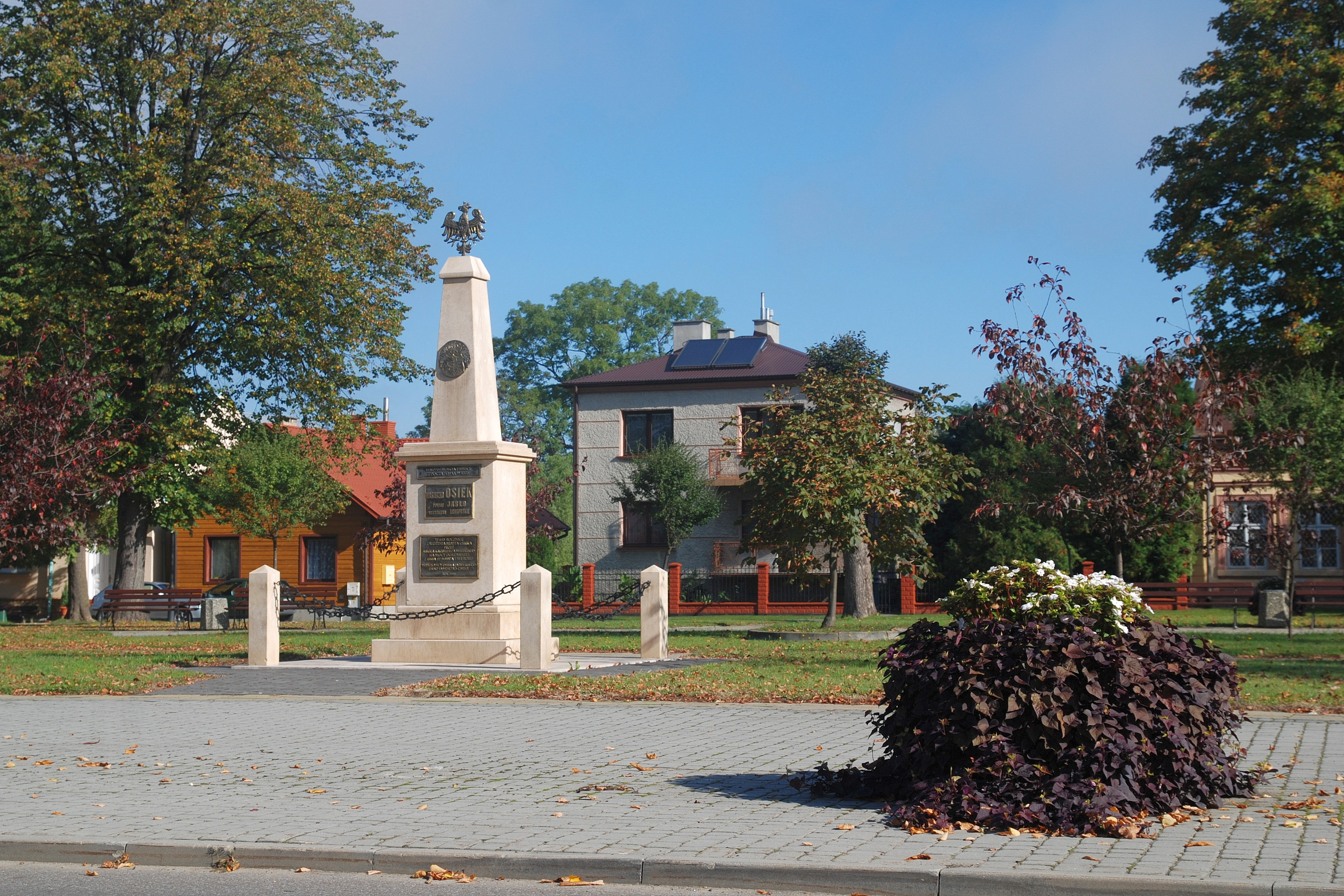
- Part of the village square

- Location within Poland
- Coordinates: 49°38′N 21°29′E
- Country: Poland
- Voivodeship: Subcarpathian
- County: Jasło
- Gmina: Osiek Jasielski
- Population: 680

Osiek Jasielski [ˈɔɕɛk jaˈɕɛlski] is a village in Jasło County, Subcarpathian Voivodeship, in south-eastern Poland. It is the seat of the gmina (administrative district) called Gmina Osiek Jasielski.

Osiek Jasielski is located on a hill, some 270 meters above sea level, along the Wisloka river. The defensive settlement of Osiek probably existed since early Middle Ages, guarding southeastern corner of Lesser Poland. In 1365, King Casimir the Great decided to found here a town, together with a castle, with the purpose of defending Poland from possible Hungarian raids. Osiek was the seat of a starosta, and the newly established town was famous for its fairs, which took place twice a year, on 28 April and 13 July. Royal bill confirming dates of fairs was announced on 2 July 1583, at the market square in Biecz.

Osiek, which until 1772 was part of Biecz County, Krakow Voivodeship, remained a small town. According to some sources, its town charter was voided in 1604, to be returned by King Sigismund III Vasa on 12 March 1618. Most of its residents supported themselves by cultivating land, and the number of artisans was small.

Following the first partition of Poland (1772) Osiek became part of Austrian Galicia, in which it remained until November 1918. In 1934 the government of the Second Polish Republic stripped it of the town charter. During World War II, Osiek was one of stops along the route from General Government to Hungary. The route was used by the Home Army, which was very strong in the area. During Operation Tempest, two bridges were blown up by the Home Army on 11 August 1944, disturbing movements of the Wehrmacht.

Before World War II, Osiek had a thriving Jewish community that made up about 25% of the town's population. On 7 July 1942, German military police — assisted by Polish and Ukrainian police — rounded up about 1,250 Jews from Osiek and surrounding villages. They separated out able-bodied adults to become slave laborers. The policemen then led the rest of their captives, including all children and the elderly, into the forest, where they massacred them with machine guns and buried them in pits. The surviving Jews were murdered later that summer in death camps, including Belzec extermination camp.
