= Dąbrówka, Jasło County =

Dąbrówka
- Village
- Location within Poland
- Coordinates: 49°46′34″N 21°24′9″E
- Country: Poland
- Voivodeship: Subcarpathian
- County: Jasło
- Gmina: Brzyska
- Population: 440

Dąbrówka [dɔmˈbrufka] is a village in the administrative district of Gmina Brzyska, within Jasło County, Subcarpathian Voivodeship, in south-eastern Poland.
