= Jasło County =

Jasło County Powiat jasielski
- County
- Coat of arms

- Location within the voivodeship

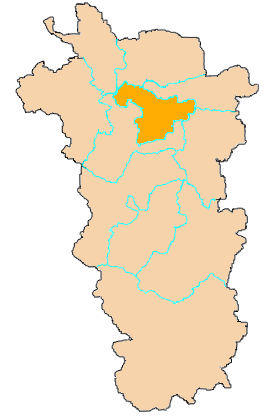
- Division into gminas
- Coordinates (Jasło): 49°44′52″N 21°28′17″E
- Country: Poland
- Voivodeship: Subcarpathian
- Seat: Jasło
- Gminas: Total 10 (incl. 1 urban): Jasło; Gmina Brzyska; Gmina Dębowiec; Gmina Jasło; Gmina Kołaczyce; Gmina Krempna; Gmina Nowy Żmigród; Gmina Osiek Jasielski; Gmina Skołyszyn; Gmina Tarnowiec

Area
  - Total: 830.41 km^{2} (320.62 sq mi)

Population (2019)
  - Total: 113,730
  - Density: 136.96/km^{2} (354.72/sq mi)
  - Urban: 36,472
  - Rural: 77,258
- Car plates: RJS
- Website: www.powiat.jaslo.pl

Jasło County (Polish: powiat jasielski) is a unit of territorial administration and local government (powiat) in Subcarpathian Voivodeship, south-eastern Poland, on the Slovak border. It came into being on January 1, 1999, as a result of the Polish local government reforms passed in 1998. Its administrative seat is Jasło, which lies 50 kilometres (31 mi) south-west of the regional capital Rzeszów. The only other town in the county is Kołaczyce, which is 8 km (5.0 mi) north of Jasło.

The county covers an area of 830.41 square kilometres (320.6 sq mi). As of 2019 its total population was 113,730, out of which the population of Jasło was 35,063, that of Jasło was 1,409, and the rural population was 77,258.

== Neighbouring counties ==
Jasło County is bordered by Gorlice County to the west, Tarnów County to the north-west, Dębica County to the north, Strzyżów County to the north-east and Krosno County to the east. It also borders Slovakia to the south.

== Administrative divisions ==
The county is subdivided into 10 gminas (one urban, one urban-rural and eight rural). These are listed in the following table, in descending order of population.

| Gmina | Type | Area (km^{2}) | Population (2019) | Seat |
|---|---|---|---|---|
| Jasło | urban | 36.7 | 35,063 | |
| Gmina Jasło | rural | 93.1 | 16,379 | Jasło * |
| Gmina Skołyszyn | rural | 77.9 | 12,490 | Skołyszyn |
| Gmina Nowy Żmigród | rural | 104.5 | 9,038 | Nowy Żmigród |
| Gmina Tarnowiec | rural | 63.1 | 9,156 | Tarnowiec |
| Gmina Kołaczyce | urban-rural | 60.0 | 8,953 | Kołaczyce |
| Gmina Dębowiec | rural | 85.8 | 8,855 | Dębowiec |
| Gmina Brzyska | rural | 45.1 | 6,549 | Brzyska |
| Gmina Osiek Jasielski | rural | 60.5 | 5,373 | Osiek Jasielski |
| Gmina Krempna | rural | 205.1 | 1,874 | Krempna |
* seat not part of the gmina
