= Draganowa =

- Village
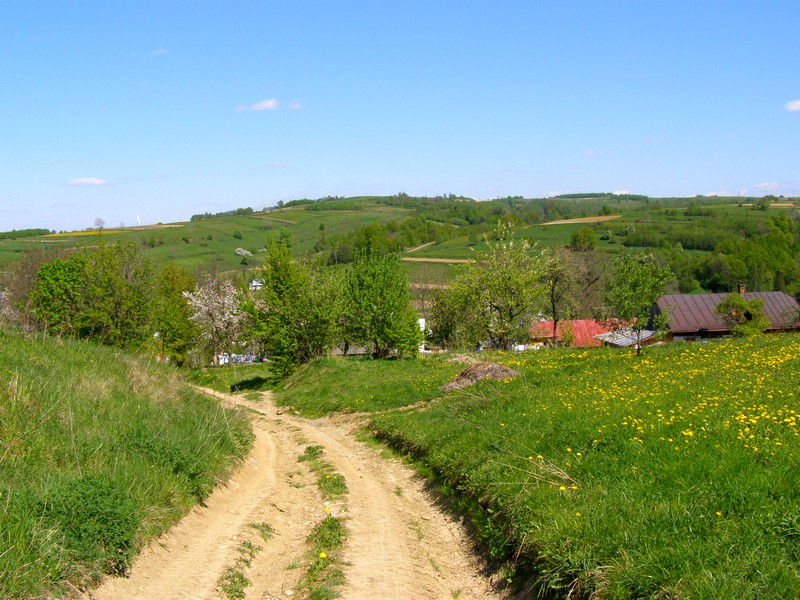
- View of Draganowa village

- Location within Poland
- Coordinates: 49°35′26″N 21°37′19″E
- Country: Poland
- Voivodeship: Subcarpathian
- County: Krosno
- Gmina: Chorkówka
- Population (2024): 487
- Website: http://www.draganowa.info/

Draganowa [draɡaˈnɔva] is a village in the administrative district of Gmina Chorkówka, within Krosno County, Subcarpathian Voivodeship, in south-eastern Poland. It has the status of a village council.

The village is remote, located at the meeting point of the Low Beskids and the Carpathian Foothills, with a rich history dating back to the 14th century (the first written records date back to 1366). Draganowa is located near the so-called Valley of Death, where the Battle of the Dukla Pass saw some of the most intense fighting of the Second World War. Parts of the woods surrounding Draganowa continue to pose a landmine and shell danger.

The village was electrified in 1954.

It is home to a Roman Catholic church dedicated to Our Lady of the Rosary, built in 1985, belonging to the parish of the Nativity of the Blessed Virgin Mary in Kobylany, in the Dukla deanery of the Archdiocese of Przemyśl.

== Etymology ==
The name "Draganowa" comes from the personal name Dragan/Drogan (with analogous Polish forms Drogomir, Drogosław), common among South Slavs but also Vlachs, the latter of whom settled this area of the Polish Carpathians from the 13th century.

The village was first mentioned as Draganowo in 1366. Later in 1377, it is seen as Droganowa and, as recorded in 1487, Droganow. The current name was first recorded in 1494. The name of the village is still pronounced in the local dialect today as Droganowo, where the first and last "a" became "á" (slanted vowel pronounced closer to "o").

The names of individual parts of the village are: Dół (Pit), Góra (Hill), Łan, Kopalnia (Mine), and Potok (Stream). Residents also use other names for parts of the village: Górka (Little Hill), Obszary, Pod Skałą (Under the Rock), Stawiska (Ponds), Szczerbówka, Zawsie (Beyond the Village), and Zapłocie (Beyond the Fence).

In Draganowa there are also various names for agricultural plots, e.g. Bieszczodek, Butkówka, Dalidebrza, Depszczyna, Doły, Dzielnica, Dziurówki, Kąty, Kopalnia, Leszczyny, Łazy, Machówka, Na Ćwiertkach, Olszyny, Ostrowiec, Pod Jazem, Pod Stówkami, Porąbka, Przegięte, Przycznica, Skopkownia, Smreki (pronounced Smroki), Stogłówki, Szuliki, Średnie, Toki, Uklejówka, Wątoka, Wierzgorz.

== History ==
=== Early Middle Ages ===
The lands surrounding what would become Draganowa and Wietrzno had belonged to the tribal state of the Vistulans, a Lechitic tribe which later assimilated into the Małopolans, between the 8th and 9th centuries. It would be part of Great Moravia in the 9th century. A hillfort settlement existed at Wietrzno, close to Draganowa, until the 11th century, when it was destroyed, most likely by a fire.

=== High Middle Ages ===
It is believed that Draganowa was founded in the 13th or 14th century by Vlachs due to the toponymy of the village, derived from the personal name Dragan. These Vlachs were most likely Slavicized by the East Slavic tribes which had populated the area, an analogous development to that which later gave rise to the Rusyn ethnicity deeper in the mountains, and namely to the Lemkos, with which would later Draganowa share a boundary with the village sitting near the border of Polish lands with Lemkovyna.

Draganowa was located in the easternmost part of Lesser Poland, on the border with Kievan Rus' (specifically the Principality of Galicia) and directly adjacent to East Slavic populations to its south and east, and thus from the 10th–14th centuries was located near the conflict zone during skirmishes and wars between Poland and Rus' and its successor state, the Kingdom of Galicia–Volhynia.

=== Late Middle Ages ===
After the annexation of the nearby Galicia into the Kingdom of Poland in the early 14th century, Draganowa was located in the Kraków Voivodeship near the tripoint with the Sandomierz and Ruthenian Voivodeships. Casimir III the Great, King of Poland, began settling the Galician lands, including the Carpathian Foothills and Low Beskids, with settlers from deeper inside Poland as well as with German citizens, hoping to establish a defense force in the area. However, most of these settlers would become farmers according to Maciej Stryjkowski.

Draganowa is first mentioned in a document dated 28 August 1366 as a village belonging to the chancellor Janusz Suchywilk, a descendant of Przecław of Gułtowy (the Voivode of Kalisz) and an influential figure in the court of Casimir the Great. A document issued in Włodzimierz approved the division of chancellor Suchywilk's estate and the patronage of part of the property to his nephews. The next written source concerning Draganowa dates back to 1377. On October 17 of that year, the brothers Jakusz, Mikołaj and Piotr, sons of the deceased Jakub Cztan, knight and heir to Strzelce, divided their estates in such a way that Draganowa and other estates (the Kobylany estate) went to Jakusz and his descendants. This division was confirmed by Queen Jadwiga on December 1, 1385, in Kraków, at the requests of Janusz, Przecław, Jakusz, and Domarad – sons of Jakusz Cztan.

In 1408, Domarad of Kobylany, vouching for his brother Jakusz, sold Draganowa, along with another nearby village, Makowiska, to Wiernek of Gabań for 300 grivnas.

In 1412, Wiernek of Gabań assigned his wife Małgorzata a 300 grivna dowry in the villages of Makowiska and Draganowa.

In 1414, Wiernek of Gabań assigned his son Wiernek a third of the villages of Makowiska and Draganowa as his share. Wiernek, son of Wiernek of Gabań, sold the third part in the villages of Makowiska and Draganowa for 700 grivna. In 1419, Zbychna, the widow of Wiernek of Gabań, testified that she would not disturb Wiernek's sons: Wiernek, Stanisław Łaszek, Bernard, and Piotr, regarding their inheritance of Stronia, Makowisko, Draganowa, and Wola (Chirwatowa, today Chyrowa).

In 1467, Jan of Kobylany was sued by Mikołaj and Katarzyna Stadnicki and Jan and Krzesław Wojszyk; his half-siblings and heirs of Żmigród, for refusing to divide the lands with them and build mounds between their estates: Siedliska, Lisia Góra (today Łysa Góra) and his own: Makowisko, Leszczyna, Draganowa, and Głośce (today Głojsce).

In 1482, in a marital agreement between Agnieszka of Bnin (Kalisz Voivodeship), wife of Jakub of Dębno, Castellan of Kraków, and her son, Hieronim Kobyleński of Kobylany, vouching for her minor brothers Jan and Jakub, agreed not to redeem from her until her death the estates of Kobylany, Makowisko, Draganowa, and Głosce, bequeathed to her by their father (her first husband, Jan of Kobylany) as dowry.

In 1485, the brothers Hieronim, Jan, and Jakub of Kobylany agreed to pay 2,300 Hungarian florins to Piotr Myszkowski as their sister Agnieszka's dowry, under the guarantee that he would be bound to Kobylany, Sulistrowa, Makowiska, Draganowa, and Głosce. In 1487, from the division of property between the brothers Hieronim, Jan, and Jakub of Kobylany, Hieronim received Kobylany and its villages, including Draganowa. At that time, Draganowa belonged to the Biecz County.

In 1494, Hieronim, the heir to Kobylany, pledged the villages of Głosce and Draganowa to Jan Kolanowski for 100 florins.

In 1496, Hieronim Kobyleński of Kobylany testified that, approving the entail of his ancestor, Chancellor Janusz, confirmed by Casimir the Great in 1366, and having no male offspring under this entail, he donated the Kobylany estates, including the village of Draganowa, which he inherited genealogically from the chancellor, to the brothers Jan and Jakub Kobyleński. In 1508, documents recorded a levy of 4 lans in Draganowa.

In 1529, Jan of Kobylany bequeathed to his son Mikołaj the Kobylany estate, including the village of Draganowa, inherited from his brother Hieronim.

In 1530, by a ruling of the royal court, Jan Kobyleński and his son Mikołaj were to grant Dorota of Tarnów in Pilzno County, wife of Jan Tarło of Szczekarzowice, Sandomierz County, half of Kobylany, Draganowa, and Głośce, as well as the entire villages of Łęki, Sulistrowa, and Makowiska.

In the years 1530–1536, Draganowa had 4 lans of farmland, an inn, and a single-wheel mill.

In 1581, the then-owner of Draganowa, Stanisław Bolikowski, paid taxes on two peasant farms, two crofters with their land, and four bailiffs with their cattle, and half the farmland was deserted.

In 1596, Draganowa belonged to the parish of Żmigród Stary.

=== Interwar era and Second World War ===
In 1936, the company Polmin opened the Crude Oil Mine in Draganowa, which became the workplace of many inhabitants of the village. Although crude oil mining had been a major part of nearby Wietrzno and Ropianka's economies since Ignacy Łukasiewicz first distilled kerosene from seep crude oil and constructed the world's first oil well at Bóbrka in 1854, the Draganowa mine would close shortly after due to the outbreak of the Second World War.

Draganowa was located adjacently to the so-called "Valley of Death" during the Battle of the Dukla Pass, with the neighboring village of Głojsce lying partly in the valley and gunshots being heard echoing in Draganowa. The battle between Kirill Moskalenko's Soviet 38th Army supported by Ludvík Svoboda's 1st Czechoslovak Army Corps on one side, and Gotthard Heinrici's German 1st Panzer Army on the other side, saw some of the most intense fighting of the Second World War. Draganowa is located close to Hill 534 in Franków where in September of 1944, hundreds of Soviet and German troops fell in the struggle to control the hill.

Large parts of the village's traditional wooden architecture were destroyed and had to be repaired or rebuilt after the war by the inhabitants, however the destruction was not as severe as in the neighboring Głojsce.

=== Polish People's Republic ===
Craft workshops are reopened: Władysław Świątek's forge and windmill, Szczepan Jastrzębski's second windmill, carpentry workshops run by Józef Jastrzębski, Tomasz Rymar, Władysław Pieknik, Henryk Węgrzyn, and Jan Wierdak, shoemaking workshops run by Alfred Skrzęta, Michał Wierdak, and Piotr Jastrzębski, and the glassworks run by Władysław Węgrzyn.

Oil shafts resume operation at the Draganowa Crude Oil Mine. Work was carried out in three shifts, with seven shafts in operation (the "Bitkowski" and "S.M." shafts), and percussion drilling was performed to depths of up to 1,500 meters. A treadmill operated, initially powered by hand, later by an electric motor. There was also a cable car. In 1950, electricity was brought to the mine. The mine's forge used natural gas extracted along with the oil. In 1958, after a borehole malfunction (nail damage), the mine was closed.

From 1947, a branch of the Polish Socialist Party (PPS) operated in Draganowa, and after the unification of the PPS and PPR, the Polish United Workers' Party (PZPR). The secretaries of the village POP included Stanisław Klecha, Władysław Kordyś, and Jan Jastrzębski. That same year, a branch of the agrarian ZSL was established in the village.

The village stands out in the area for its residents' social activity. On plots purchased with public funds, "community service" would hasten the construction of: a fire station, a school, a grocery store, two community centers (firstly wooden, later brick), garages for the agricultural association (firstly wooden, later brick), four kilometers of asphalt road, two bus stops, a concrete bridge, a church, and the second half of the school.

In 1952, the Postal and Telecommunications Agency was established in Draganowa. The post office was used by residents of Głojce, Sulistrowa, and Kobylany.

Also in 1952, the Volunteer Fire Department was founded, with 15 members. The firefighters had a hand-operated fire engine and a wagon with wooden wheels. The first commander was Stanisław Soliński.

In 1954, the entire village of Draganowa was electrified, and street lighting was installed in key areas of the village.

In 1957, one of the first brick fire stations in the Krosno County was built.

In 1958, the Draganowa Volunteer Fire Department's equipment was replaced with a motorized pump. The firefighters received new protective gear.

In 1959, a concrete bridge over the Iwielka stream was built in the village.

On October 31, 1974, the first sports club in Draganowa was founded. The Draganowa People's Sports Team was founded at that time. Its founders were Stanisław Węgrzyn, Edward Chomentowski, and Stanisław Frej. Two sections were established: football and volleyball.

The first football match was played on May 1, 1975, in Kobylany, as part of the village league. Draganowa defeated "Zryw" Kobylany 4-1. Stanisław Węgrzyn scored the first goal for LZS Draganowa. Boys from Draganowa played football in the surrounding villages of Iwla, Łęki Dukielskie, and Kobylany. On a plot of land purchased for the construction of the Teachers' House in Draganowa, the LZS built a volleyball court in 1975.

At the end of the 20th century, Draganowa's residents built a church, a community center (known as the "People's House"), and a new brick school. The first Mass was celebrated in the Church of Our Lady of the Rosary, built in 1985. The church was consecrated by Bolesław Taborski, Bishop of Przemyśl. The Draganowa Community Center, built in 1983, houses the village library, a reception hall, and a fire station.

=== Contemporary era ===
A newly built school opened in 1999. The school is small, single-story, with combined classes, and has just over 50 students.

== Gallery ==
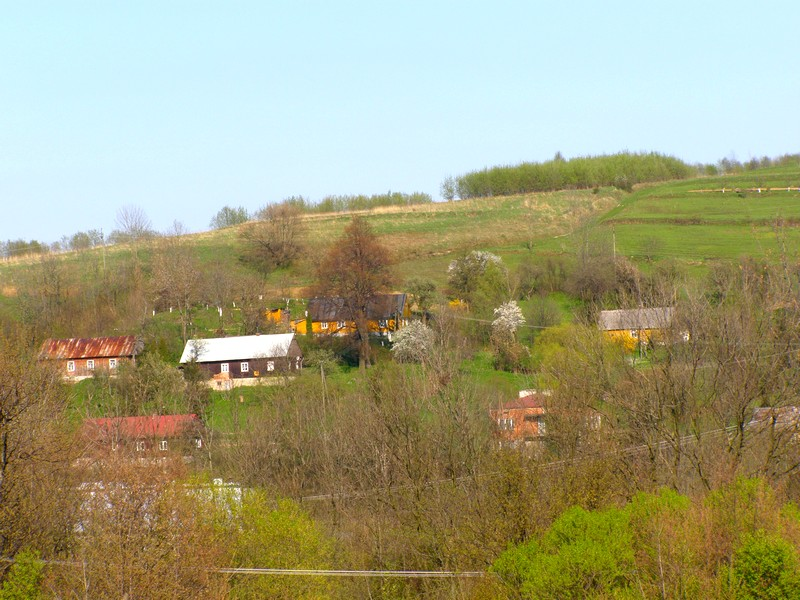
Wooden hillside cottages typical of Draganowa

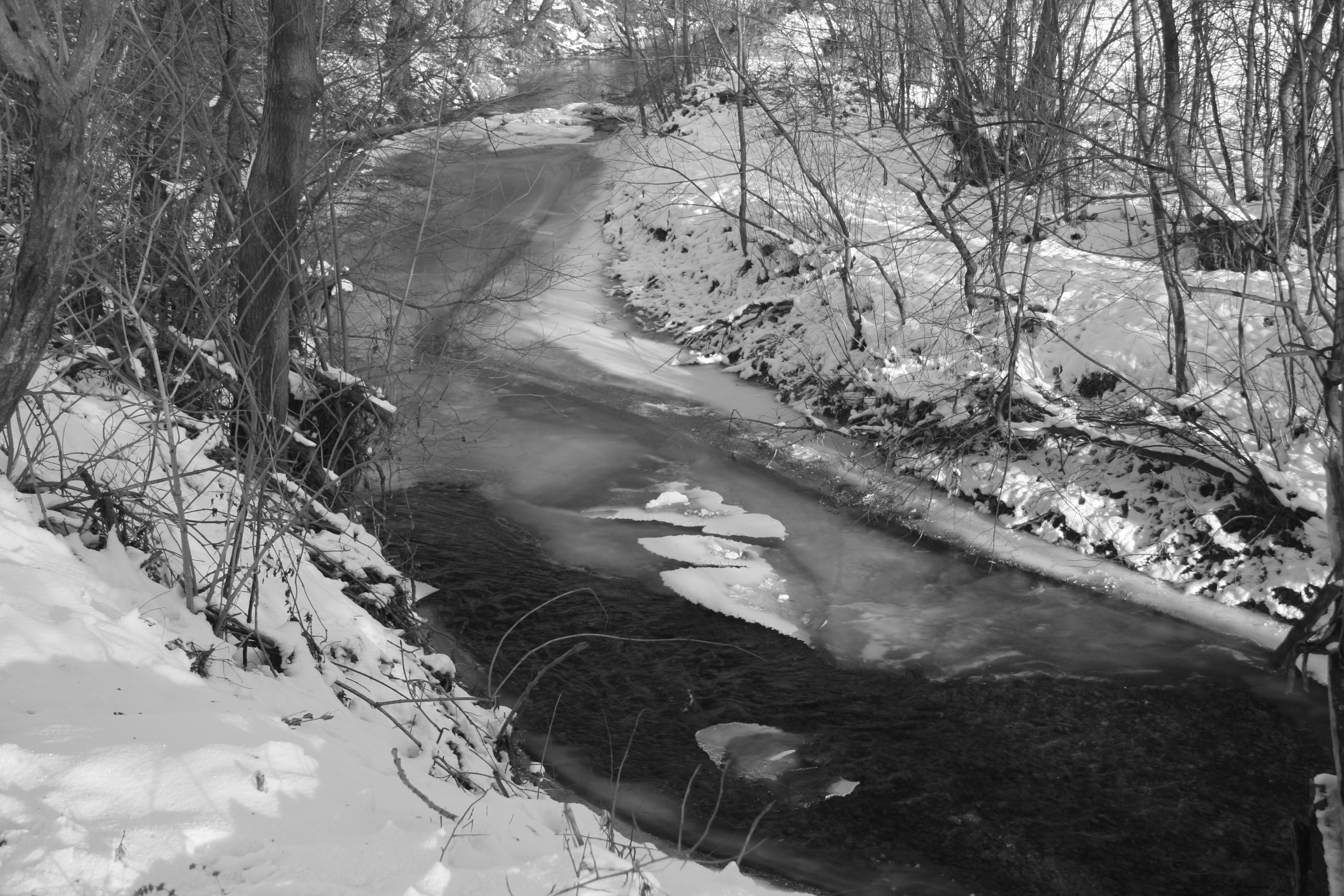
Iwielka stream in Draganowa

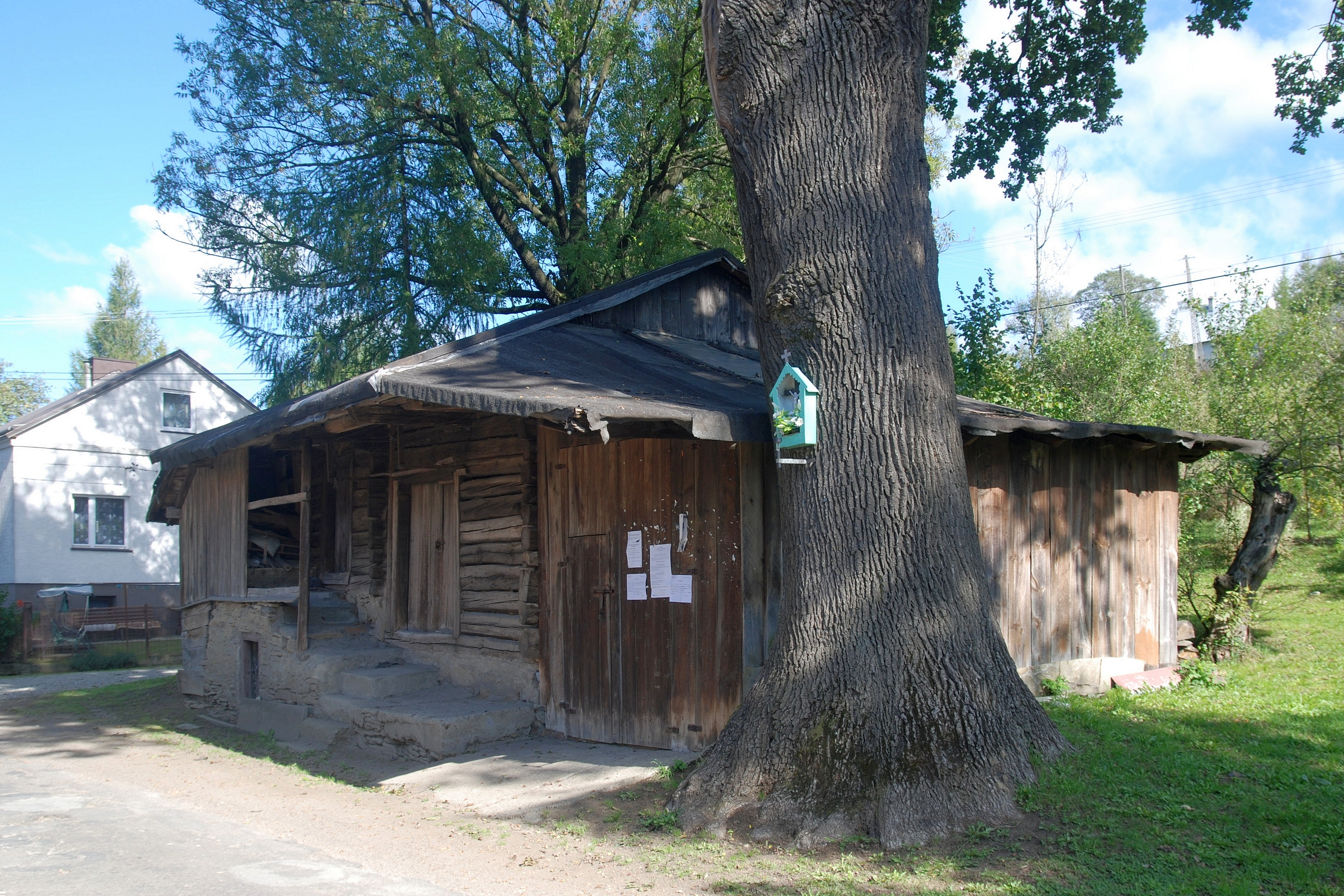
Old oak tree (site of natural and religious significance) and pre-war wooden building
