= Dukla (disambiguation) =

Dukla is a town in Poland.

Dukla may also refer to:

== Geography ==
- Gmina Dukla – urban-rural gmina in Poland
- Dukla Pass – mountain pass between Poland and Slovakia
  - Battle of the Dukla Pass (a.k.a. Dukla Offensive) – World War II battle
- Dukla Coal Mine – former coal mine in Dolní Suchá, the Czech Republic
- Duklja - Roman province (Dioclea), later Medieval Montenegrin state
- Duklja - Archaeological site near Podgorica, Montenegro

== Sports ==
=== Poland ===
- Przełęcz Duka – football club

=== Former Czechoslovakia ===
Various sports clubs in former Czechoslovakia were named Dukla in memory of the Battle of the Dukla Pass:

==== Czech Republic ====
- Dukla Prague – historic football club
- FK Dukla Prague – football club
- HC Dukla Prague – handball club
- HC Dukla Jihlava – ice hockey club
- VK Dukla Liberec – volleyball club
- Dukla Příbram – former name of football club 1. FK Příbram

==== Slovakia ====
- FK Dukla Banská Bystrica – football club
- HC Dukla Trenčín – ice hockey club
- Dukla Prešov – former name of football club 1. FC Tatran Prešov
- Dukla Trenčín – former name of football club FK AS Trenčín
