= Jewish cemetery in Dukla =

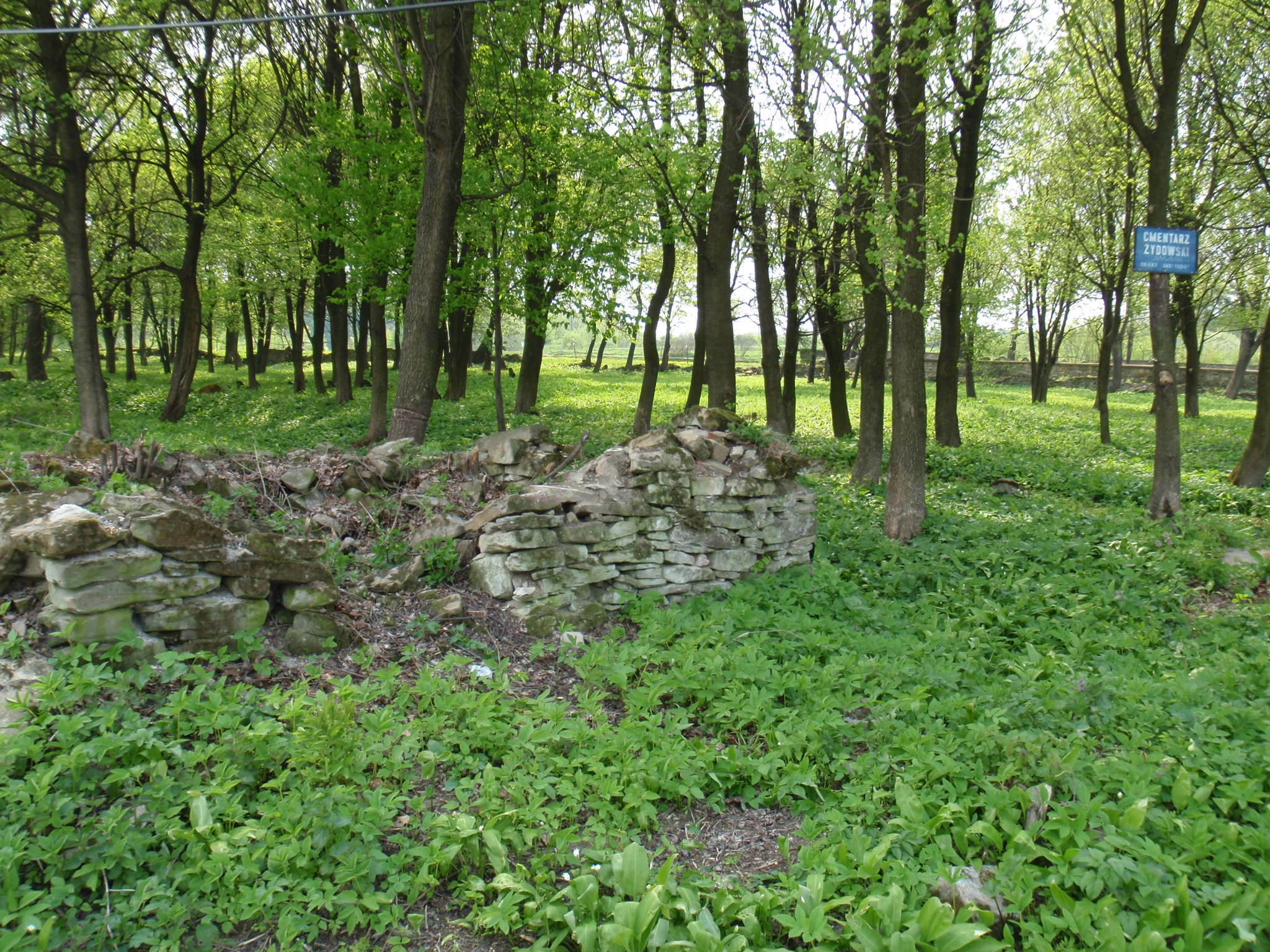
- General view of the Jewish cemeteries in Dukla. In the foreground are the ruins of the pre-burial house, behind them the old cemetery, and in the background the wall of the new cemetery
- Interactive map of Jewish cemetery in Dukla

Details
- Established: old part: 18th century new part: after 1870
- Location: Dukla; Poland
- Coordinates: 49°32′53″N 21°40′59″E
- Type: Jewish
- Size: 1.35 ha (3.3 acres)

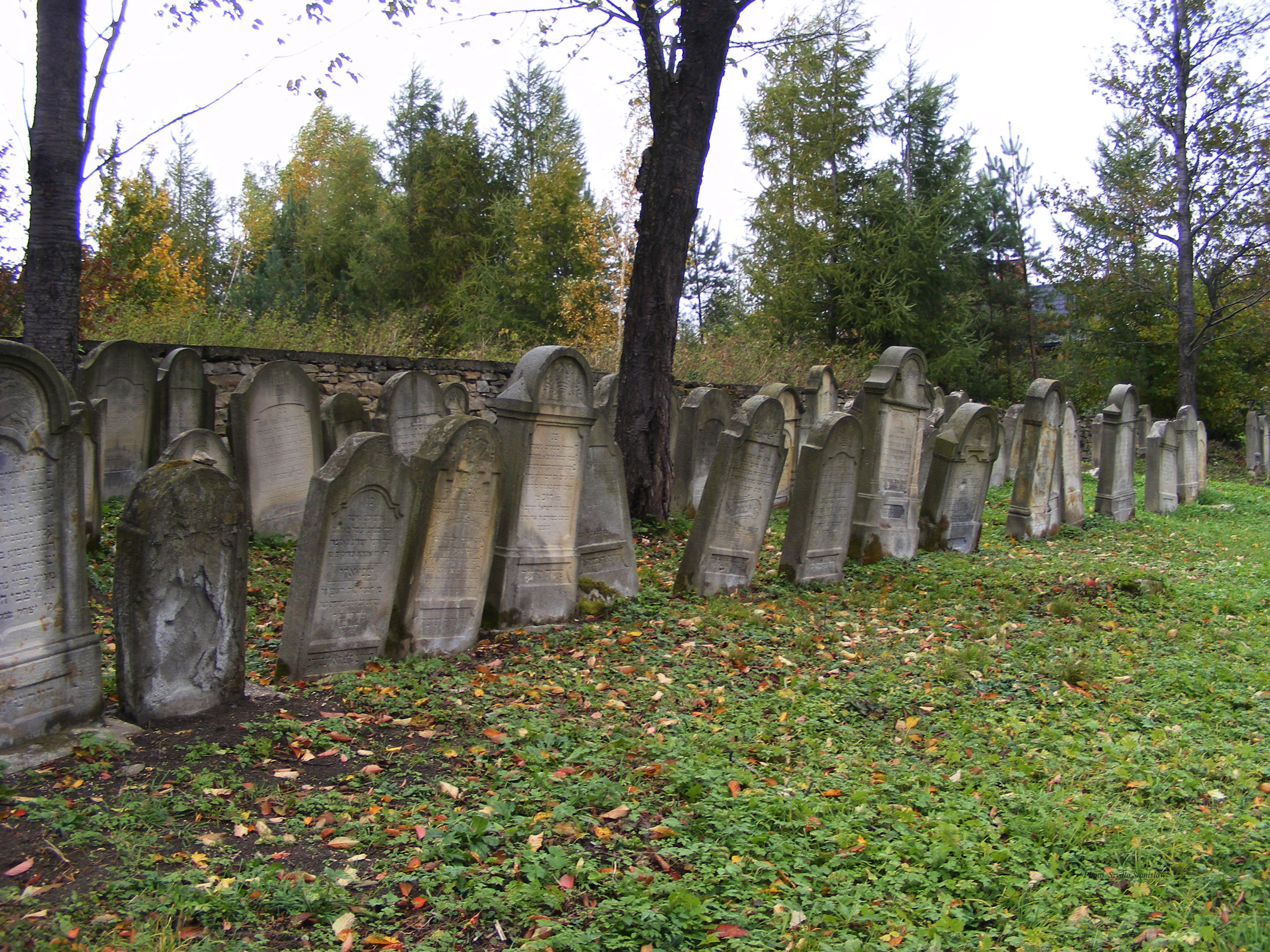
New Jewish cemetery in Dukla

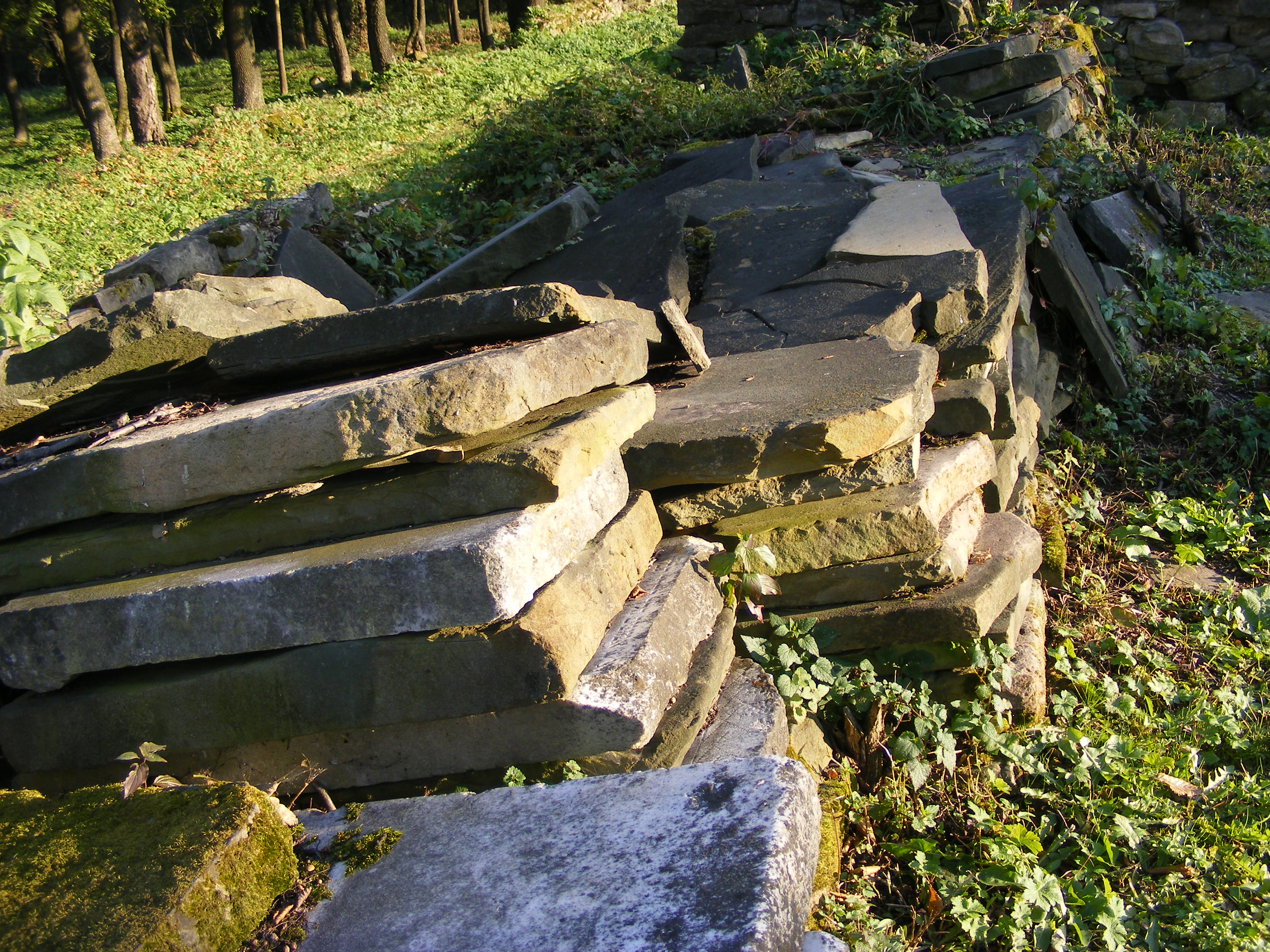
Prism of matzevot at the new Jewish cemetery in Dukla

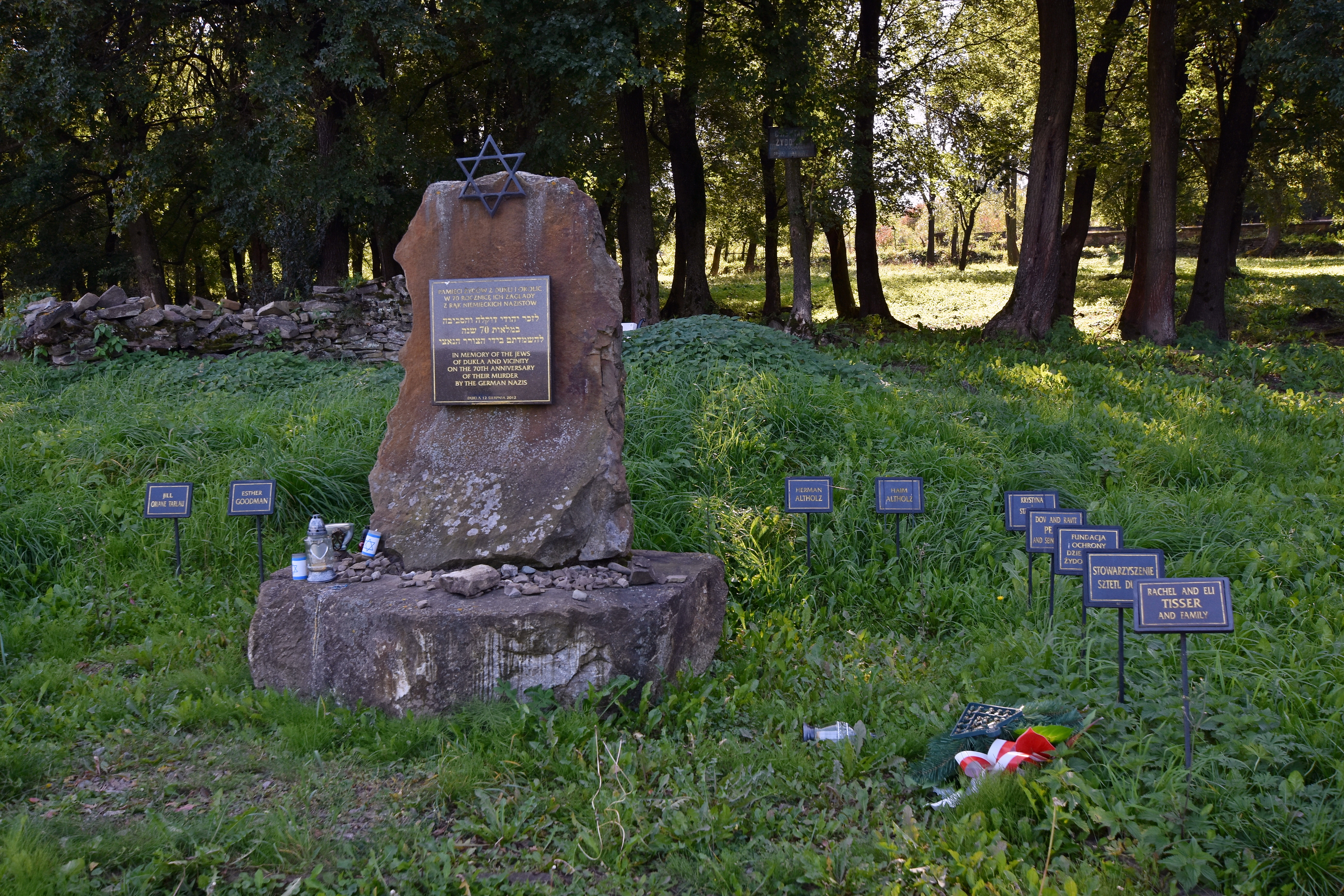
Old Jewish cemetery in Dukla

The Jewish cemetery in Dukla is a historic Jewish cemetery in Dukla, Poland located in the southern part of the town along Tadeusz Kościuszko Street. The cemetery consists of two parts. The older section likely dates to the 18th century, while the newer was established in 1870. It was destroyed by the Germans during World War II and was added to the register of historic monuments on 28 July 1989.

== Location ==
The Jewish Cemetery in Dukla is situated on the southern outskirts of the town along Kościuszko Street. The old section is trapezoidal in shape with an area of approximately 0.95 hectares, while the new section is rectangular with an area of about 0.4 hectares.

The old Jewish cemetery in Dukla is bordered to the north and west by low remnants of a stone wall, to the south by an unnamed stream − a tributary of the Jasiołka river, and to the east by a small ditch. Ruins of a pre-funeral house, of unknown construction date, stand in the northeastern corner. The new Jewish cemetery in Dukla is surrounded on all four sides by a stone wall, though it is incomplete and deteriorating. Entry to the new cemetery is through a preserved eastern gate. No trace remains of an entrance to the old cemetery.

== History ==
The old Jewish cemetery in Dukla was likely established in the early 18th century, while the new one dates to the 19th century and was used after 1870.

The establishment of the old cemetery and the later creation of the new one are closely tied to the robust development of the local Jewish community, founded in 1742. The earliest records of Jewish settlement in Dukla date to 1676. Prior to the formation of an independent community, Dukla Jews buried their dead in nearby towns with established qahals and cemeteries, such as Rymanów or Nowy Żmigród. The creation of the Dukla Jewish community enabled the founding of a cemetery. The old cemetery met the community's needs into the first half of the 19th century, when Jews comprised 51.5% of the town's population. By 1881, Dukla had 2,553 Jewish residents, or 84.2% of the total population, explaining the need for a new cemetery established a decade earlier to serve the growing community.

Little is known about the cemetery during World War I. It likely does not contain graves of fallen Jewish soldiers from the Austro-Hungarian army.

During World War II, the Germans removed many tombstones to regulate a stream in Smereczne and to build steps for a border guard post there. After the war, a State Agricultural Farm building replaced the guard post, but only ruins of its foundations remain today. On 12 February 1942, the Germans executed 11 Jews at the new Jewish cemetery in Dukla, burying them in a mass grave. It is unclear whether this is the only mass grave at the site.

The date of the last burial is uncertain. The Germans liquidated Dukla's Jewish community in July 1942, though 200 young men were retained as forced laborers. Until their transfer to the Rzeszów ghetto, the sick and weak were shot and likely buried at the cemetery. It is also possible that Jews executed in Dukla in September 1944, along with a farmer from Równe who hid them, were interred here.

== Notable burials ==
Due to the lack of a comprehensive study on the cemetery, information about those buried here is uncertain and based on indirect evidence:

- The wife of the tzadik Eleazar Shapiro of Łańcut came from Dukla, suggesting her parents, Jozue Heszel and his wife, may be buried here.
- Rabbi Joseph Samuel Bloch, a member of the Imperial Council and publisher of Österreichischer Wochenschrift, was from Dukla, implying his parents might be buried here.
- The parents of Helena Rubinstein, the cosmetics industry magnate, were from Dukla, suggesting their parents could be interred here.
- It is possible that local rabbis − Chaim Stroiz, Segal Weisman, and Szmul Engel − are buried in Dukla.
- Rabbi Pinchas Hirschprung, the last rabbi of Dukla and later a rabbi in Montreal, was from Dukla, making it plausible that his parents are buried here.

== Historic status ==
The preservation of the two cemetery sections varies. Estimates of surviving matzevot at the old cemetery range from a few dozen to about 100 or 200. The new cemetery has approximately 160, 200, or 300 tombstones, depending on the source. Tombstones at the new cemetery are in significantly better condition than those at the old one. Some tombstones and fragments at the new cemetery are piled in a prism in the southeastern section.

On 28 July 1989, the cemetery was added to the register of historic monuments by the National Institute of Cultural Heritage.
