= Olchowiec, Podkarpackie Voivodeship =

Olchowiec
- Village
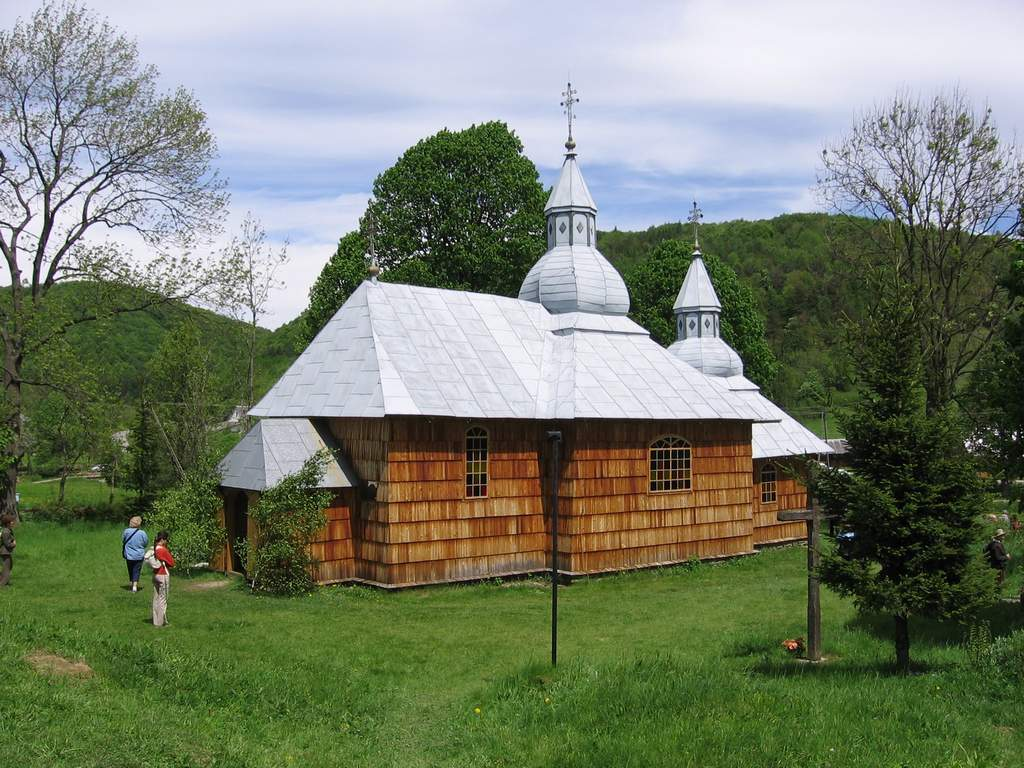
- Greek Catholic church

- Location within Poland
- Coordinates: 49°28′21″N 21°36′12″E
- Country: Poland
- Voivodeship: Subcarpathian
- County: Krosno
- Gmina: Dukla
- Population: 60

Olchowiec [ɔlˈxɔvʲɛt͡s] is a village in the administrative district of Gmina Dukla, within Krosno County, Subcarpathian Voivodeship, in south-eastern Poland, close to the border with Slovakia.

Prior to World War II, this village was populated primarily, if not entirely, by Lemkos. During the Battle of the Dukla Pass in September–October, 1944, the village was destroyed by military operations. In the ethnic cleansing of the Lemkos by the Communist government of Poland in Operation Vistula in 1947, Olchowiec was one of a very small number of Lemko villages - perhaps only two, the other being Komańcza - from which the Lemko population was not deported to northern or western Poland.

The Kermesz Łemkowski, an annual festival of Lemko culture is held in the village.
