= Jasionka, Gmina Dukla =

Jasionka
- Village
- Location within Poland
- Coordinates: 49°33′N 21°44′E
- Country: Poland
- Voivodeship: Subcarpathian
- County: Krosno
- Gmina: Dukla
- Population: 1,300

Jasionka [jaˈɕɔŋka] is a village in the administrative district of Gmina Dukla, within Krosno County, Subcarpathian Voivodeship, in south-eastern Poland, close to the border with Slovakia.

== See also ==
- Walddeutsche
