= Zawadka Rymanowska =

- Village
- Location within Poland
- Coordinates: 49°31′N 21°44′E
- Country: Poland
- Voivodeship: Subcarpathian
- County: Krosno
- Gmina: Dukla

Zawadka Rymanowska [zaˈvatka rɨmaˈnɔfska] is a village in the administrative district of Gmina Dukla, within Krosno County, Subcarpathian Voivodeship, in south-eastern Poland, close to the border with Slovakia.

The village was destroyed during conflicts in 1474 and was devastated by Hungarian forces in 1657. It also suffered damage during World War II.

From 1975 to 1998, Zawadka was administratively part of Krosno Voivodeship.
