= Krajná Poľana =

Municipality in Slovakia

- Municipality

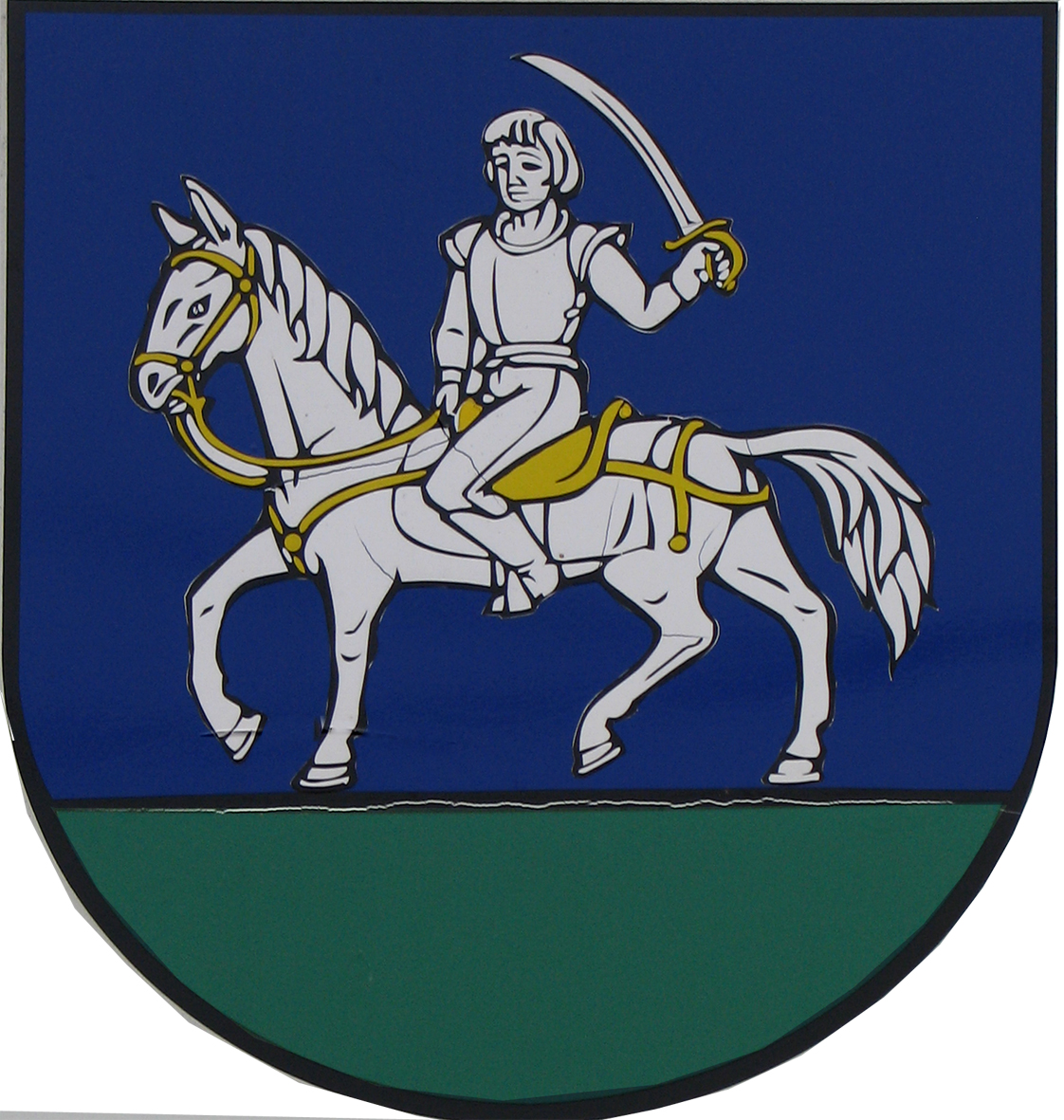
- Flag Coat of arms

- Location of Krajná Poľana in the Prešov Region Location of Krajná Poľana in Slovakia
- Coordinates: 49.36°N 21.69°E
- Country: Slovakia
- Region: Prešov Region
- District: Svidník District
- First mentioned: 1618

Area
  - Total: 2.94 km^{2} (1.14 sq mi)
- Elevation: 326 m (1,070 ft)

Population (2025)
  - Total: 229
- Time zone: UTC+1 (CET)
  - Summer (DST): UTC+2 (CEST)
- Postal code: 900 5
- Area code: +421 54
- Vehicle registration plate (until 2022): SK
- Website: krajnapolana.webnode.sk

Krajná Poľana (Rusyn: Крайня Поляна; Hungarian: Ladomérmező, until 1899: Krajnó-Polyána) is a village and municipality in Svidník District in the Prešov Region of north-eastern Slovakia.

== History ==
The village is first mentioned in historical records in 1618, and it is the oldest village in the region. The village was originally named Hunkovska Polana. From the late 18th Century all the way until the First World War the village was largely inhabited by Polish-speaking settlers from Barwinek, Tylawa and other villages located only a few miles to the north. Intermarriage between Poles and Slovaks was common. This ethnic mixing was made easier by the First Partition of Poland, as a result of which the Polish-Habsburg border on the Carpathian ridge disappeared.

== Geography ==
The municipality lies at an altitude of 326 metres (1,070 ft) and covers an area of 2.94 km^{2} (1.14 sq mi) (2025).

== Population ==
Population statistic (10 years)
Year	1995	2005	2015	2025
Count	245	208	216	229
Difference		−15.10%	+3.84%	+6.01%

Population statistic
Year	2024	2025
Count	227	229
Difference		+0.88%

It has a population of 229 people (31 December 2025).

=== Ethnicity ===
Census 2021 (1+%)
Ethnicity	Number	Fraction
Slovak	191	90.09%
Rusyn	39	18.39%
Romani	35	16.5%
Not found out	12	5.66%
Total	212	

In year 2021 was 212 people by ethnicity 191 as Slovak, 39 as Rusyn, 35 as Romani, 12 as Not found out and 2 as Moravian.

Note on population: The difference values of population numbers in the table "Population statistic" and in the sections "Ethnicity" & "Religion" is caused by the use of various statistical methods.

=== Religion ===
Census 2021 (1+%)
Religion	Number	Fraction
Greek Catholic Church	141	66.51%
Roman Catholic Church	31	14.62%
None	17	8.02%
Eastern Orthodox Church	11	5.19%
Not found out	11	5.19%
Total	212	

In year 2021 was 212 people by religion 141 from Greek Catholic Church, 31 from Roman Catholic Church, 17 from None, 11 from Eastern Orthodox Church, 11 from Not found out and 1 from Jehovah's Witnesses.

== Genealogical resources ==
The records for genealogical research are available at the state archive "Statny Archiv in Presov, Slovakia"

- Greek Catholic church records (births/marriages/deaths): 1823–1922 (parish B)

== See also ==
- List of municipalities and towns in Slovakia
