= Trzciana, Gmina Dukla =

Trzciana
- Village
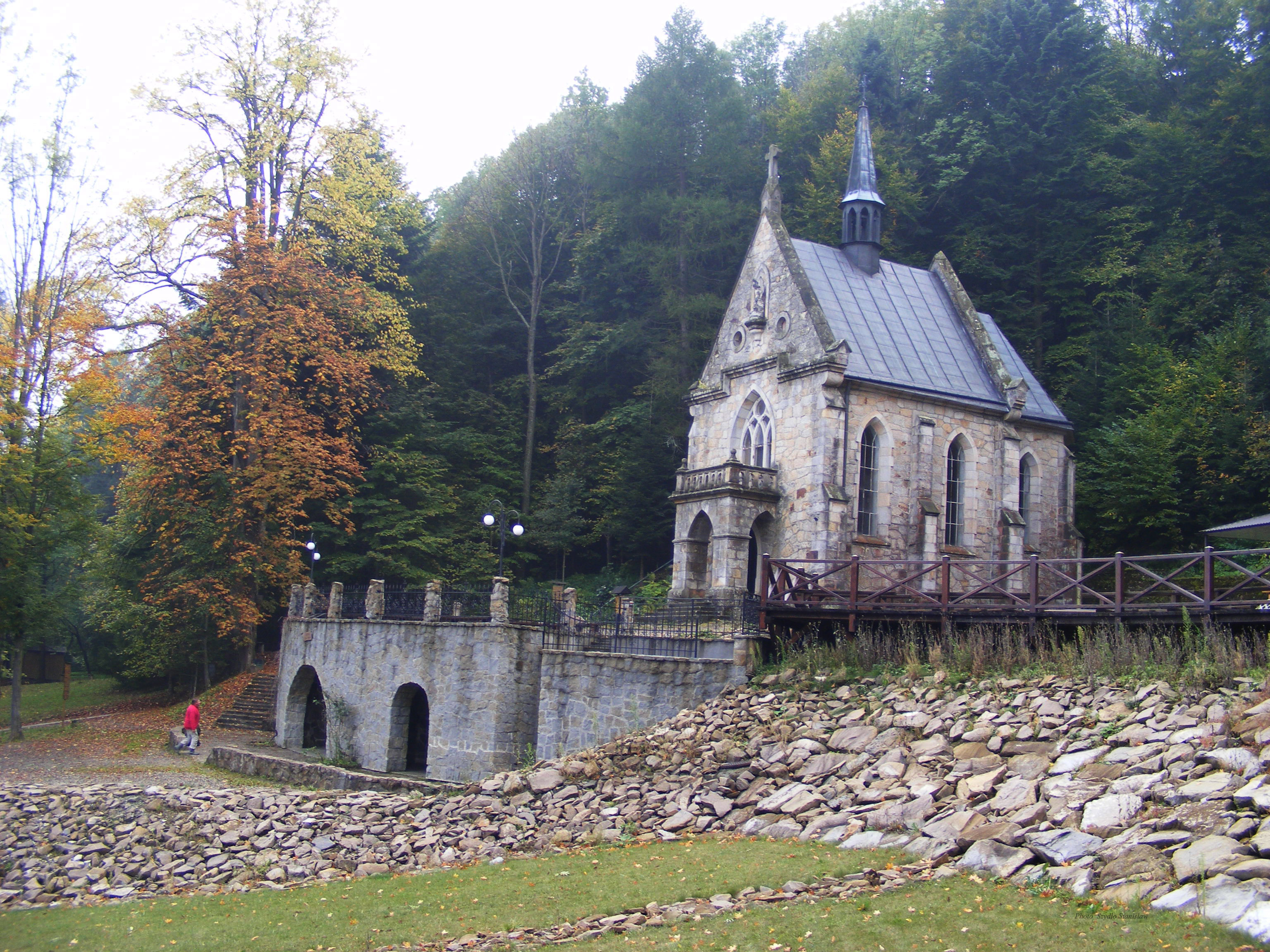
- Chapel of Saint John of Dukla

- Location within Poland
- Coordinates: 49°31′N 21°43′E
- Country: Poland
- Voivodeship: Subcarpathian
- County: Krosno
- Gmina: Dukla

Trzciana [ˈtʂt͡ɕana] is a village in the administrative district of Gmina Dukla, within Krosno County, Subcarpathian Voivodeship, in south-eastern Poland, close to the border with Slovakia.
