= Dukla =

Town in Subcarpathian Voivodeship, Poland

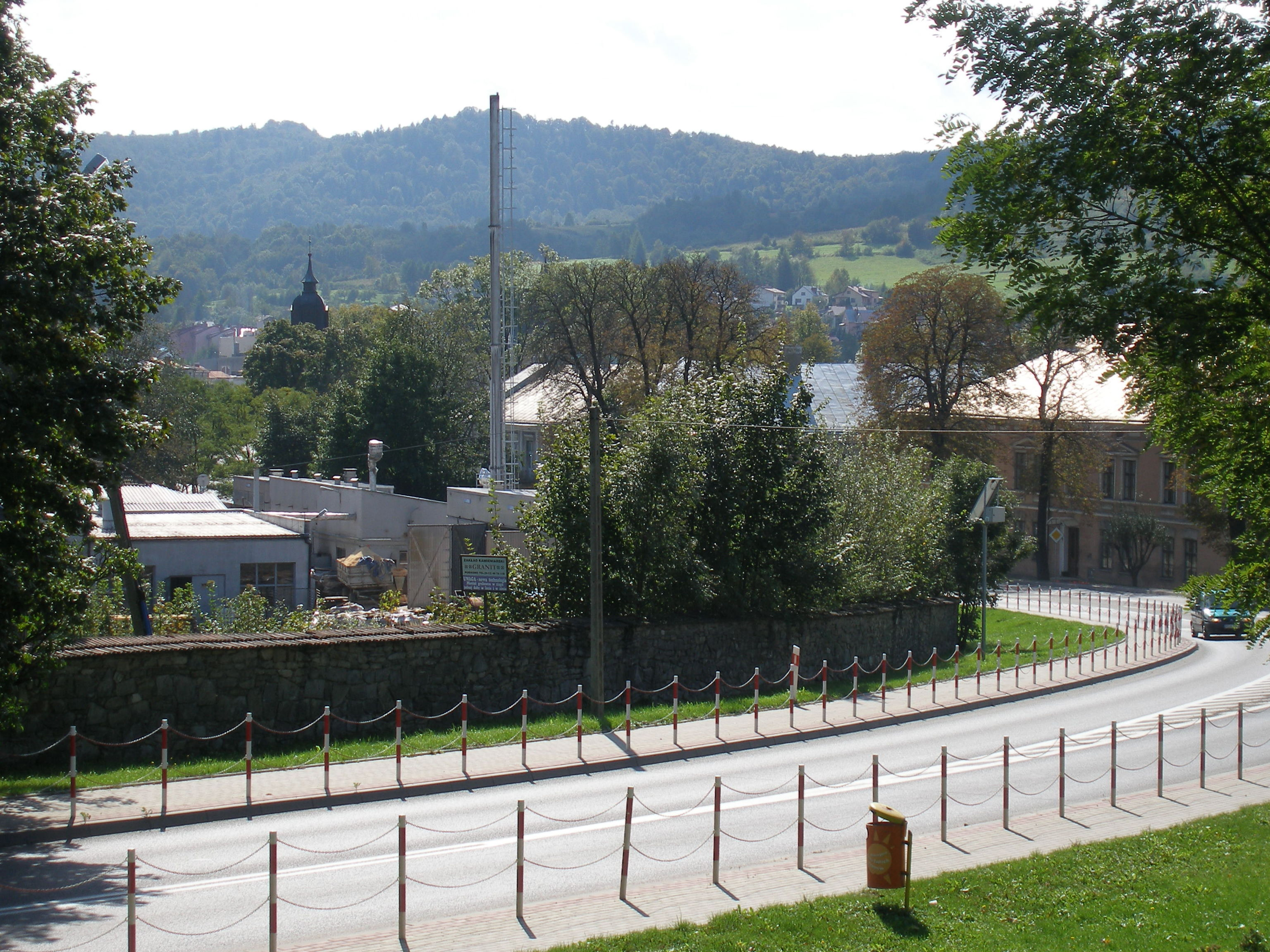
- Dukla

- Flag Coat of arms

- Location within Poland
- Coordinates: 49°34′N 21°41′E
- Country: Poland
- Voivodeship: Subcarpathian
- County: Krosno
- Gmina: Dukla

Government
  - Mayor: Krystyna Andruch

Area
  - Total: 5.48 km^{2} (2.12 sq mi)

Population (31 December 2021)
  - Total: 2,017
  - Density: 368/km^{2} (953/sq mi)
- Postal code: 38-450
- Area code: +48 13
- Car plates: RKR
- Website: http://www.dukla.pl

Dukla [ˈdukla] is a town and an eponymous municipality in southeastern Poland, in the Subcarpathian Voivodeship. As of December 2021, the town has a population of 2,017. The total area of the commune is 333.04 square kilometres (128.59 sq mi). Dukla belongs to Lesser Poland, and until the Partitions of Poland it was part of Biecz County, Kraków Voivodeship.

== Location ==
The town lies on the Jasiołka river and Dukiełka stream, at the foot of the Cergowa mountain (716 meters above sea level), in the Low Beskids. Dukla is located south of Krosno, along European route E371, which goes from Radom to Prešov. The Dukla mountain pass is located in the Carpathians, a few kilometers south of the town, on the border with Slovakia and was a scene of a major battle in 1944.

== History ==
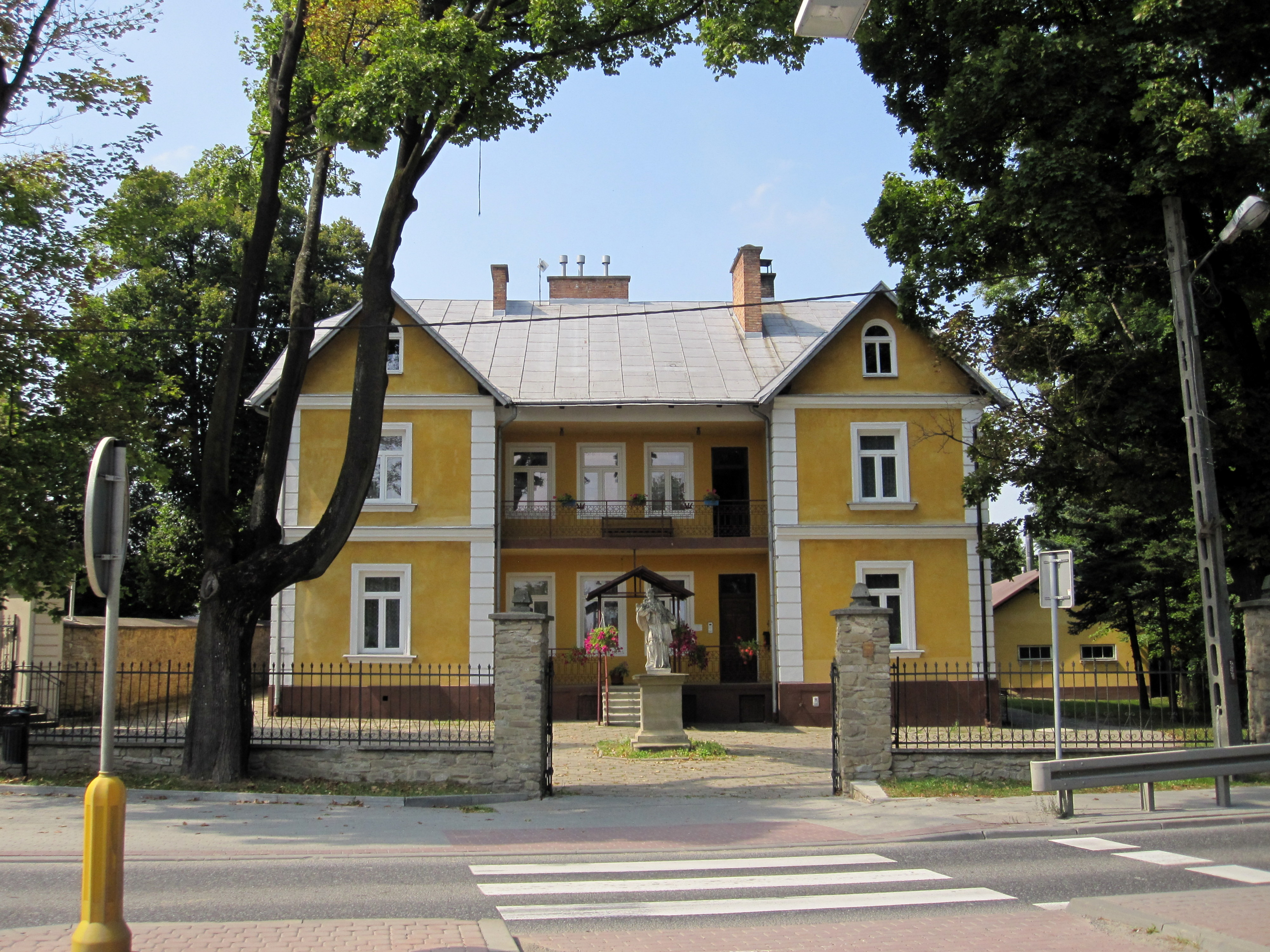
Historical building in town center

First Slavic settlers appeared in the area of Dukla probably in the 5th or 6th century. It is not known which tribe settled here, and most probably, Dukla belonged for some time to Great Moravia, although it is not documented. Some time in the 10th century, Dukla was annexed by the early Polish state, ruled by the Polans. In the nearby village of Wietrzno there was a defensive gord, whose traces can still be seen.

Dukla has belonged to several noble families, such as the Cikowski, Ossoliński, Potocki, Mniszech, Stadnicki, Męciński, and Tarnowski families. The village of Dukla was first mentioned in documents from 1336 as part of the lands gifted to Janusz Suchywilk by his relatives. In 1373, Dukla received Magdeburg rights charter, and the town was part of Kraków Voivodeship. In 1474, the town was destroyed in a raid of Hungarian army of King Matthias Corvinus. In 1540, Dukla was purchased by Jan Jordan of Zakliczyn (Trąby coat of arms). The new owner expanded the Dukla Palace, and received from King Sigismund I the Old a privilege, allowing him to organize two fairs a year. Dukla remained in the hands of the Jordan family until 1600, and in 1595, King Sigismund III established here a customs office. In 1601, the town was sold to Andrzej Męciński, who died in the Polish–Muscovite War (1605–1618). In 1636, Dukla was sold to Franciszek Bernard Mniszech, the brother of Tsaritsa of All Russia, Marina Mniszech.

In the early 17th century, Dukla emerged as an important center of commerce, located on a trade route joining Poland with Hungary. The town had a defensive wall with two towers, and a town hall. Its merchants traded Hungarian wine, which at that time was very popular among Polish nobility. In 1638, Franciszek Mniszech began construction of a new palace, which was completed by his son Jan Mniszech. On 2 January 1656, during the Swedish invasion of Poland, King John II Casimir came to Dukla, on his way from Silesia back to the occupied country. One year later, on 16 March 1657, Dukla was destroyed and looted by Transilvanian army of George II Rakoczi. After the wars, the town declined. Furthermore, Dukla was again destroyed in the Great Northern War, and its wooden houses burned in 1724, 1725, 1738, and 1758.

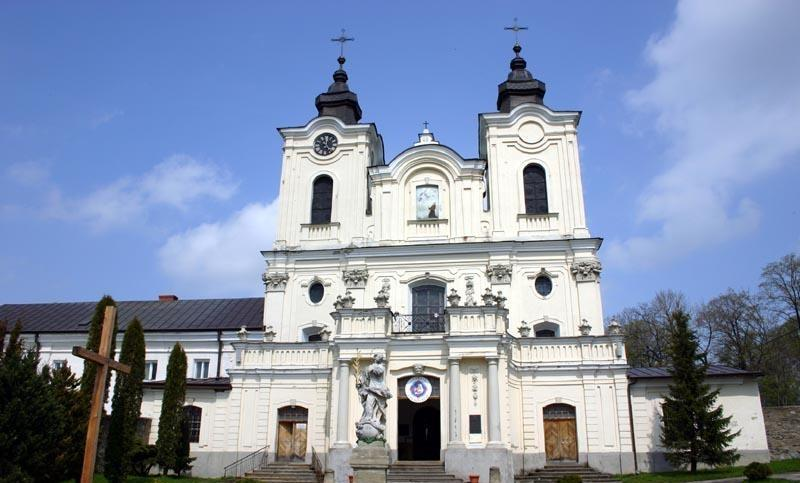
Bernadine Church

Since 1742, Dukla belonged to Jerzy August Mniszech, who in 1750 married Maria Amalia von Bruhl (the daughter of Heinrich von Bruhl). Together with his wife, Mniszech turned the town into a cultural center of the region, with a theatre, orchestra and a Masonic lodge. The Mniszechs competed with the Czartoryski family, which tried to turn their private town (Puławy in northern Lesser Poland) into the cultural capital of Poland (see also Izabela Czartoryska). In 1768 Jerzy Mniszech wrote a constitution for Dukla, in which he stated that all children were subject to education, regardless of their creed.

In the spring of 1768, Dukla was the center of Bar Confederation. Here all Lesser Poland's leaders of the rebellion gathered, and headed towards Rymanów, where on 6–7 July 1768, a general meeting of local aristocracy took place. Among the visitors at Dukla Palace was Casimir Pulaski, the father of American cavalry. In May 1772, after a number of skirmishes, Dukla was captured by Austrian soldiers, which marked the First Partition of Poland. The palace complex was used as military barracks, and Mniszech's private army was forced into the Austrian Army. Dukla lost its significance, and was replaced by nearby Jasło as the biggest town of the area. In 1849, Dukla was visited by Tsar Nicholas I of Russia, who intervened on behalf of the Habsburgs to suppress the uprising in Hungary. The town declined even further after the epidemics of cholera (1865–1867, 1873–1876, 1884–1885). Furthermore, the construction of railroads missed Dukla, and the town still does not have a rail station.

In December 1914, Dukla was captured by the Imperial Russian Army, which after the Battle of Galicia tried to break Austrian positions in the Carpathian Mountains, in order to invade Hungarian plains. The town was almost completely destroyed, and the Russians did not retreat until May 1915 (see Gorlice–Tarnów Offensive).

In the Second Polish Republic, Dukla belonged to Krosno County of Lwów Voivodeship. In the spring of 1939, Border Protection Corps Battalion Dukla was formed, to protect Polish–Slovak border. German occupation spelled the end of Jewish presence in the town, which dated back hundreds of years. In prewar Dukla, Jews were in the majority. Germans opened here a ghetto, which was liquidated on August 13, 1942, when some 500 Jews were shot near the village of Tylawa. In 1940, the 1758 synagogue was burned.

In 1944, the Battle of the Dukla Pass took place here, after which 90% of the town was in ruins. After the war, Dukla belonged to Rzeszów Voivodeship, and from 1975 to 1998 to Krosno Voivodeship. On 9 June 1997, the town was visited by Pope John Paul II, who mentioned his visits to Dukla as a young priest, and talked in his sermon about one of the most famous residents of the town, John of Dukla, one of the patron saints of Poland and Lithuania.

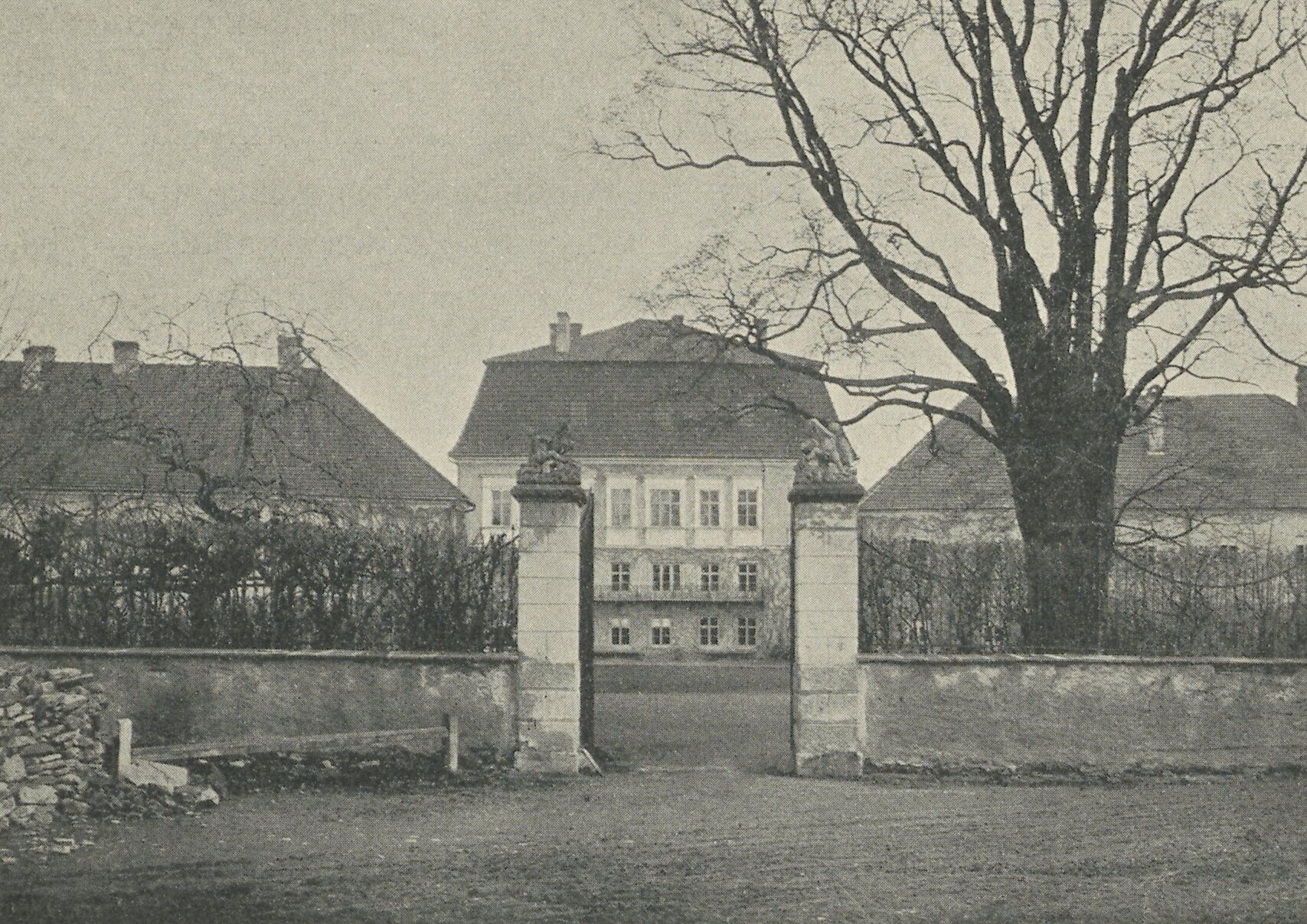
Mniszek's Palace (1903)

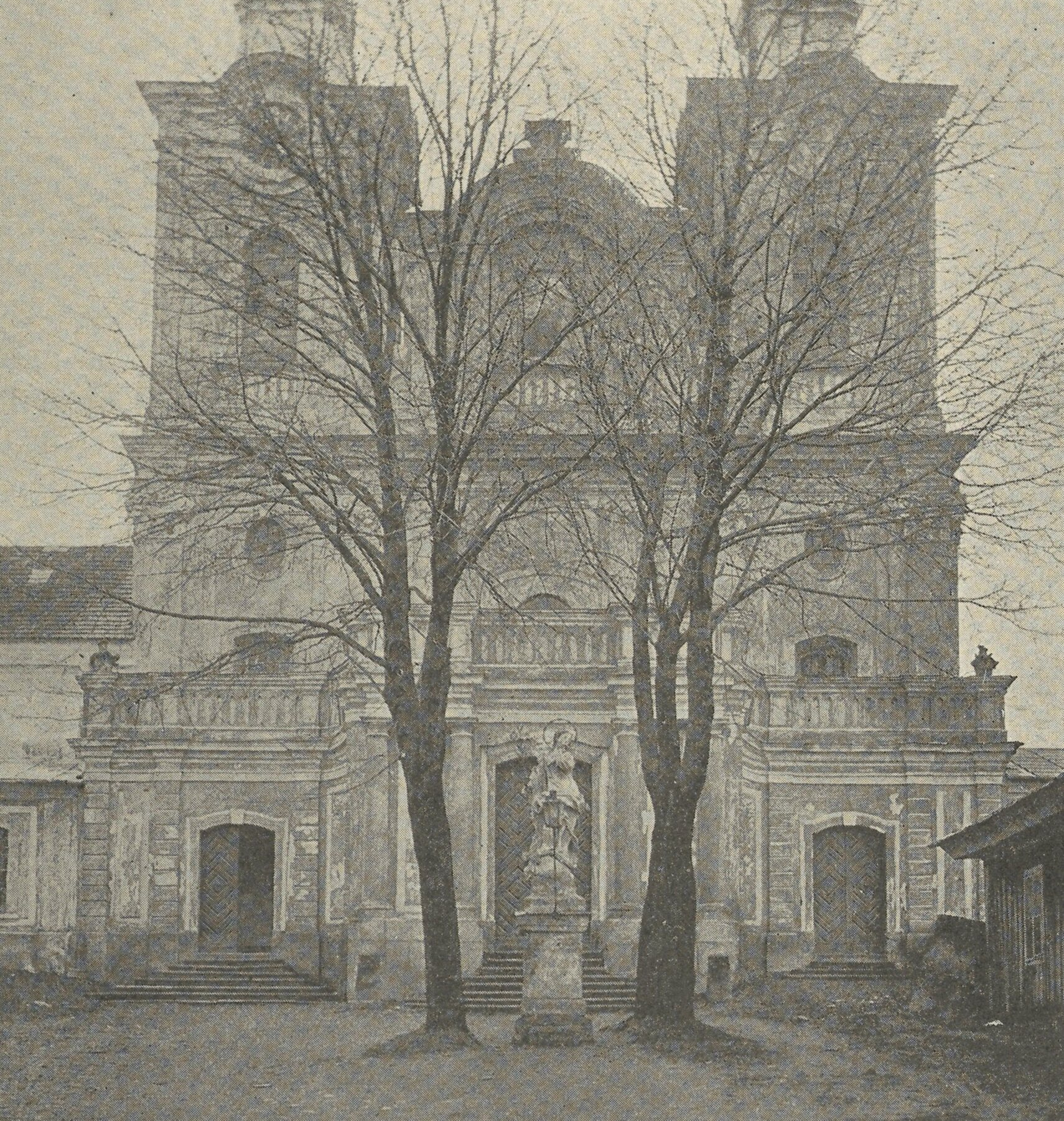
Bernardine Monastery (1903)

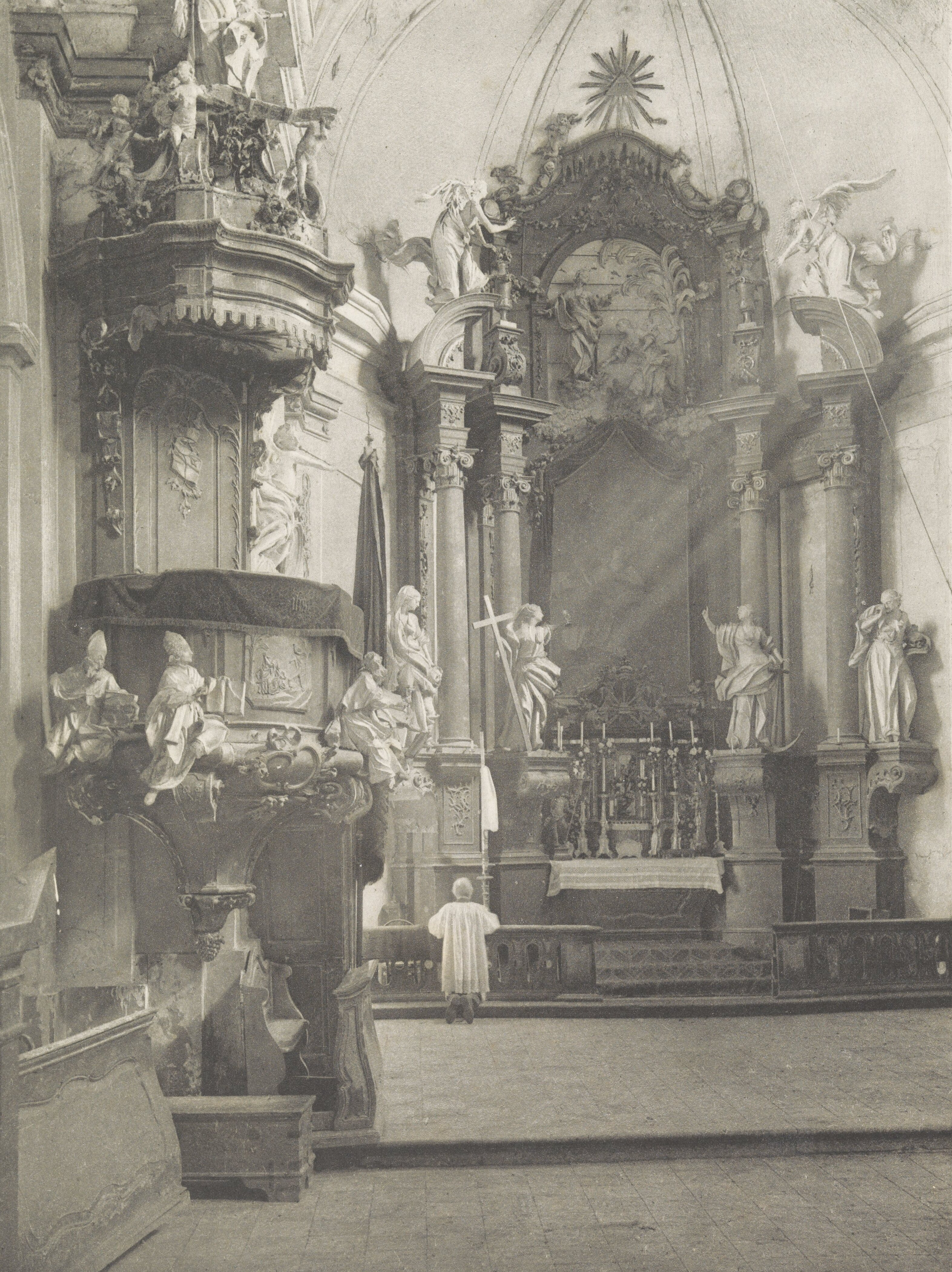
The interior of the St. Saint Mary Magdalene church (1903)

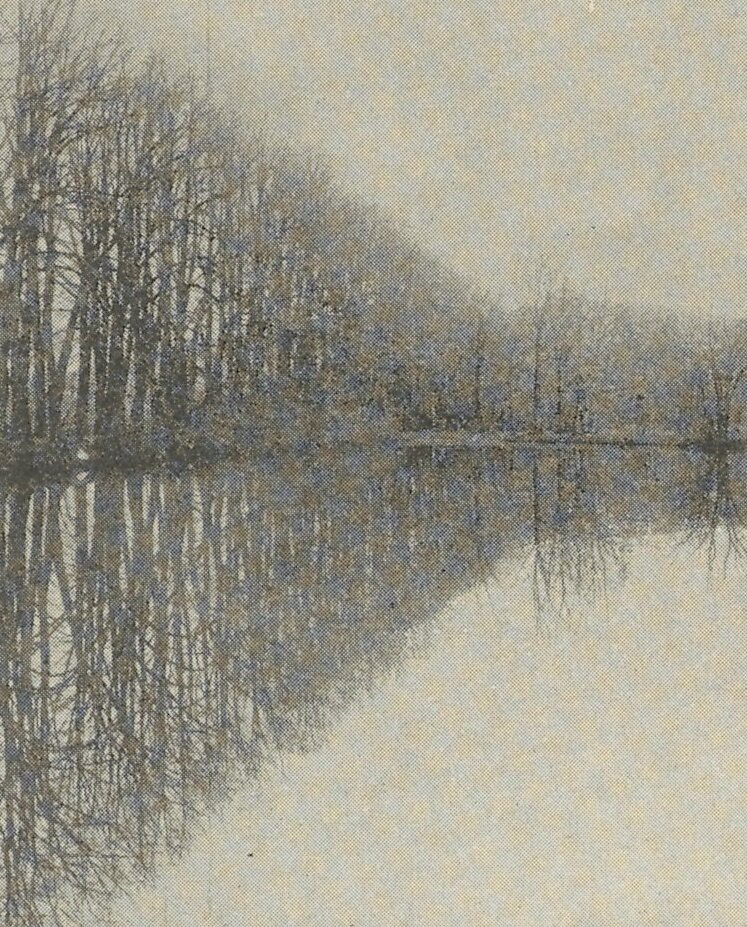
Ponds in the palace park (1903)

== Points of interest ==
- Market square with a Renaissance town hall (17th century);
- Ruins of a 16th-century border tax office;
- Ruins of a synagogue (1758);
- Dukla Palace with a park (1636). The palace was remodelled in 1764–65 by Jerzy August Mniszech and his wife Maria Amalia von Brühl. Currently, it serves as a History Museum, with World War II-era weapons on display, together with a small display of Tarnowski family memorabilia;
- Rococo St. Maria Magdalena parish church (1764), with tomb of Franciszek Stadnicki (1742–1810), and Maria Amalia von Brühl;
- Complex of a Bernardine abbey and church (1731), with the church itself built in 1761–1764. In the church there is the coffin of St. John of Dukla;
- Ruins of a brewery (1750–1799);
- Park chapel (1875) for the Męcinski family;
- World War I and World War II cemetery;
- Jewish cemetery.

== Notable people ==
- Alfred Biesiadecki (1839–1889), Polish pathologist
- Joseph Samuel Bloch, Austrian Rabbi
- John of Dukla, Polish Saint in Roman Catholic Church

== Hiking trails ==
- European walking route E8
  - Prešov - Mihaľov - Kurimka - Dukla - Iwonicz-Zdrój - Rymanów-Zdrój - Puławy - Tokarnia (778 m) - Kamień (717 m) – Komańcza - Cisna - Ustrzyki Górne - Tarnica - Wołosate.
