= Zboiska =

Zboiska may refer to the following villages in Poland:

- Zboiska, Masovian Voivodeship (east-central Poland)
- Zboiska, Gmina Dukla, Krosno County in Subcarpathian Voivodeship (south-east Poland)
- Zboiska, Sanok County in Subcarpathian Voivodeship (south-east Poland)
- Zboiska, Lwów - a Polish name of a former village, currently a district in Lviv, Ukraine
