= Nadole, Podkarpackie Voivodeship =

Nadole
- Village
- Location within Poland
- Coordinates: 49°33′30″N 21°39′59″E
- Country: Poland
- Voivodeship: Subcarpathian
- County: Krosno
- Gmina: Dukla
- Population: 140

Nadole [naˈdɔlɛ] is a village in the administrative district of Gmina Dukla, within Krosno County, Subcarpathian Voivodeship, in south-eastern Poland, close to the border with Slovakia.
