= Nowa Wieś, Gmina Dukla =

Nowa Wieś
- Village
- Location within Poland
- Coordinates: 49°31′37″N 21°41′31″E
- Country: Poland
- Voivodeship: Subcarpathian
- County: Krosno
- Gmina: Dukla
- Population: 220

Nowa Wieś [ˈnɔva ˈvʲɛɕ] is a village in the administrative district of Gmina Dukla, within Krosno County, Subcarpathian Voivodeship, in south-eastern Poland, close to the border with Slovakia.
