= Lipowica, Podkarpackie Voivodeship =

Lipowica
- Village
- Location within Poland
- Coordinates: 49°32′25″N 21°41′35″E
- Country: Poland
- Voivodeship: Subcarpathian
- County: Krosno
- Gmina: Dukla
- Population: 284

Lipowica [lʲipɔˈvʲit͡sa] is a village in the administrative district of Gmina Dukla, within Krosno County, Subcarpathian Voivodeship, in south-eastern Poland, close to the border with Slovakia.
