= Battle of the Dukla Pass =

Conflict on the Eastern Front of World War II

- Part of the Eastern Front of World War II
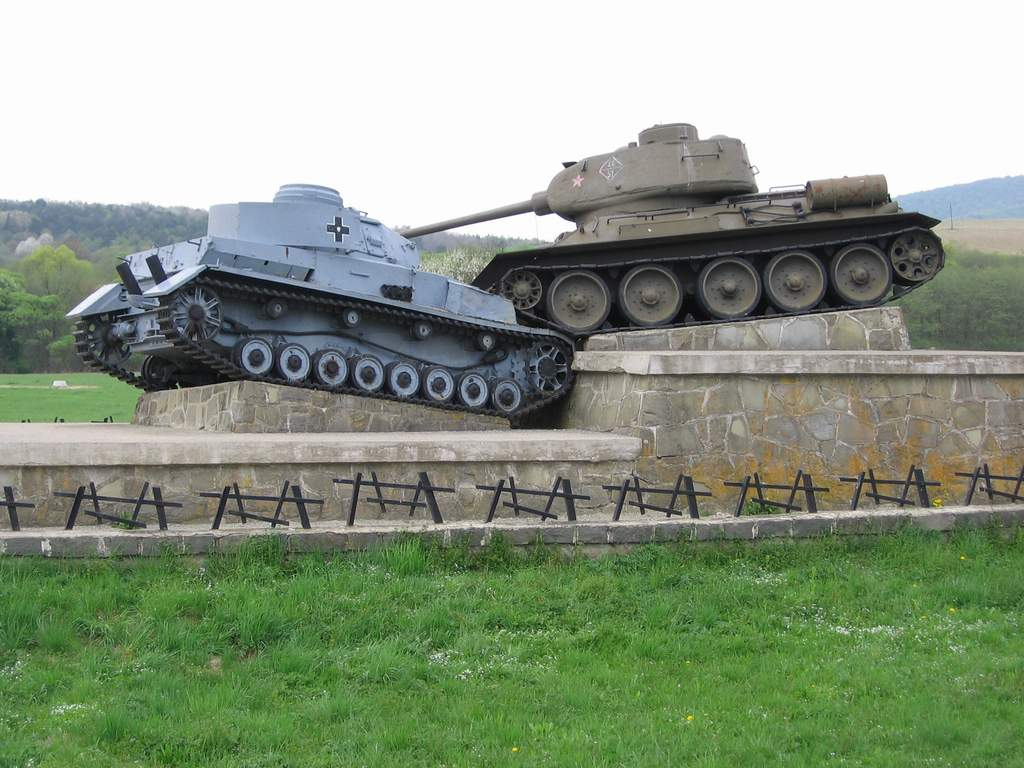
- A monument to the battle on the Slovak side of the Dukla Pass.
Date	8 September – 28 October 1944
Location	Dukla Pass, present-day Slovakia-Poland border 49°25′03″N 21°41′58″E
Result	Inconclusive; Soviet failure to join Slovak rebel troops; Eventual Axis withdrawal from the area

Belligerents
Germany; Hungary (Note: Government of National Unity after Operation Panzerfaust.)	Soviet Union; Czechoslovakia

Commanders and leaders
(Nazi Germany) Gotthard Heinrici (Kingdom of Hungary (1920–1946)) Béla Miklós (8–16 Oct 1944) (Kingdom of Hungary (1920–1946)) Dezső László (16 Oct – 28 Oct 1944)	(Soviet Union) Ivan Konev (Soviet Union) Andrei Grechko (Soviet Union) Kirill Moskalenko (Czechoslovakia) Ludvík Svoboda

Strength
100,000 soldiers 2,000 artillery pieces 350 tanks	(Soviet Union) 378,000 men (Czechoslovakia) 16,700 men 1,517 artillery pieces 1,724 mortars 1,000 tanks

Casualties and losses
61,000 (Czech estimates); 70,000 (modern Russian estimates)	Soviet Union: 10,060 killed 41,387 wounded 13,548 sick 1,806 missing (modern Czech estimates); 131,000 (German historian Freiser); Czechoslovakia: 935 killed 4,518 wounded 756 missing

The Battle of the Dukla Pass, also known as the Dukla, Carpatho–Dukla, Rzeszów–Dukla, or Dukla–Prešov offensive, was the battle for control over the Dukla Pass on the border between Poland and Slovakia on the Eastern Front of World War II between Nazi Germany and the Soviet Union in September–October 1944. It was part of the Soviet east Carpathian strategic offensive that also included the Carpathian–Uzhgorod offensive. The operation's primary goal, to provide support for the Slovak National Uprising, was not achieved, but it concluded the full liberation of the Ukrainian SSR.

The German resistance in the eastern Carpathian region was much stronger than expected. The battle which began on 8 September would not see the Soviet forces on the other side of the pass until 6 October, and German forces would stop their heavy resistance in the region only around 10 October. Five days to Prešov turned into fifty days to Svidník alone with over 70,000 casualties on both sides. Prešov that was to be reached in six days remained beyond the Czechoslovaks' grasp for four months. The battle would be counted among the most bloody in the entire Eastern Front and the history of Slovakia; one of the valleys in the pass, near the villages of Kapišová, Chyrowa, Iwla, and Głojsce, would become known as the "Valley of Death".

== Background ==
In summer 1944, Slovaks rebelled against the Nazis and the Czechoslovak government appealed to Soviets for help. On 31 August, Soviet marshal Ivan Konev was ordered to prepare plans for an offensive to destroy Nazi forces in Slovakia. The plan was to push through the old Slovak-Polish border in the Carpathian Mountains via the Dukla Pass near Svidník to penetrate Slovakia proper.

In the meantime, however, the Germans had fortified the region, forming the Karpatenfestung ("Carpathian fortress") or Árpád Line.

== Battle ==
The Soviet operation plan called for the Soviet forces to cross the pass and capture the town of Prešov within five days.

The operation started on 8 September. It took the Soviets three days to take Krosno (it was liberated on 11 September). One of the biggest battles in the pass took place on and around Hill 534 in the northwest from the town of Dukla; the battle to capture this hill lasted from 10 to 20 September, and during that period the control of the hill changed more than 20 times. The town of Dukla was liberated on 21 September. The area of the former Czechoslovak state border—heavily fortified by the Germans—was liberated on 6 October; it took almost a month for the Soviet forces to reach Slovakia.

The Dukla operation did not end when the Soviets forced the pass. The combat zone shifted to Eastern Slovakia, with Soviet forces trying to outflank and push back the German forces, still strong and having many fortified positions. South of the pass and directly west of the village of Dobroslava lies an area that has come to be known as the "Valley of Death". Here Soviet and German armor clashed in a miniature reenactment of the great tank Battle of Kursk. Soviet and Czechoslovak forces would enter Svidník on 28 October. A major German fortified position near the pass, Hill 532 "Obšár", would be secured as late as on 25 November 1944.

== Aftermath ==
The Slovak National Uprising had been mostly crushed by the time Soviet units secured Slovak territories; one of the main reasons for this was that the German resistance in the Dukla Pass was much heavier than expected. Another factor was that the Slovak insurgent forces failed to secure the other side of the pass, as planned by the Slovak and Soviet commanders during early preparations.

In 1949, the Czechoslovak government erected a memorial and cemetery southeast of the Dukla border crossing in Vyšný Komárnik village. It contains the graves of several hundred Soviet and Czechoslovak soldiers. Several other memorials and cemeteries have also been erected in the region.

In 1956, the football club ATK Praha changed their name to Dukla Praha (Dukla Prague) in honour of those who had fallen in the battle.

In October 2024, an article in Czech news was published reviewing 80 years since the battle took place. According to the article 617 Czech soldiers of the 2,000 killed during the battle are not mentioned on any memorial. The article also stated the Ministry of Defence wants to build a memorial in honour of those soldiers in Poland.

== Order of battle ==
=== Soviet Union ===
- Elements of 1st Ukrainian Front, Marshal Ivan Konev commanding
  - 38th Army (Kirill Moskalenko)
  - Czechoslovak 1st Army Corps (Ludvík Svoboda)
- Elements of 4th Ukrainian Front:
  - Soviet 1st Guards Army (Andrei Grechko)

=== Germany ===
- Army Group Heinrici
  - 1st Panzer Army (Gotthard Heinrici)
  - Elements of Hungarian First Army (Dezső László)
