= Trzciana =

Trzciana may refer to the following places:

- Trzciana, Lesser Poland Voivodeship (south Poland)
- Trzciana, Gmina Dukla, Krosno County in Subcarpathian Voivodeship (south-east Poland)
- Trzciana, Mielec County in Subcarpathian Voivodeship (south-east Poland)
- Trzciana, Rzeszów County in Subcarpathian Voivodeship (south-east Poland)
- Trzciana, West Pomeranian Voivodeship (north-west Poland)
