= Wilsznia =

- Village
- Location within Poland
- Coordinates: 49°28′N 21°39′E
- Country: Poland
- Voivodeship: Subcarpathian
- County: Krosno
- Gmina: Dukla

Wilsznia [ˈvilʂɲa] is a village in the administrative district of Gmina Dukla, within Krosno County, Subcarpathian Voivodeship, in south-eastern Poland, close to the border with Slovakia.
