= Powiat krośnieński =

Powiat krośnieński may refer to either of two counties (powiat) in Poland:

- Krosno County, Podkarpackie Voivodeship (SE Poland)
- Krosno County, Lubusz Voivodeship (W Poland)
