= Smereczne =

- Village
- Location within Poland
- Coordinates: 49°27′55″N 21°39′30″E
- Country: Poland
- Voivodeship: Subcarpathian
- County: Krosno
- Gmina: Dukla

Smereczne [smɛˈrɛt͡ʂnɛ] is a village in the administrative district of Gmina Dukla, within Krosno County, Subcarpathian Voivodeship, in south-eastern Poland, close to the border with Slovakia.
