= Równe, Podkarpackie Voivodeship =

Równe
- Village
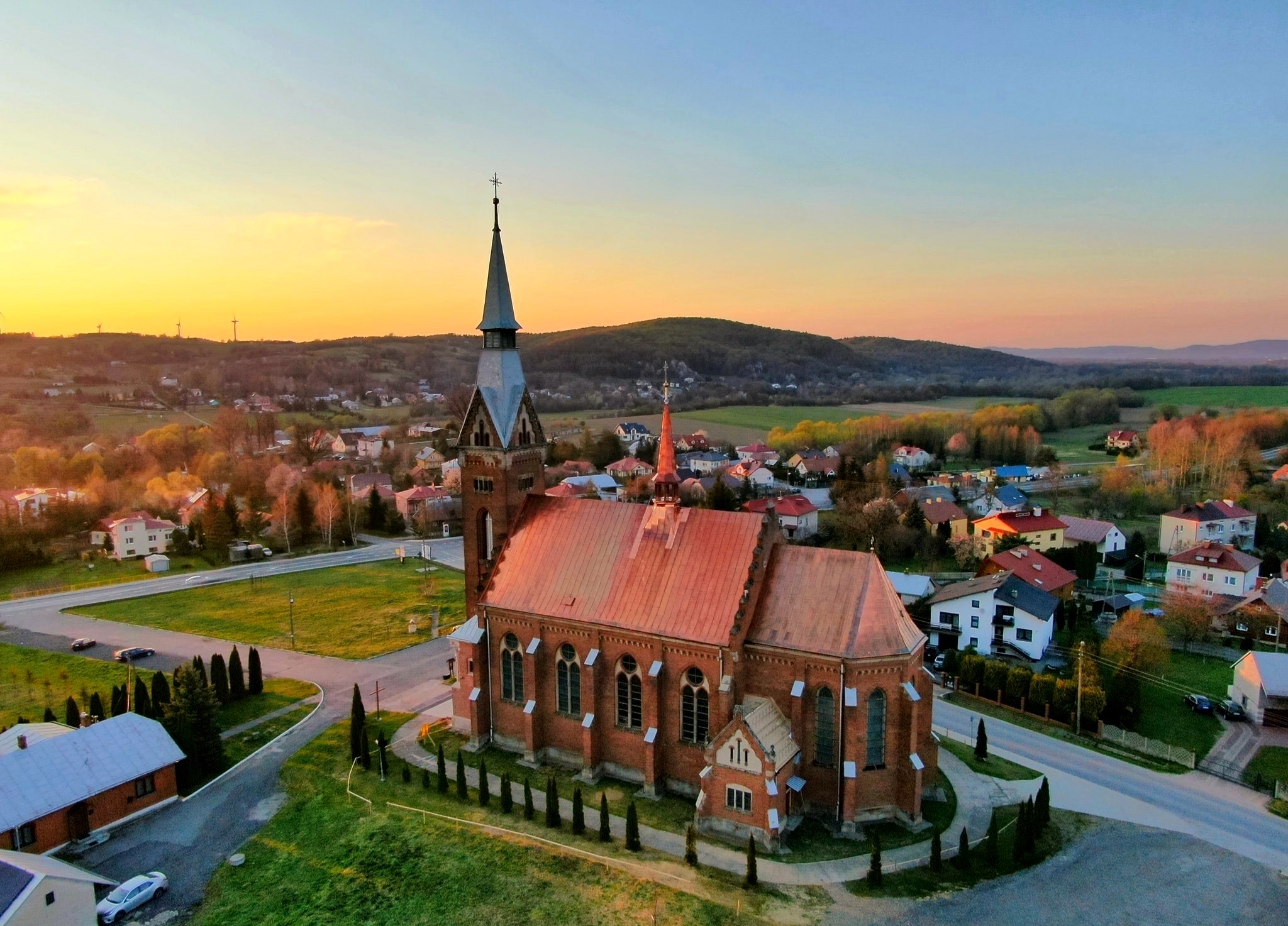
- Aerial view of Równe

- Location within Poland
- Coordinates: 49°35′44″N 21°43′2″E
- Country: Poland
- Voivodeship: Subcarpathian
- County: Krosno
- Gmina: Dukla
- Founded: 1352

Population
  - Total: 2,000
- Time zone: UTC+1 (CET)
  - Summer (DST): UTC+2 (CEST)
- Postal code: 38-451
- Vehicle registration: RKR

Równe [ˈruvnɛ] is a village in the administrative district of Gmina Dukla, within Krosno County, Subcarpathian Voivodeship, in south-eastern Poland, close to the border with Slovakia.

The village was founded in 1352 by King Casimir III the Great.
