= Łęki Dukielskie =

- Village
- Location within Poland
- Coordinates: 49°36′16″N 21°40′11″E
- Country: Poland
- Voivodeship: Subcarpathian
- County: Krosno
- Gmina: Dukla
- Population: 1,700

Łęki Dukielskie (Polish pronunciation: [ˈwɛŋkʲi duˈkʲɛlskʲɛ]) is a village in the administrative district of Gmina Dukla, within Krosno County, Subcarpathian Voivodeship, in south-eastern Poland, close to the border with Slovakia.

Łęki Dukielskie has two churches: one is Roman Catholic and the second is National Polish Church.

In 2009 five wind farming turbines was constructed on the village hills area. Wind turbines measure 100 metres high and they are one of the highest existing in Poland.
