= Zboiska, Gmina Dukla =

Zboiska
- Village
- Location within Poland
- Coordinates: 49°34′13″N 21°41′40″E
- Country: Poland
- Voivodeship: Subcarpathian
- County: Krosno
- Gmina: Dukla
- Population: 380

Zboiska [ˈzbɔi̯ska] is a village in the administrative district of Gmina Dukla, within Krosno County, Subcarpathian Voivodeship, in south-eastern Poland, close to the border with Slovakia.
