= Dukla Pass =

Mountain pass on the border between Poland and Slovakia

Coordinates: 49.418°N 21.696°E

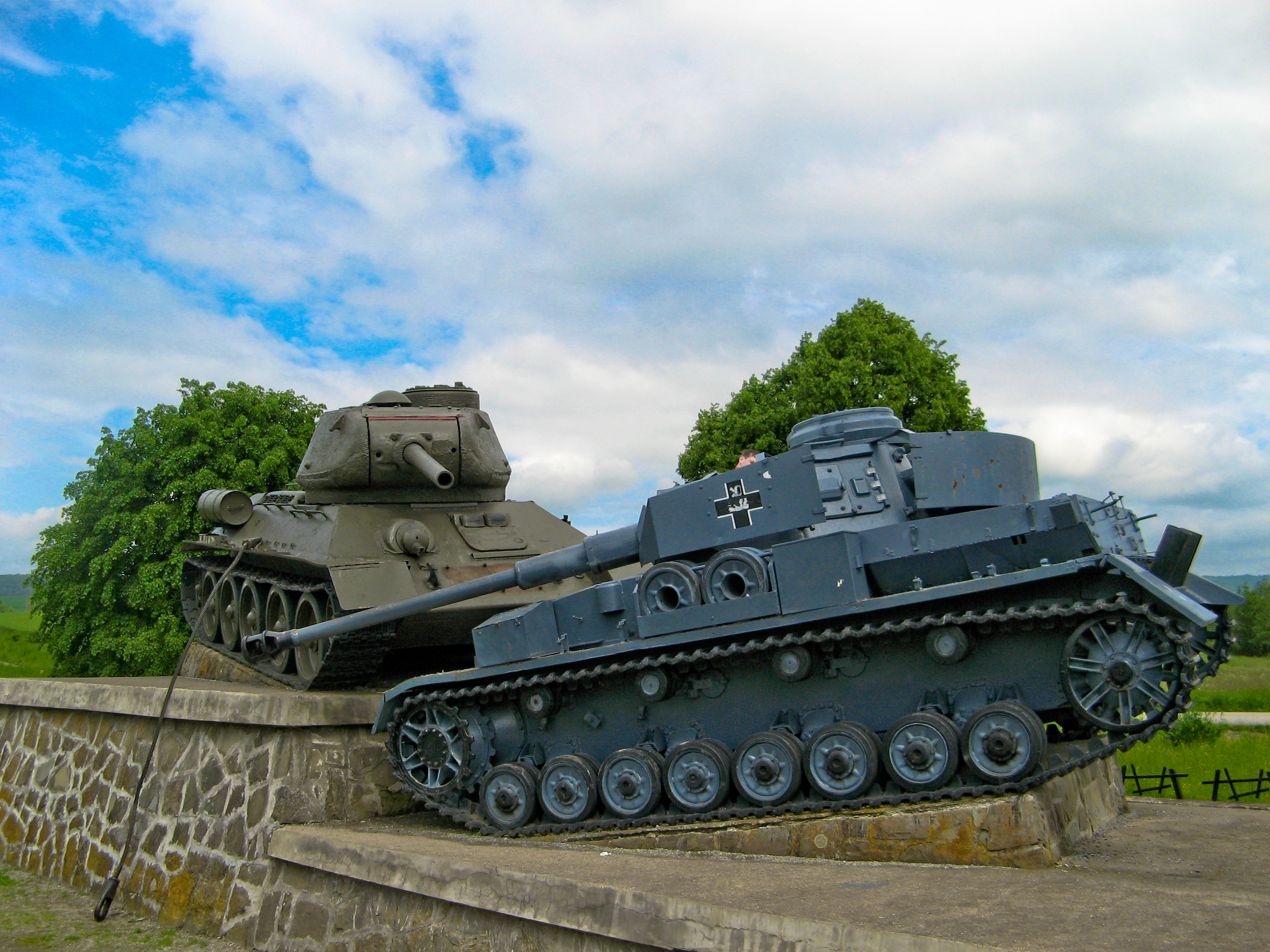
Dukla Pass memorial.

The Dukla Pass (Slovak: Dukliansky priesmyk, Polish: Przełęcz Dukielska, Hungarian: Duklai-hágó, Czech: Dukelský průsmyk; 502 m (1,647 ft) AMSL) is a strategically significant mountain pass in the Laborec Highlands of the Outer Eastern Carpathians, on the border between Poland and Slovakia (Lemkivshchyna) and close to the western border of Ukraine.

The Dukla Pass is the lowest mountain pass in the Carpathian Mountains main range. Located south of Dukla in Poland and northeast of Prešov in Slovakia, the pass is acknowledged as an area where Eastern and Western Slavic cultures meet.

In the 17th century, it was the haunt of a bandit and folk hero, Andrij Savka. The Dukla Pass was the scene of bitterly contested battles on the eastern fronts of both World War I and World War II (Battle of the Dukla Pass).
