= Głojsce =

- Village
- Location within Poland
- Coordinates: 49°34′04″N 21°36′47″E
- Country: Poland
- Voivodeship: Podkarpackie
- County: Krosno
- Gmina: Dukla

Głojsce [ˈɡwɔi̯st͡sɛ] is a village in the administrative district of Gmina Dukla, within Krosno County, Podkarpackie Voivodeship, in south-eastern Poland, close to the border with Slovakia.
