= Kapišová =

- Municipality
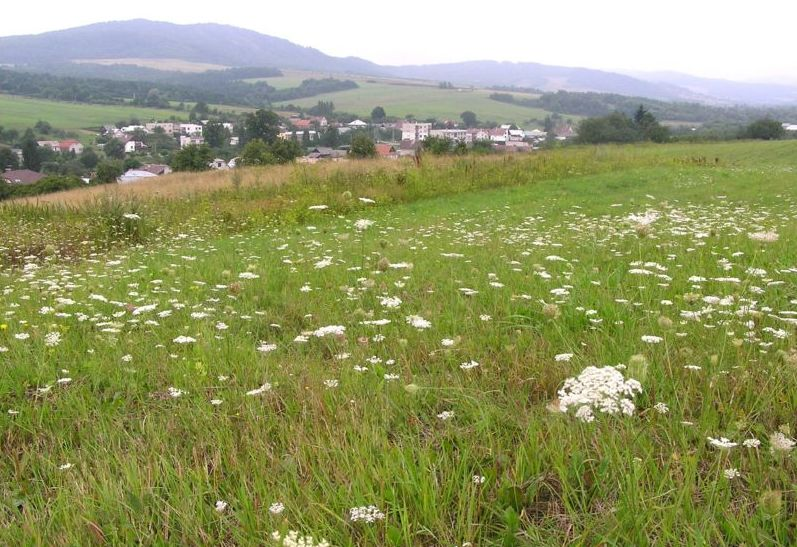

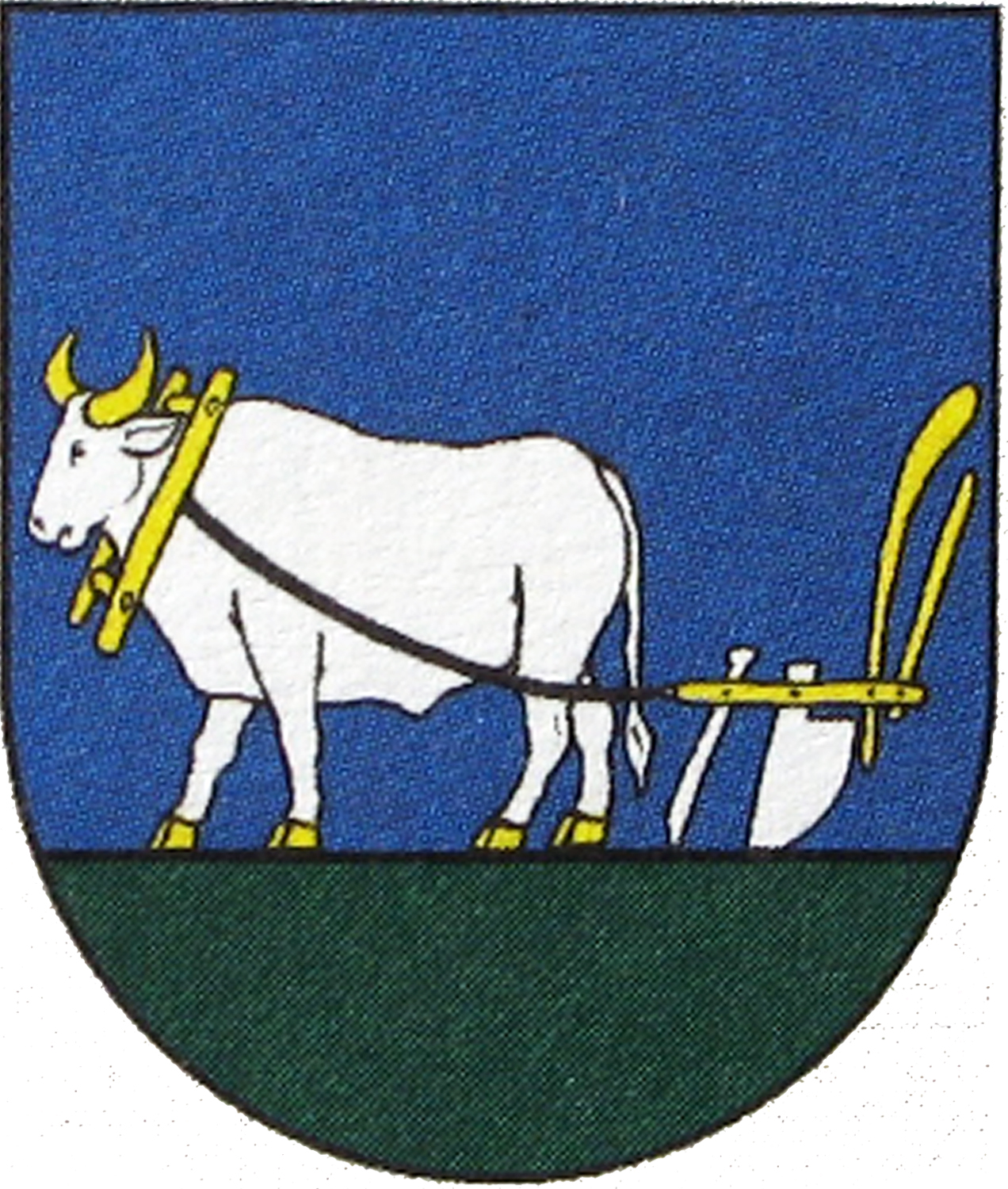
- Flag Coat of arms

- Location of Kapišová in the Prešov Region Location of Kapišová in Slovakia
- Coordinates: 49.33°N 21.60°E
- Country: Slovakia
- Region: Prešov Region
- District: Svidník District
- First mentioned: 1548

Area
  - Total: 6.61 km^{2} (2.55 sq mi)
- Elevation: 259 m (850 ft)

Population (2025)
  - Total: 456
- Time zone: UTC+1 (CET)
  - Summer (DST): UTC+2 (CEST)
- Postal code: 900 1
- Area code: +421 54
- Vehicle registration plate (until 2022): SK
- Website: www.kapisova.sk

Kapišová (Rusyn: Капішова; Hungarian: Kapisó) is a village and municipality in Svidník District in the Prešov Region of north-eastern Slovakia.

== History ==
In historical records the village was first mentioned in 1548.

== Geography ==
The municipality lies at an altitude of 259 metres (850 ft) and covers an area of 6.61 km^{2} (2.55 sq mi) (2025).

== Population ==
Population statistic (10 years)
Year	1995	2005	2015	2025
Count	343	372	423	456
Difference		+8.45%	+13.70%	+7.80%

Population statistic
Year	2024	2025
Count	457	456
Difference		−0.21%

It has a population of 456 people (31 December 2025).

=== Ethnicity ===
Census 2021 (1+ %)
Ethnicity	Number	Fraction
Slovak	399	88.66%
Rusyn	157	34.88%
Romani	119	26.44%
Not found out	14	3.11%
Total	450	

In year 2021 was 450 people by ethnicity 399 as Slovak, 157 as Rusyn, 119 as Romani, 14 as Not found out, 3 as Czech, 3 as Other, 2 as English, 1 as Ukrainian, 1 as Italian and 1 as Polish.

Note on population: The difference values of population numbers in the table "Population statistic" and in the sections "Ethnicity" & "Religion" is caused by the use of various statistical methods.

=== Religion ===
Census 2021 (1+ %)
Religion	Number	Fraction
Greek Catholic Church	358	79.56%
Eastern Orthodox Church	31	6.89%
Roman Catholic Church	26	5.78%
None	24	5.33%
Not found out	7	1.56%
Total	450	

In year 2021 was 450 people by religion 358 from Greek Catholic Church, 31 from Eastern Orthodox Church, 26 from Roman Catholic Church, 24 from None, 7 from Not found out, 1 from Calvinist Church, 1 from Paganism and natural spirituality, 1 from Evangelical Church and 1 from Ad hoc movements.

== Genealogical resources ==
The records for genealogical research are available at the state archive "Statny Archiv in Presov, Slovakia"

- Roman Catholic church records (births/marriages/deaths): 1788-1925 (parish B)

== See also ==
- List of municipalities and towns in Slovakia
