= Gmina Dukla =

Gmina Dukla Dukla Commune
- Gmina
- Coat of arms
- Interactive map of Gmina Dukla
- Coordinates (Dukla): 49°34′N 21°41′E
- Country: Poland
- Voivodeship: Subcarpathian
- County: Krosno County
- Seat: Dukla

Area
  - Total: 235.1 km^{2} (90.8 sq mi)

Population (2010)
  - Total: 14,926
  - Density: 63.49/km^{2} (164.4/sq mi)
- Website: https://www.dukla.pl/

Gmina Dukla is an urban-rural gmina (administrative district) in Krosno County, Subcarpathian Voivodeship, in south-eastern Poland, on the Slovak border. Its seat is the town of Dukla, which lies approximately 14 kilometres (9 mi) south of Krosno and 57 km (35 mi) south-west of the regional capital Rzeszów.

The gmina covers an area of 233.5 square kilometres (90.2 sq mi), and as of 2010 its total population is 14,926 (of which the population of the town of Dukla is approximately 2,000).

As of 1 January 2010, part of the gmina was separated to form the new Gmina Jaśliska.

== Villages ==
Apart from the town of Dukla, Gmina Dukla contains the villages and settlements of Barwinek, Cergowa, Chyrowa, Głojsce, Iwla, Jasionka, Łęki Dukielskie, Lipowica, Mszana, Myszkowskie, Nadole, Nowa Wieś, Olchowiec, Ropianka, Równe, Smereczne, Teodorówka, Trzciana, Tylawa, Wietrzno, Wilsznia, Zawadka Rymanowska, Zboiska, and Zyndranowa.

== Neighbouring gminas ==
Gmina Dukla is bordered by the gminas of Chorkówka, Iwonicz-Zdrój, Jaśliska, Krempna, Miejsce Piastowe, Nowy Żmigród and Rymanów. It also borders Slovakia.
