= Chyrowa =

- Village
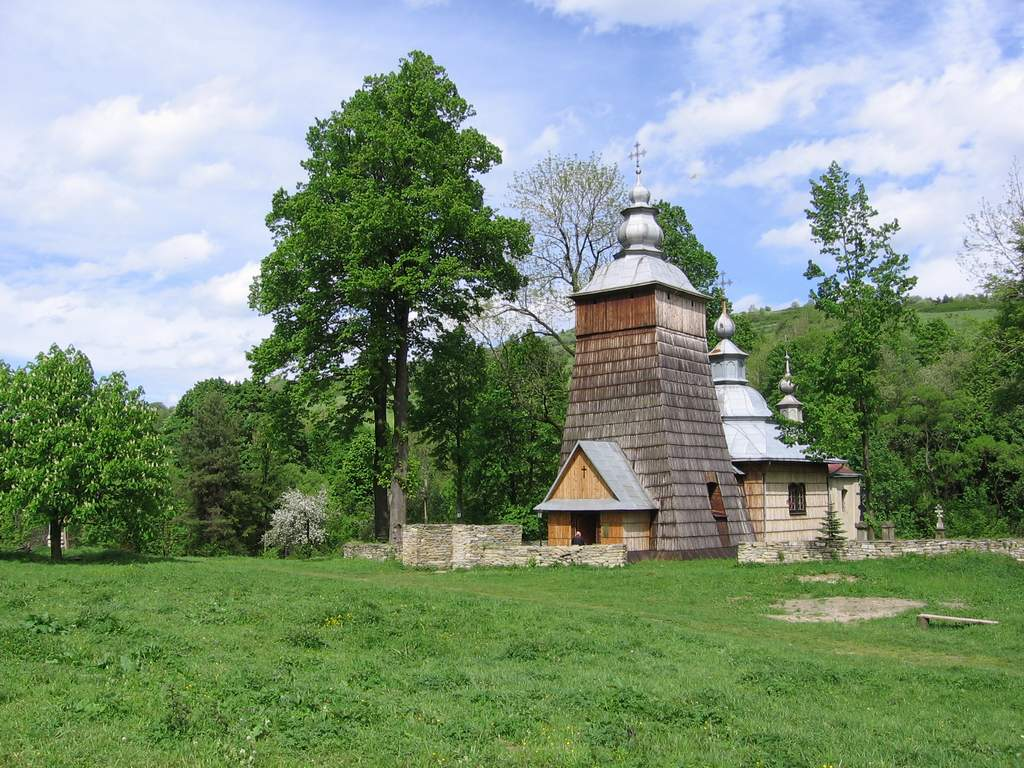
- Greek Catholic church

- Location within Poland
- Coordinates: 49°32′N 21°38′E
- Country: Poland
- Voivodeship: Subcarpathian
- County: Krosno
- Gmina: Dukla
- Population: 120

Chyrowa [xɨˈrɔva] is a village in the administrative district of Gmina Dukla, within Krosno County, Subcarpathian Voivodeship, in south-eastern Poland, close to the border with Slovakia.
