= John of Dukla =

Saint John of Dukla O.F.M. Conv.
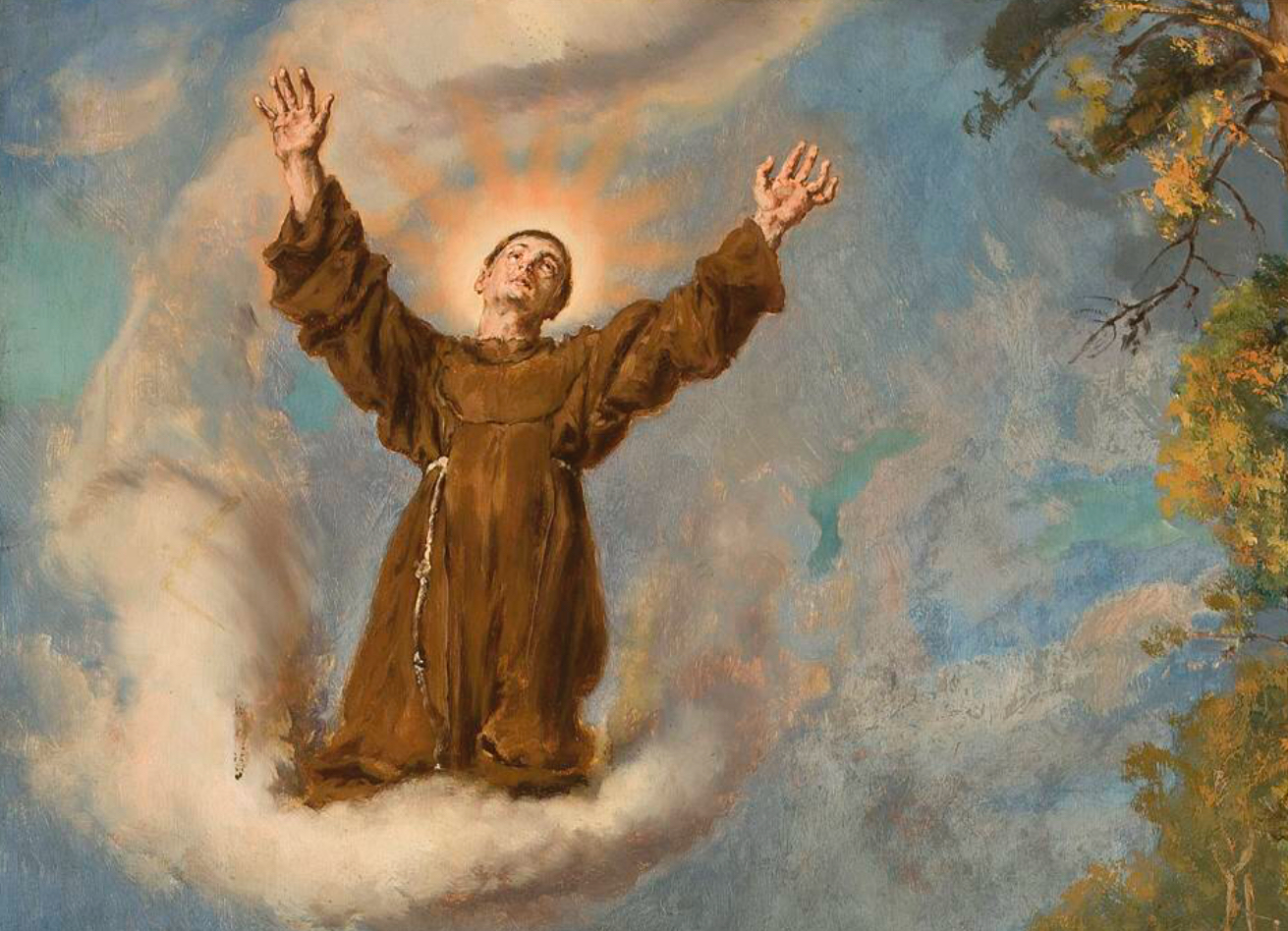
- Born: 1414; Dukla, Poland
- Died: 1484; Lwów, Poland
- Venerated in: Roman Catholic Church
- Beatified: January 23, 1733, Rome, Papal States by Pope Clement XII
- Canonized: June 10, 1997, Saint Peter's Basilica, Vatican City by Pope John Paul II
- Feast: September 28
- Patronage: Poland and Lithuania

John of Dukla (also called Jan of Dukla) is a saint in the Roman Catholic Church. He is one of the patron saints of Poland and Lithuania.

== Biography ==
John was born in Dukla, Poland, in 1414. He joined the Friars Minor Conventual, and studied in Kraków. After being ordained, he preached in Lwów (then part of Poland) and in what are now Moldavia and Belarus and was the superior of Lwów. He may have joined the Observants while efforts were being made to unite the two branches of the Franciscans.

Though he went blind at the age of 70, he prepared sermons with the help of an aide. His preaching was credited with bringing people back to the church in his province.

He died in 1484 in Lwów, Poland. Soon after his death, there was an immediate veneration at his tomb, and several miracles were attributed to him.

John was declared venerable by Pope Clement XII on 21 January 1733. The cause for his beatification was opened on 22 June 1948, and the process of evaluating a miracle attributed to him began on 18 January 1951. On June 10, 1997, he was canonized by Pope John Paul II in a mass in Krosno, Poland, before approximately one million people.

== Sources ==
- Jones, Kathleen (2006). Butler's Lives of the Saints. New York: Continuum International Publishing Group. ISBN 0-86012-255-7.
