= Wietrzno, Podkarpackie Voivodeship =

Wietrzno
- Village
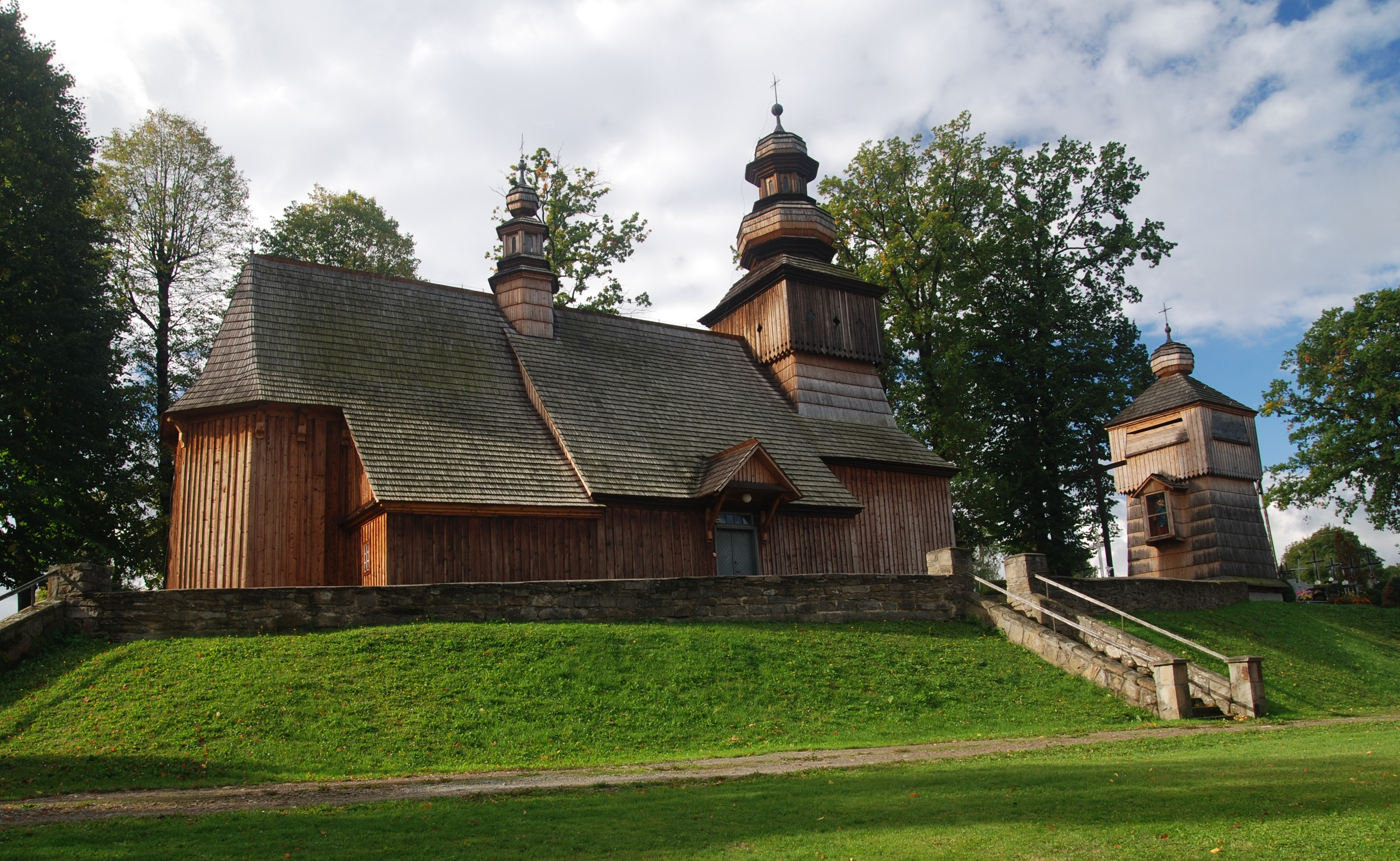
- Church of St. Michael the Archangel in Wietrzno

- Location within Poland
- Coordinates: 49°36′8″N 21°42′25″E
- Country: Poland
- Voivodeship: Subcarpathian
- County: Krosno
- Gmina: Dukla

Wietrzno [ˈvjɛtʂnɔ] is a village in the administrative district of Gmina Dukla, within Krosno County, Subcarpathian Voivodeship, in south-eastern Poland, close to the border with Slovakia.
