= Joseph Samuel Bloch =

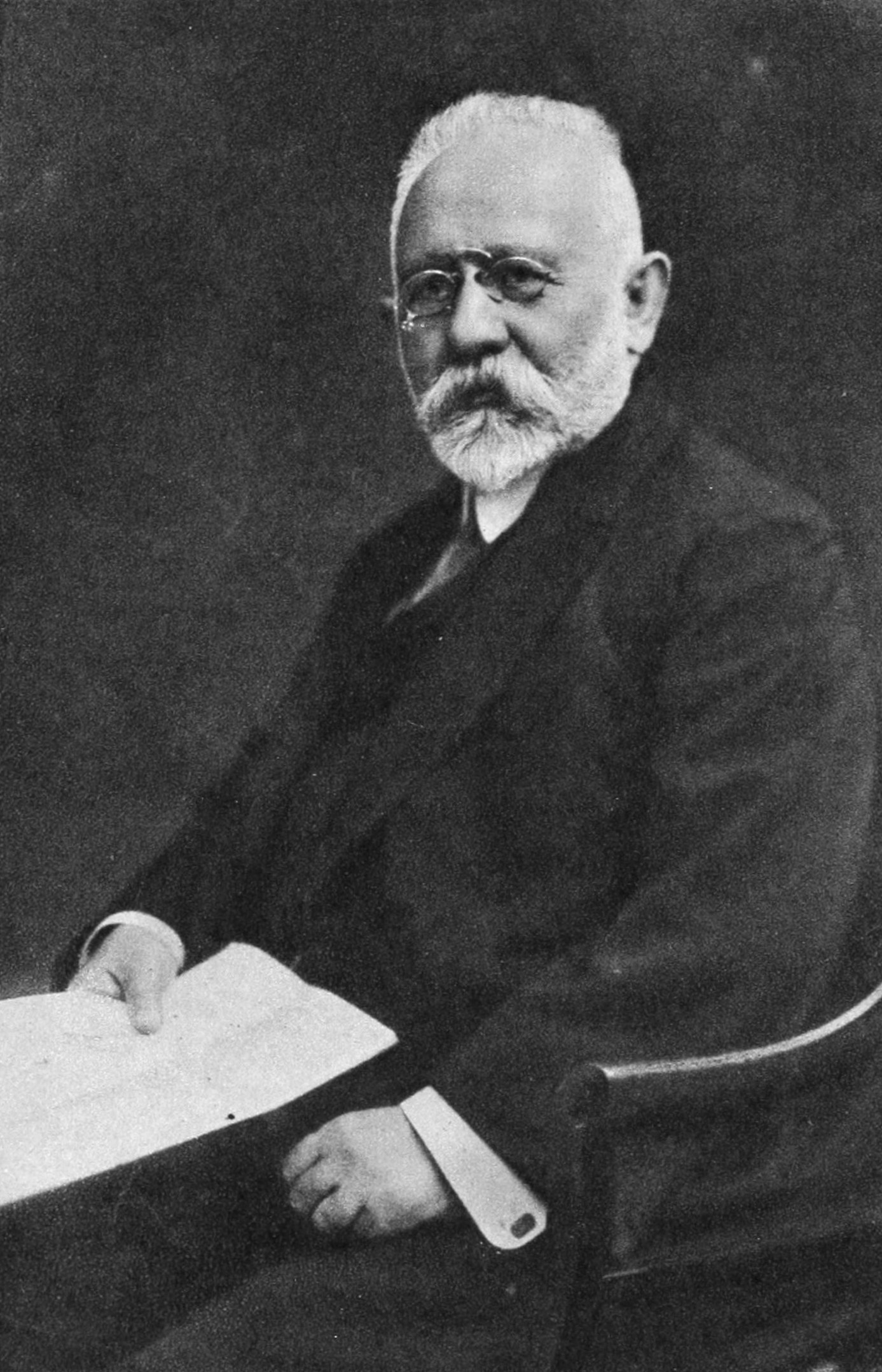
Rabbi Joseph Samuel Bloch

Joseph (Josef) Samuel Bloch (20 November 1850 in Dukla – 1923) was an Austrian rabbi and deputy of Polish descent.

== Biography ==
Bloch's parents, who were poor, destined him for the rabbinical career, and he devoted himself to the exclusive study of the Talmud. He frequented the yeshivot, especially that of Rabbi Josef Saul Nathanson at Lemberg, who, in his response, mentions Bloch, when he was only fifteen years old, as one of his most intelligent pupils. After having finished his studies at the colleges (gymnasia) of Magdeburg and Liegnitz, he went to the Ludwig-Maximilians-Universität München. Thence he went to the University of Zurich, where he obtained his degree of doctor of philosophy.

He was appointed rabbi in Rendsburg, Holstein, afterward in Kobylin, Posen (Poznań), and Brüx, Bohemia; and finally he ended his rabbinical career in Floridsdorf, near Vienna.

Antisemitism was endemic in Austria during the late 19th century and was taking political center-stage from the 1870s on. Taking advantage of this, August Rohling, a Professor of Theology at one of the German universities, published a book, Der Talmudjude (1871), which became a bestseller and was read by hundreds of thousands (one Catholic organization distributed 38,000 copies free of charge). It rehashed the worst medieval libels concerning alleged hateful and debased Talmudic teachings and Jewish religious practices. Rohling became famous, continued even more intensified attacks against the Jews, and was eventually rewarded with an appointment to the Catholic theological faculty of Prague University. During the Tisza-Eszlár trial in 1883, Rohling made a written offer to substantiate under oath the blood ritual of the Jews, namely that their religion obliged them to eat Christian flesh in their rituals. The leading rabbis of Austria issued only a brief denial of any truth to the claim and tried otherwise to ignore these outrageous falsehoods, hoping that the controversy would fade away. But Bloch, until then an obscure rabbi of a small and poor suburban congregation believed that a thorough and effective rebuttal had to be made, no matter what the ugliness of the conflict. He took on the challenge with a series of articles in which he openly accused Rohling of committing wilful perjury; Bloch also denounced Rohling, moreover, as a person utterly ignorant in Talmudic learning, not even able to translate a single page of Talmud. His articles caused a sensation; three editions of 100,000 copies sold out in a single day. As a Professor of Theology, Rohling had to respond to this very public challenge or lose all credibility and even his university position. After several successful attempts to delay the proceedings, when the trial could no longer be postponed Rohling preferred to withdraw completely, thus tacitly acknowledging defeat. He lost his professorship and became a byword amongst liberals for antisemitic falsifications, even if antisemites still honored him.

In 1884, now a hero of the Jewish community and a political figure to reckon with, Bloch founded a periodical, Oesterreichische Wochenschrift, with the aim of defending the political rights of the Jews, to refute unjust attacks, and to inspire its readers with courage and faith. Bloch also attended several meetings held by workingmen, and lectured with some success on the Talmudic principles of labor and on the laboring classes in the Old Testament.

After the death of the chief rabbi Simon Schreiber in Kraków in 1884, who had been deputy for Kolomea in parliament, Bloch was elected as his successor. In 1885, he was re-elected, and after a hard struggle with Dr. Byk in 1891, he was elected for the third time. As a member of the Chamber of Deputies, he withdrew from his rabbinical post in order to devote himself entirely to his public functions and journalism.

In 1893, instigated by Josef Deckert, a pastor in Vienna, a baptized Jew named Paulus Meyer declared in the Vaterland of May 11 that a number of Russian rabbis from Lentschna had performed a ritual murder in his presence. In the name of the children of these rabbis, Bloch at once instituted criminal proceedings against Deckert, Meyer, and the publisher of the paper, and on trial, September 15, a conspiracy was unmasked, and the three defendants were sentenced to heavy punishment.

== Works ==
When in 1896 Christian socialism had gained a strong footing in parliament, and the government had commenced to recognize the Socialist party, Bloch was sacrificed and everything imaginable was done to prevent his re-election. Through the combined efforts of the government, the Christian-Socialist party, and the Polish club (party of Polish deputies), all of whom supported the election of the Jewish burgomaster of Kolomea, Bloch was defeated in his bid for re-election.

He then devoted himself to journalism. Bloch published the following works:

- "Ursprung und Entstehung des Buches Kohelet," Bamberg, 1872
- "Studien zur Geschichte der Sammlung der Alt-Testamentlichen Litteratur," Leipsic, 1875
- "Die Juden in Spanien," Leipzig, 1876
- "Hellenistische Bestandtheile im Biblischen Kanon," 2d ed., Vienna, 1880
- "Quellen und Parallelen zu Lessing's Nathan," 2d ed., Vienna, 1881
- "Jean Bodin, ein Vorläufer Lessing's," Vienna, 1882
- "Drei Streitschriften Gegen Prof. Rohling," Vienna, 1882–83
- "Die Arbeiter bei Griechen, Römern, und Palestinensern," Vienna, 1882
- "Elementarschule, oder Erziehungswesen bei den Alten Völkern," Vienna, 1883
- "Armenpflege und Heimatsrecht, eine Social-Talmud. Studie," Vienna, 1884
- "Einblicke in die Geschichte der Entstehung der Talmudischen Literatur," Vienna, 1884
- "Aus der Vergangenheit für die Gegenwart," Vienna, 1886
- "Acten und Gutachten im Processe Rohling-Bloch," Vienna, 1892
- "Open Letter to My Esteemed Colleagues of the Italian Parliament," London, 1895 (published also in Italian and German)
- "Talmud und Judenthum in der Oesterreichischen Volksvertrebung," Vienna, 1900 (parliamentary speeches).
- "Erinnerungen aus meinem Leben", Vienna and Leipzig, 1922

== See also ==
- Ian Reifowitz, Imagining An Austrian Nation: Joseph Samuel Bloch and the Search for a Multiethnic Austrian Identity, 1846-1919 (East European Monographs; distributed by Columbia University Press, 2003).
