= Krosno County, Podkarpackie Voivodeship =

Krosno County Powiat krośnieński
- County
- Flag Coat of arms

- Location within the voivodeship
- Coordinates (Krosno): 49°41′N 21°45′E
- Country: Poland
- Voivodeship: Subcarpathian
- Seat: Krosno
- Gminas: Total 10: Gmina Chorkówka; Gmina Dukla; Gmina Iwonicz-Zdrój; Gmina Jaśliska; Gmina Jedlicze; Gmina Korczyna; Gmina Krościenko Wyżne; Gmina Miejsce Piastowe; Gmina Rymanów; Gmina Wojaszówka

Area
  - Total: 923.79 km^{2} (356.68 sq mi)

Population (2019)
  - Total: 112,301
  - Density: 121.57/km^{2} (314.85/sq mi)
  - Urban: 13,409
  - Rural: 98,892
- Car plates: RKR
- Website: www.powiat.krosno.pl

Krosno County (Polish: powiat krośnieński) is a unit of territorial administration and local government (powiat) in Subcarpathian Voivodeship, south-eastern Poland, on the Slovak border. It came into being on January 1, 1999, as a result of the Polish local government reforms passed in 1998. Its administrative seat is the city of Krosno, although the city is not part of the county (it constitutes a separate city county). The county contains four towns: Jedlicze, Rymanów, Dukla, and Iwonicz-Zdrój.

The county covers an area of 923.79 square kilometres (356.7 sq mi). As of 2019 its total population is 112,301, out of which the population of Jedlicze is 5,736, that of Rymanów is 3,825, that of Dukla is 2,061, that of Iwonicz-Zdrój is 1,787, and the rural population is 98,892.

== Neighbouring counties ==
Apart from the city of Krosno, Krosno County is bordered by Jasło County to the west, Strzyżów County to the north, and Brzozów County and Sanok County to the east. It also borders Slovakia to the south.

== Administrative divisions ==
The county is subdivided into ten gminas (four urban-rural and six rural). These are listed in the following table, in descending order of population. (There were previously only nine gminas; Gmina Jaśliska was separated from Gmina Dukla as of January 1, 2010.)

Gmina	Type	Area (km^{2})	Population (2019)	Seat
Gmina Rymanów	urban-rural	165.0	15,915	Rymanów
Gmina Jedlicze	urban-rural	58.2	15,422	Jedlicze
Gmina Dukla	urban-rural	235.1	14,610	Dukla
Gmina Miejsce Piastowe	rural	51.5	13,666	Miejsce Piastowe
Gmina Chorkówka	rural	77.8	13,458	Chorkówka
Gmina Korczyna	rural	92.1	11,192	Korczyna
Gmina Iwonicz-Zdrój	urban-rural	45.5	10,877	Iwonicz-Zdrój
Gmina Wojaszówka	rural	83.4	9,313	Wojaszówka
Gmina Krościenko Wyżne	rural	16.3	5,641	Krościenko Wyżne
Gmina Jaśliska	rural	164,5	2,207	Jaśliska

== Government ==
In the Sejm and Senate, the county is part of the Krosno constituency and Senate constituency no. 57 respectively.
