= Beskid Dukielski =

Coordinates: 49°34′00″N 21°41′00″E

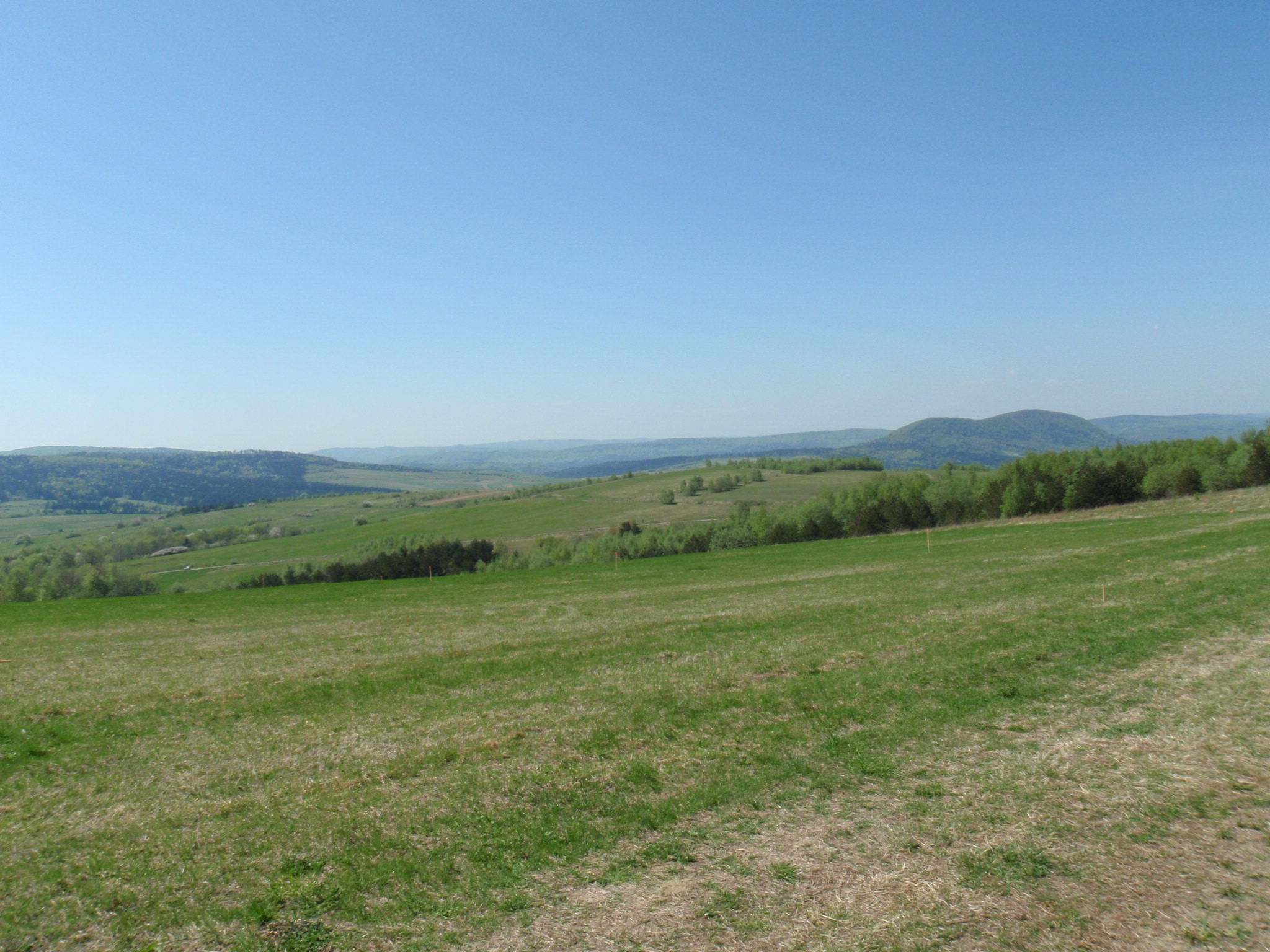
View from Przymiarki mountain on Beskid Dukielski

Beskid Dukielski (Dukla Beskid) is the middle part of the Low Beskids mountain range, lying north of the Dukla Pass and being named after the town of Dukla.

The range stretches from the valleys of the Wisłoka and Ryjak rivers in the west, to the Królik Polski - Daliowa - Czeremcha way in the east. Its boundary to the north is the Nowy Żmigród - Dukla way. Further east, the Jasionka - Lubatowa and Królik Polski way, separates Beskid Dukielski from the Rymanowski Hills.

They are composed of sedimentary rocks - mainly sandstone, shales and conglomerates. Landslides are very common.

The highest peak is Baranie ("Ram's") (754 m).

Mountains of the Beskid Dukielski include (all measurements in metres above sea level):

- Cergowa (716 m)
- Kilanowska Góra (558 m)
- Chyrowa (695 m)
- Dania (696 m)
- Polana (651 m)
- Łysa Góra (641 m)
- Grzywacka Góra (567)
- Piotruś (728 m)
- Popowa Polana (638 m)
- Ostra (687 m)
- Baranie (754 m)
- Nad Tysowym (711 m)
- Żydowska Góra (719 m)
- Zimny Wierch (702 m)
- Czerteż (648 m)
- Dziurcz (586 m)

== Bibliography ==
- Beskid Dukielski wyd. Rewasz, Pruszków 1999 ISBN 83-85557-62-8 (in Polish)
- Wojciech Krukar Rymanów Zdrój, Iwonicz-Zdrój i okolice. Mapa turystyczno-nazewnicza. wyd. Ruthenus, Krosno ISBN 83-86588-41-1 (in Polish)
