= Zyndram of Maszkowice =

Polish knight

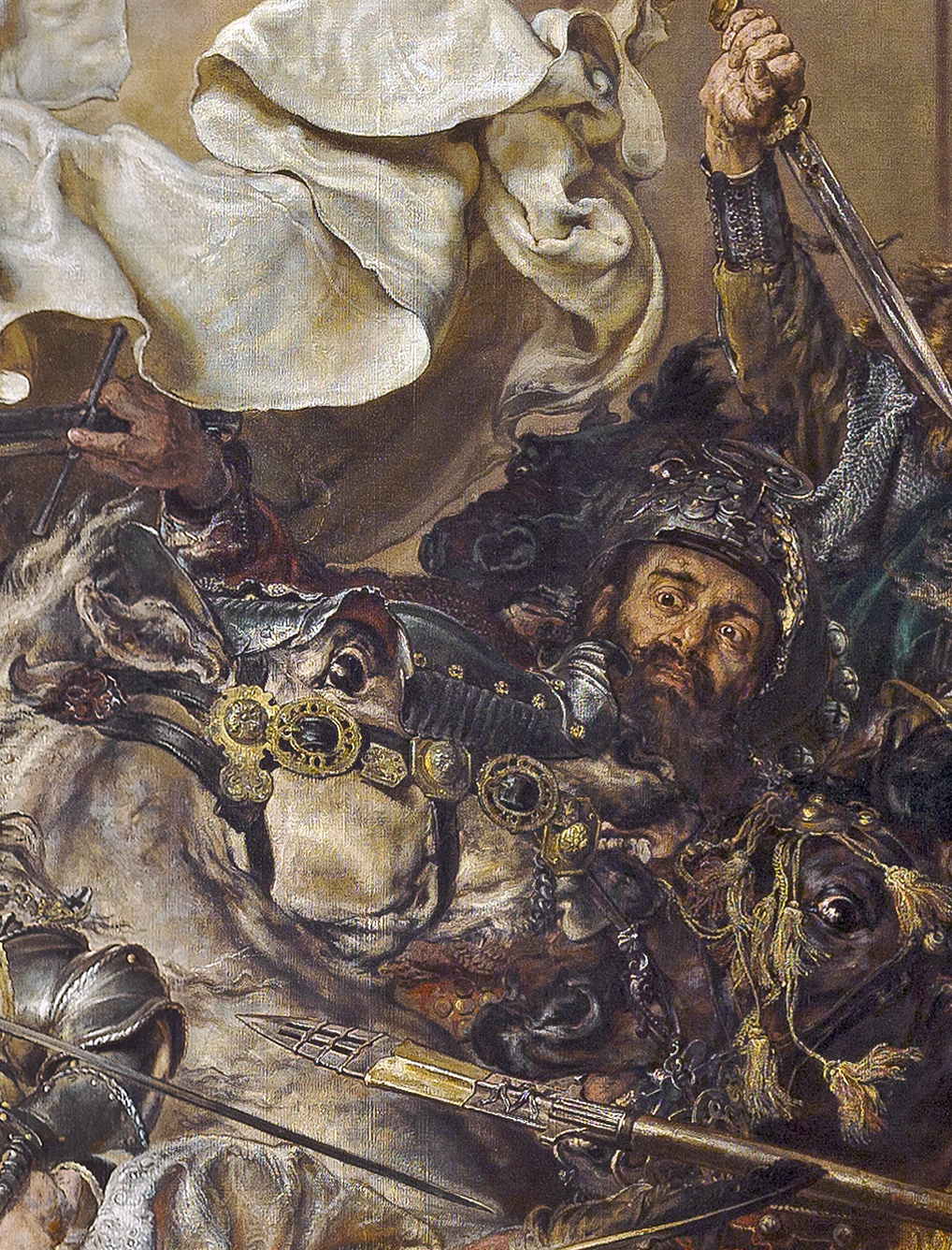
- in a detail of Battle of Grunwald by Jan Matejko
- Born: c. 1355 probably Nowy Sącz, Poland
- Died: c.1414 probably Jasło, Poland
- Known for: Commander of the Polish left wing at the Battle of Grunwald (1410); leader of the Kraków Banner (chorągiew krakowska ziemska); Sword-Bearer of the Crown (gladifer regis); and royal tenutary entrusted with the governance of Jasło, Małogoszcz, and Golesz.

Słońce coat of arms of Zyndram z Maszkowic

Zyndram of Maszkowice (Zyndram z Maszkowic, c. 1355 – c. 1414) was a Polish knight, nobleman, and military commander of the late 14th and early 15th centuries. Serving as Sword-bearer of Kraków (miecznik krakowski) under King Władysław II Jagiełło, he rose to prominence during the Polish–Lithuanian–Teutonic War, most notably as the commander of the left wing of the Polish-Lithuanian army and leader of the prestigious Kraków Banner at the Battle of Grunwald in 1410. A member of the Słońce coat of arms family, Zyndram likely descended from a sołtys (village headman) lineage based in Maszkowice, Lesser Poland.

== Origins and Family ==
Zyndram of Maszkowice hailed from a family associated with the Sun (Słońce) coat of arms, as noted by the chronicler Jan Długosz. This distinguishes him from earlier assumptions, such as those by Bartosz Paprocki, who mistakenly linked him to the Jastrzębiec clan. The Sun emblem was relatively rare in medieval Poland but appeared in regions like Podolia and in Western European heraldry, particularly in Germany, where the name Zyndram (derived from forms like Sintram or Sindram) was also occasionally used. However, no definitive connection has been established between Zyndram and these regions or families.

Zyndram’s origins are tied to Maszkowice, a village in the Nowy Sącz county, within the Łącko parish. Local tradition and contemporary sources identify him as a Kraków landowner. Maszkowice, part of the endowment of the Poor Clares’ monastery in Stary Sącz since 1280, remained under monastic control until the Josephine reforms. Notably, Zyndram is the only recorded hereditary owner of Maszkowice, and Długosz’s Liber Beneficiorum mentions a praedium (estate) in the village without specifying its owner, suggesting it may have been absorbed by the monastery by the mid-15th century.

Local tradition points to a hill above Maszkowice, known as “Zyndram’s Hill,” as the site of his fortified residence. This hill, overlooking the Dunajec River, bears traces of a medieval stronghold, with scattered stones and rubble indicating a former castle. The site’s strategic position suggests it protected the trade route along the Dunajec, connecting Hungary to Poland. Similar fortified sites existed in nearby villages like Wietrznica, Zabrzeż, and Czarny Potok, often linked to the Poor Clares’ monastery and managed by burghers or stewards rather than knightly families.

== Early life and ancestry ==
The origins of Zyndram’s family remain uncertain. His rare given name—uncommon in Poland but attested in German-speaking regions—suggests possible Western European influence. In Poland, the name appears in Nowy Sącz records, where a 1329 document lists a Mikołaj, son of Zyndram, among the burghers involved in a trade agreement with Kraków. This earlier Zyndram, likely active in the late 13th century, may have been an ancestor of Zyndram of Maszkowice, possibly even one of the town’s founding settlers. The hereditary use of the uncommon name across generations strengthens this hypothesis.

Further evidence suggests a Silesian lineage. A family bearing the name Zyndram is documented in Bielawa in Silesia during the late 13th and early 14th centuries. Zyndram I, a hereditary village head (sołtys) of Bielawa, had three sons: Piotr, Zyndram II, and Henryk. Piotr and Zyndram II were active around 1300, while Henryk died in 1329. Zyndram II’s son, Zyndram III, and Henryk’s son, Zyndram IV—known as “the Wise”—are both mentioned in records from 1329, when they, along with their uncle Piotr, testified about a rent obligation to the hospital in Zgorzelec. Earlier, in 1322, Piotr and Zyndram II had served as witnesses to a document issued by Herman of Reichenbach (ibid., no. 4198). These records place Zyndram I’s activity in the second half of the 13th century, and those of his sons and grandsons in the early 14th.

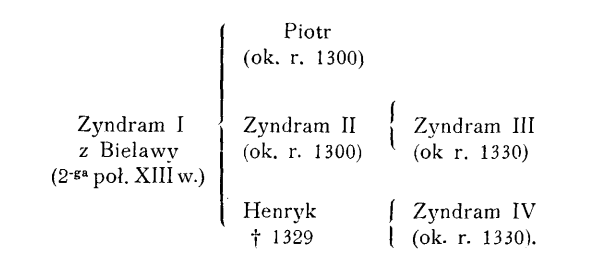
Genealogical chart of the Zyndram family of Bielawa, Lower Silesia, as reconstructed by Władysław Semkowicz (1910). It shows multiple generations of the family from the late 13th to mid-14th century.

The connection between the Silesian Zyndrams and the Zyndram-named burghers of Nowy Sącz is reinforced by ties to the Dives (Bogacz) family, who were also of Silesian origin. In a 1321 document from the Henryków monastery, Jan Dives appears alongside Piotr of Bielawa—one of the known Silesian Zyndrams. Jan’s sons, Hanko and Peterman, later appear in a 1329 trade agreement alongside Mikołaj, son of a Zyndram, in Nowy Sącz. Still later, in 1362, Peszko Dives is recorded as a town juror in Tarnów, serving with a man named Zyndram—evidence of an enduring association across towns and generations. These recurring connections suggest that the Zyndrams of Nowy Sącz, including the likely ancestor of Zyndram of Maszkowice, may have descended from Silesian burghers or village officials who migrated into southern Poland—possibly encouraged by figures like Spicymir Leliwita, the founder of Tarnów and an influential link between Silesia and Lesser Poland.

Zyndram of Maszkowice’s rise from burgher or steward origins to the ranks of the nobility was far from uncommon in 14th-century Poland. Notable parallels include the Brzezin family, later known by the Trąby coat of arms, which descended from stewards in Myślenice, and the Bielin (Koniowaszyja) family, whose roots lay among Silesian townsmen. Silesia, in particular, was a major source of knightly families entering the Polish noble class—especially under King Casimir the Great, whose policies actively encouraged the settlement and integration of Silesian elites. In this broader context, Zyndram’s noble status appears not as an exception, but as part of a larger pattern of upward social mobility in late medieval Poland.

== Career and Land Holdings ==
The earliest known reference to Zyndram of Maszkowice appears in a court record dated 2 June 1388, preserved in the books of the Biecz land court (iudicium supremum Biecense). In this record, a man named Piotr—a sołtys (village headman) and son-in-law of the wójt of Jasło, Bertram—entrusted Zyndram with legal representation "ad lucrandum et perdendum" (to win or lose the case on his behalf). From that point forward, Zyndram’s name occurs frequently in the court records for nearly twenty-five years.

These early legal and administrative ties with the Biecz court and Jasło officials suggest that Zyndram held property in the region. This is supported by a document issued by Zyndram on 4 October 1389 in Jasło, known through a royal confirmation from 1428. In the charter, Zyndram granted land along both banks of the Morwa (Murmawa) River between Jasło and Deszno to a man named Hanzl (also called Jon) for the foundation of a village under German law, to be called Johane. The document identifies Jaśliska as Zyndram’s residence.

Although Jaśliska and its surroundings lay along the eastern border of the Biecz region, on the right bank of the Jasiołka River within the Sanok district, the estates may have extended into the Biecz territory on the opposite bank. Just south of Jaśliska, across the Jasiołka River, lies the village of Zyndranowa—whose name is believed to derive from Zyndram himself. The site is thought to have housed his manor or fortified residence.

In addition to Jaśliska and Zyndranowa, Zyndram owned several other villages: Lubatowa (sold to the Bishopric of Przemyśl in 1408), Jasionka (subject of a legal dispute with Bishop Maciej of Przemyśl in 1412), and Królików (also known as Królik). These holdings were eventually acquired by the bishopric. According to a royal grant issued in 1426 by King Władysław Jagiełło, the estates of Jaśliska and Królików reverted to the Crown upon Zyndram’s death and were subsequently granted to the royal gunner Andrzej. The document states that Zyndram had received the estates ex donatione regia ("by royal grant").

The exact timing of the grant is uncertain, though it likely occurred between 1386 (the beginning of Jagiełło’s reign) and 1388 (when Zyndram’s court activity begins). It is also possible that Zyndram initially held royal lands under lease before acquiring full ownership. The first direct source indicating ownership appears in 1401, when Zyndram pledged 60 grzywnas to Gniewosz of Dalewice secured on the village of Lubatowa.

In addition to his hereditary estate in Maszkowice and the granted lands around Jaśliska, Zyndram held royal tenancies (tenutae), including the estates of Małogoszcz and Jasło. Although Małogoszcz is only mentioned once (in 1401), Zyndram appears repeatedly between 1405 and 1412 as heres de Jassel and capitaneus Jasslensis, suggesting he held an official position in Jasło as early as 1388. Around 1408, he is also recorded as capitaneus Golesensis, referring to his lease of the nearby Golesz estate, owned by the Benedictine Abbey in Tyniec.

These holdings and administrative posts positioned Zyndram as a significant landholder and local official in southeastern Lesser Poland. His consolidation of property in the Jaśliska region reflects a notable rise in status from his roots in Maszkowice, where his family had served as hereditary sołtysi under the Poor Clares of Nowy Sącz.

== Military career ==
Zyndram’s military experience began to emerge in the late 14th century. In 1390, during a campaign against Vytautas’s alliance with the Teutonic Knights, he was entrusted by King Jagiełło with guarding Kamieniec Litewski, a strategic fortress on the Lśną River, after its capture. This role, following the conquest of Brest Litovsk and Kamieniec, highlights his early recognition as a capable commander. His involvement likely continued after the 1392 reconciliation at Ostrow, as Jagiełło sent seasoned knights to support Vytautas against the Knights in 1393 and 1394. Court records from this period describe Zyndram as being in arduis negotiis, in necessitate domini regis, in servitio regali—"engaged in difficult affairs, in the king’s need, in royal service"—with King Jagiełło himself requesting court delays on his behalf, suggesting that Zyndram was away on campaign. The 1394 royal accounts record a payment of 10 grzywnas to Zyndram for two lances for an expedition “when it pleases the king,” indicating service likely on the Lithuanian front. This experience may have earned him lands, possibly Jaśliska, as referenced in a Biecz court case.

From 1395 to 1400, Zyndram disappears from records, suggesting he may have been abroad. Some historians speculate he participated in the 1396 Battle of Nicopolis against the Ottomans, where Polish knights were present, citing parallels between Grunwald’s strategy—advancing as a unified front rather than fragmented units—and the lessons from Nicopolis, where the French erred. Though Długosz does not name Zyndram at Nicopolis, his absence from Polish records and the tactical sophistication at Grunwald support this hypothesis.

== Role in the Battle of Grunwald ==
Zyndram of Maszkowice was a notable figure in the Battle of Grunwald on 15 July 1410, leading the left wing of the Polish-Lithuanian army during this decisive engagement in the Polish–Lithuanian–Teutonic War, which resulted in a victory over the Teutonic Knights. His appointment as a military commander is documented by Jan Długosz in his Historia Polonica, noting his oversight of the Polish forces, including the prestigious Kraków Banner, the army’s largest and most skilled unit.

On 9 July 1410, as the Polish-Lithuanian army advanced into a plain and unfurled their standards—including the royal white eagle banner—King Władysław II Jagiełło led tearful prayers with the Grand Duke, Mazovian princes, and the army singing “Bogu Rodzica,” invoking God’s witness against the enemy’s provocation. With no hired Czech or Moravian experts willing to assume command due to fear of blame in case of an unfavorable war, Zyndram of Maszkowice, Sword-bearer of Kraków, a nobleman of the Sun coat of arms, was entrusted with leadership, described by Długosz as of small stature but with great courage and resourcefulness. That day, amid reports of Lithuanian and Tatar looting, including a church desecration, Vytautas ordered the execution of two offenders to restore discipline. On 15 July, Zyndram directed the royal Polish forces, positioning 50 banners on the left wing, including the Kraków Banner he led, while Vytautas commanded 40 Lithuanian banners on the right. Długosz’s account focuses on this pre-battle deployment, with no further mention of Zyndram during combat.

The extent of Zyndram’s authority is unclear in Długosz’s narrative, particularly his relationship with a military council formed on 10 July under Vytautas, which likely included him despite his absence from the listed eight members. This council managed marches, camps, and supplies, and reportedly decided Jagiełło should remain in camp for safety. Zyndram’s role, described with terms like cura et ordinatio, ductio, and regimen, involved tactical deployment, as seen in organizing battle lines during Jagiełło’s prayers. Semkowicz proposes Zyndram acted as an autonomous commander in the king’s stead, a view supported by Jagiełło’s limited role—praying and observing from a hill while resisting Vytautas’s pleas to engage. Długosz’s princeps militiae (a term from Gallus and Kadłubek) indicates a temporary commander, also held by Piotr of Szamotuły (1438, 1461) and Jan Zaręba (1461). Kutrzeba argues Zyndram was not a hetman due to royal dependence, but Semkowicz suggests autonomy, inferring Zyndram issued orders and led the Kraków Banner. Post-Grunwald delegations, such as Piotr Szafraniec in November 1410 and Sędziwój of Ostroróg in December 1410, support the hetman or capitaneus title, though Zyndram’s command ended with the victory.

Zyndram’s contribution is suggested by the Kraków Banner’s loss and restoration of its standard, aiding the Polish success. Semkowicz attributes the army’s formation—integrating territorial and familial levies—to Zyndram, inferring he supported weak points, though Długosz’s silence on combat leaves this undocumented. Semkowicz attributes this to possible bias in Długosz’s episodic, tendency-driven account, favoring nobles like the Oleśnicki family over Zyndram’s sołtys origins. Zyndram’s experience included guarding Kamieniec Litewski in 1390, serving in 1393–1394 expeditions against the Teutonic Order (supported by judicial records and a 1394 payment of 10 grzywna for lances), and a likely 1395–1400 absence, possibly at the 1396 Battle of Nicopolis. Semkowicz proposes this experience, including a potential Nicopolis influence on a unified front tactic, offered tactical insight, though this is hypothetical.

Zyndram’s selection over prominent nobles, despite his modest sołtys family background, reflected his recognized talent. Długosz notes Czech and Moravian experts’ refusal due to fear of failure led to his appointment, a choice Semkowicz links to his energy, bravery, and foresight, qualities he compares to Władysław Łokietek, victor of Płowce.

=== Cultural Depictions ===
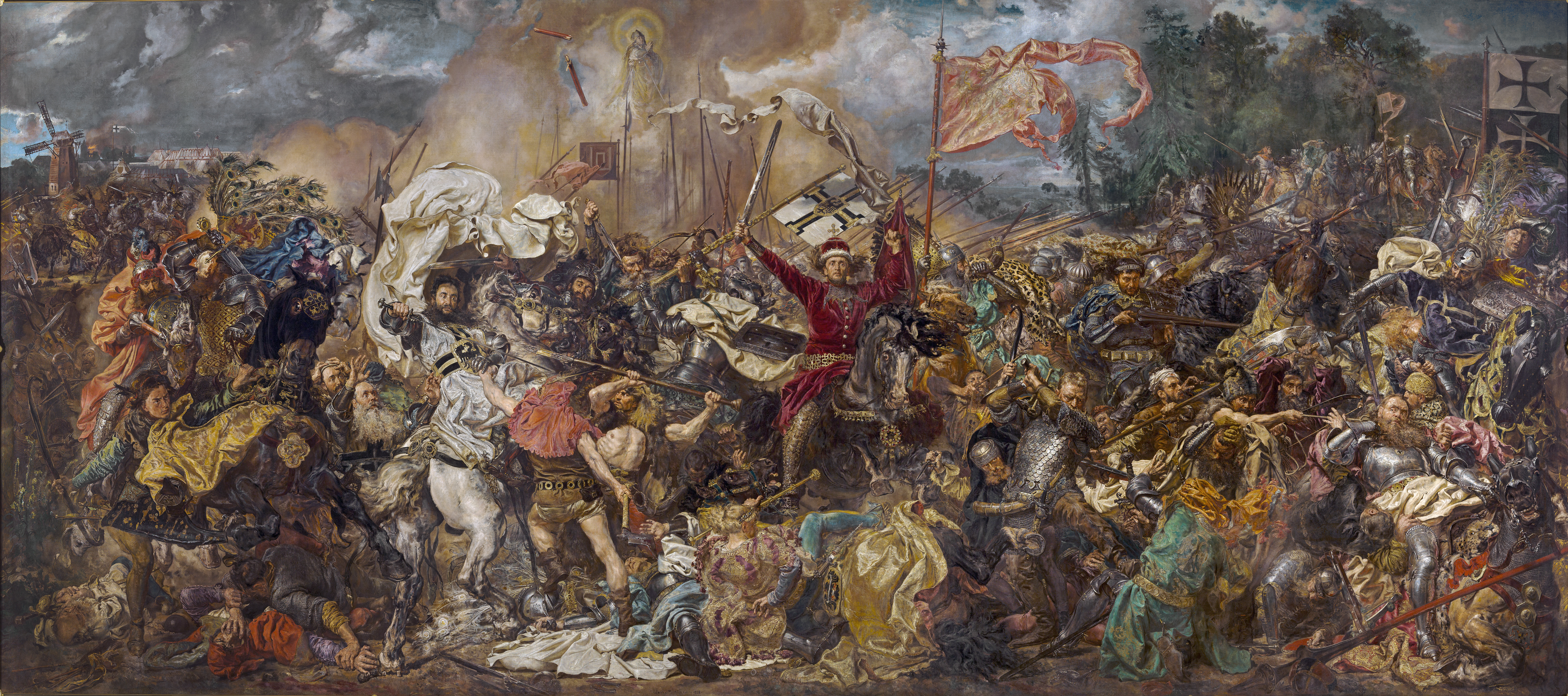
The Battle of Grunwald is a painting by Jan Matejko in 1878 depicting the Battle of Grunwald and the victory of the allied Crown of the Kingdom of Poland and Grand Duchy of Lithuania over the Teutonic Order in 1410. Zyndram of Maszkowice is depicted holding a sword over the head of Grand Master of the Teutonic Order, Ulrich von Jungingen.

Jan Matejko’s 1878 painting Battle of Grunwald depicts Zyndram holding a sword over the head of the Teutonic commander, Ulrich von Jungingen, suggesting his direct role in the Grand Master’s demise. His part in the battle was also described by Henryk Sienkiewicz in his novel The Teutonic Knights.

== Death and legacy ==
Following the Battle of Grunwald in 1410, Zyndram of Maszkowice withdrew from public life. No records indicate his involvement in post-Grunwald operations, and unlike many commanders, he received no documented rewards, such as promotions or significant land grants. The reasons for this remain unclear, though some historians suggest possible court intrigue or perceptions of his non-elite status may have played a role. Despite his pivotal role in one of Poland’s greatest military victories, he returned to private life.

By 1411, Zyndram appeared frequently in Biecz court records, grappling with financial difficulties. Prior to the war, he had sold his estate of Lubatowa in the Jaśliska region to Bishop Maciej of Przemyśl for 300 grzywnas of silver, retaining a three-year repurchase option, likely anticipating wartime gains. The campaign, however, brought no profit, and in 1411, he was forced to take out a loan of 76 grzywnas from a local nobleman. Around the same time, he sued Bishop Maciej over 700 grzywnas tied to a land dispute involving the nearby village of Jasionka. Zyndram presented a ruling in his favor, but a royal commission, including high-ranking officials such as Archbishop Mikołaj Trąba, dismissed his claim, deeming his submitted document invalid.

The commission’s ruling on October 18, 1412, marks the last confirmed mention of Zyndram of Maszkowice. The exact date of his death remains unknown; however, by June 5, 1414, his wife, Anna, was recorded as the “Widow of Zyndram.” Anna, likely a burgher from Kraków, first appeared alongside Zyndram in the Biecz court records in 1393 and outlived him by at least a decade. She remained active in legal proceedings, litigating as the widow of Zyndram in the Sanok court, as late as 1425.

Zyndram left no male heir. He had a daughter, whose name is not recorded, who married Jan, a Kraków burgher and city councilor, active between 1422 and 1456. Jan adopted the surname “Zyndram” from his father-in-law. After Zyndram’s death, his estates reverted to the Crown under the right of escheat. The Maszkowice estate, including his fortified residence, now known as Zyndram’s Hill, was transferred to the Poor Clares convent in Stary Sącz.

== See also ==
- Offices in Polish-Lithuanian Commonwealth
- Zyndram's Hill
- Battle of Grunwald
