= Czeremcha =

Czeremcha may refer to places in Poland:

- Czeremcha, Podkarpackie Voivodeship
- Czeremcha, Podlaskie Voivodeship
