= Szklary =

Szklary may refer to the following places in Poland:

- Szklary, Kłodzko County in Lower Silesian Voivodeship (south-west Poland)
- Szklary, Ząbkowice County in Lower Silesian Voivodeship (south-west Poland)
- Szklary, Lesser Poland Voivodeship (south Poland)
- Szklary, Gmina Jaśliska, Krosno County in Subcarpathian Voivodeship (south-east Poland)
- Szklary, Rzeszów County in Subcarpathian Voivodeship (south-east Poland)
- Szklary, Opole Voivodeship (south-west Poland)
