= Battle of Grunwald (disambiguation) =

The Battle of Grunwald was a 1410 battle between Poles, Lithuanians, and Teutonic Knights.

The Battle of Grunwald may also refer to:

- Battle of Grunwald (painting), an 1878 painting by Jan Matejko

== See also ==
- Battle of Tannenberg, a 1914 battle at the same location
- After the Battle of Grunwald, a painting in The Slav Epic
