= Lubatówka =

- Village
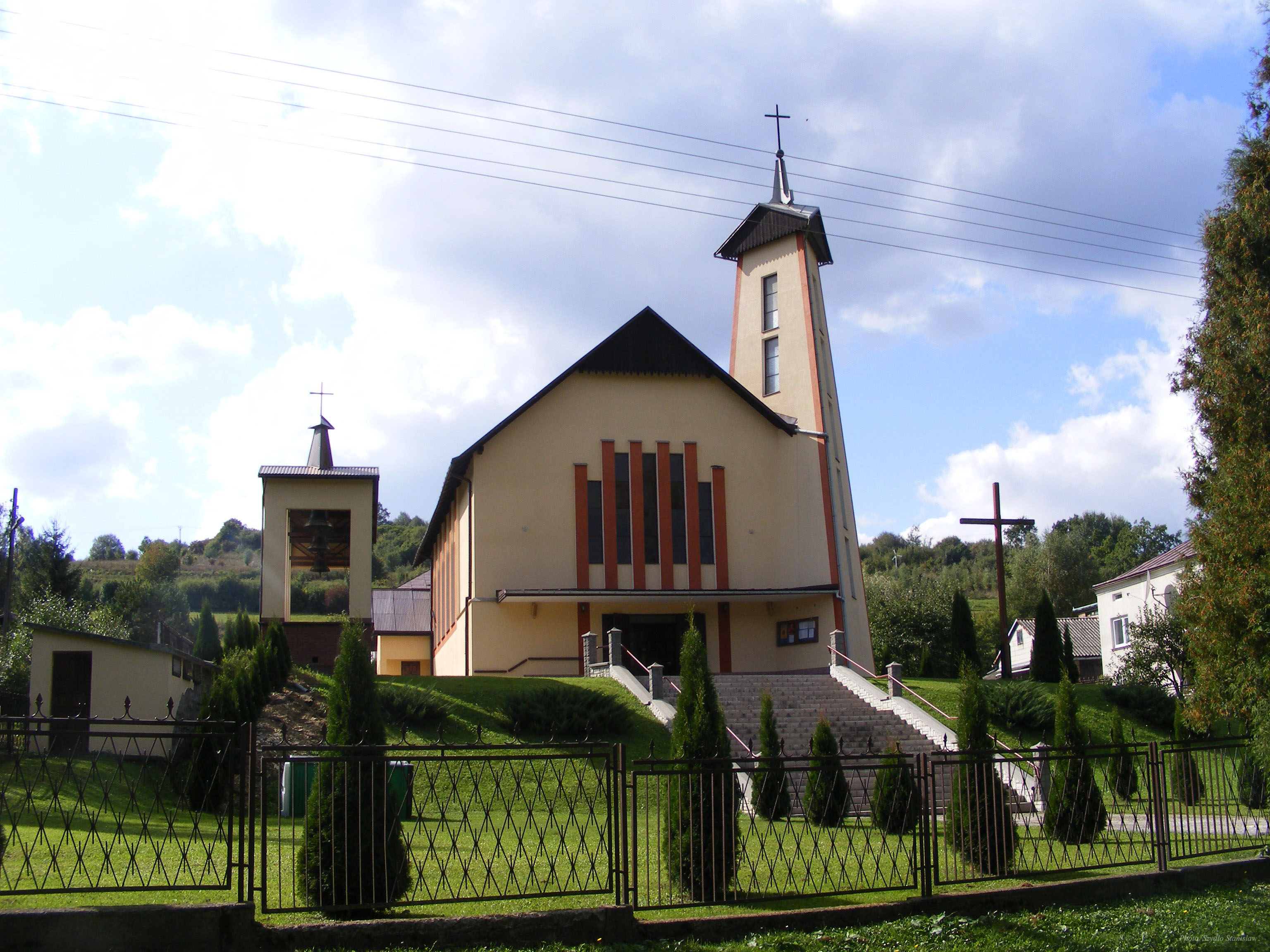
- Our Lady Church in Lubatówka

- Location within Poland
- Coordinates: 49°35′N 21°45′E
- Country: Poland
- Voivodeship: Subcarpathian
- County: Krosno
- Gmina: Iwonicz-Zdrój
- Population: 1,100

Lubatówka [lubaˈtufka], is a village in the administrative district of Gmina Iwonicz-Zdrój, within Krosno County, Subcarpathian Voivodeship, in south-eastern Poland.
