= Jaśliska =

- Village
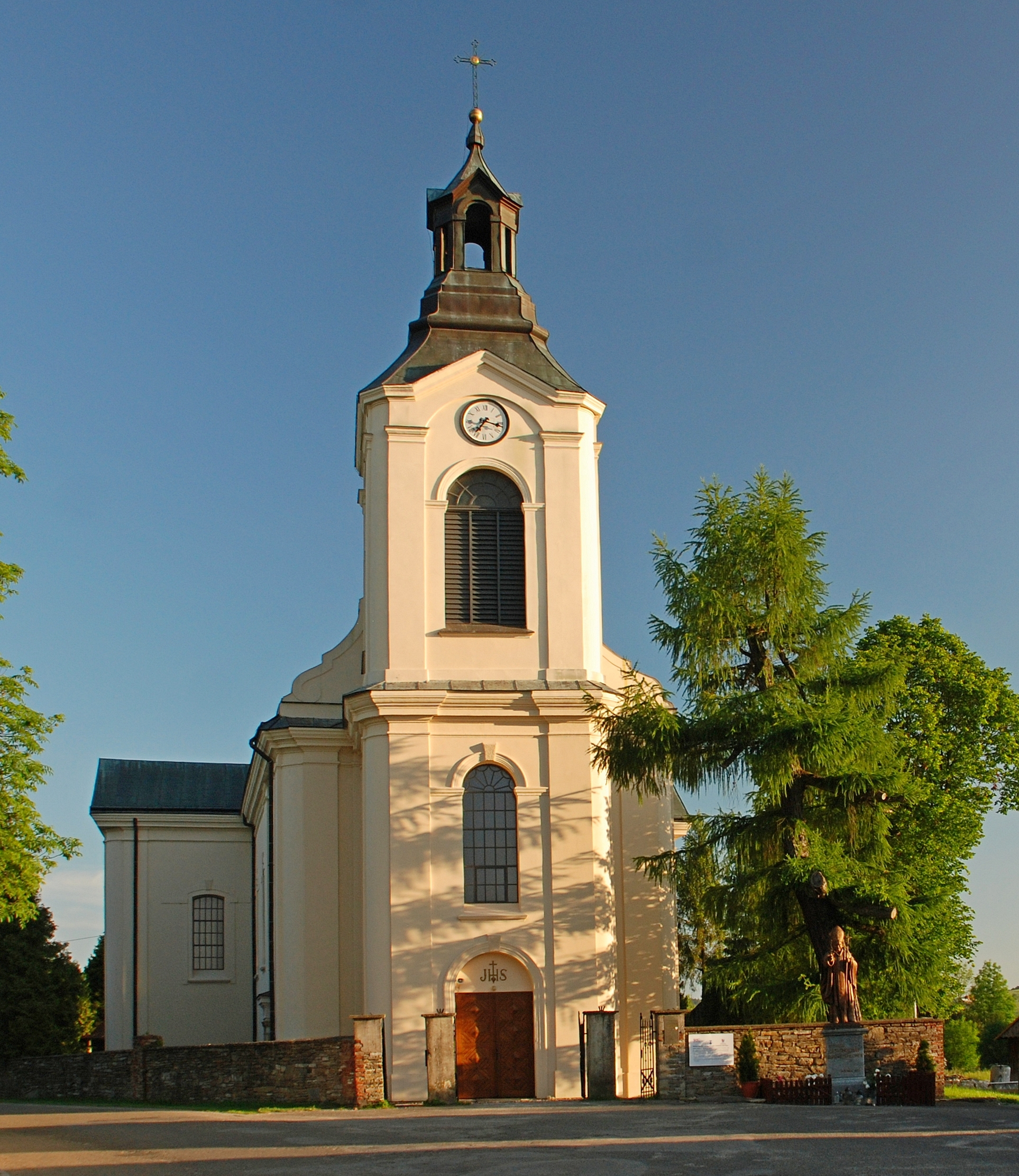
- St. Catherine of Alexandria Church

- Location within Poland
- Coordinates: 49°27′N 21°48′E
- Country: Poland
- Voivodeship: Subcarpathian
- County: Krosno
- Gmina: Jaśliska
- Population: 480

Jaśliska [jaˈɕlʲiska] is a village in Krosno County, Subcarpathian Voivodeship, in south-eastern Poland, close to the border with Slovakia.

The village gives its name to the protected area known as Jaśliska Landscape Park.

Since 1 January 2010, Jaśliska has been the seat of the gmina (administrative district) called Gmina Jaśliska, which was formerly part of Gmina Dukla. The village was previously the seat of a gmina in the periods 1934–1954 and 1973–1976.

== History ==
In the early years of Polish statehood, the area of Jasliska probably belonged to the tribe of the Vistulans, which in the late 10th century became part of Poland. For the next centuries, this hilly corner of the kingdom was sparsely inhabited and covered by dense forests. In the mid-14th century, King Kazimierz Wielki decided to found a new town, located in the Jasiolka river valley. On January 28, 1366, in Opatowiec, the King granted Magdeburg rights to a town called Hohstadt (see Walddeutsche). First owner of the town was a Hungarian nobleman, John of Hanselin.

Hohstadt, whose name was later changed into Jasliska, had a vogt, and a medieval market square with a town hall, modelled after nearby Biecz. In the late 1360s, a man named Hank Weiss was named voght of Hohstadt, and in 1386 – 1389 the town with adjacent villages became property of Zyndram of Maszkowice, after whose death Hohstadt passed into royal hands. In 1431 King Wladyslaw Jagiello handed Hohstadt to Janusz, the Bishop of Przemysl. For the next 400 years, until 1848, Jasliska and a number of local villages, inhabited mostly by Rusyns, belonged to Bishops of Przemysl.

In 1474, the area of Jasliska was destroyed in a raid of Hungarian army of Matthias Corvinus. The town was burned to the ground, so on May 1, 1506, in Lublin, King Aleksander Jagiellonczyk granted additional privileges to Jasliska, including weekly fairs on every Tuesday, and extempting its residents from taxes for the period of eight years. In 1559, Jasliska was granted the right to stock wine in cellars, but at the same time, merchants bypassed the town, due to high duties.

Jasliska prospered in the period known as Polish Golden Age, when it belonged to Biecz County of Kraków Voivodeship. The town was located along a very busy merchant route from Poland to Hungary (now territory of Slovakia). On August 18, 1578, King Stefan Batory confirmed the privileges of Jasliska, stating that all wine merchants had to take the southward route via Jasliska, Dukla, Rymanow. In 1608, Bishop of Przemysl banned all non-Catholics from settling in the town.

In early 1656, Lesser Poland was invaded by Transilvanian army of George II Rakoczi (see also Swedish invasion of Poland. The enemy tried to capture Jasliska, but the town was well defended, and the Transilvanians abandoned the siege. To commemorate this success, a monument was erected in 1659.

In 1724–32, Bishop Aleksander Antoni Fredro funded a brick church in Jasliska. The complex was remodelled in 1912. In March 1762, Pope Clement XIV issued a bill, in which Jasliska was transferred from the Diocese of Krakow to the Diocese of Przemysl. In 1772, following the first partition of Poland, Jasliska was annexed by the Habsburg Empire, and remained in Austrian Galicia until 1918. During Austrian rule, Jasliska declined and lost its significance. Finally, in 1934, the government of the Second Polish Republic stripped it of the town charter.

In 1921, there were 876 people living in Jaśliska of whom 224 were Jews. By the start of World War II this number had increased to 300. In 1941, there were 330 Jews in the town. On 13 August 1942 they were chased out of their homes into the marketplace. The elderly and children were executed by firing squad in the forest on the Błudna Mountain slope, between Barwinek and Tylawa. Men who were young and strong were driven out of the town to an unknown labor camp. In December 1943, five people were executed by firing squad in the cemetery. Only a dozen or so Jews survived the pogrom.

== Modern times ==
In 2019, the village served as a setting to an Academy Award-nominated film Corpus Christi directed by Jan Komasa.

== See also ==
- Walddeutsche
