= Jaśliska Landscape Park =

Landscape park in Poland

Coordinates: 49.4319°N 21.7528°E

- Jaśliski Park Krajobrazowy
- IUCN category V (protected landscape/seascape)
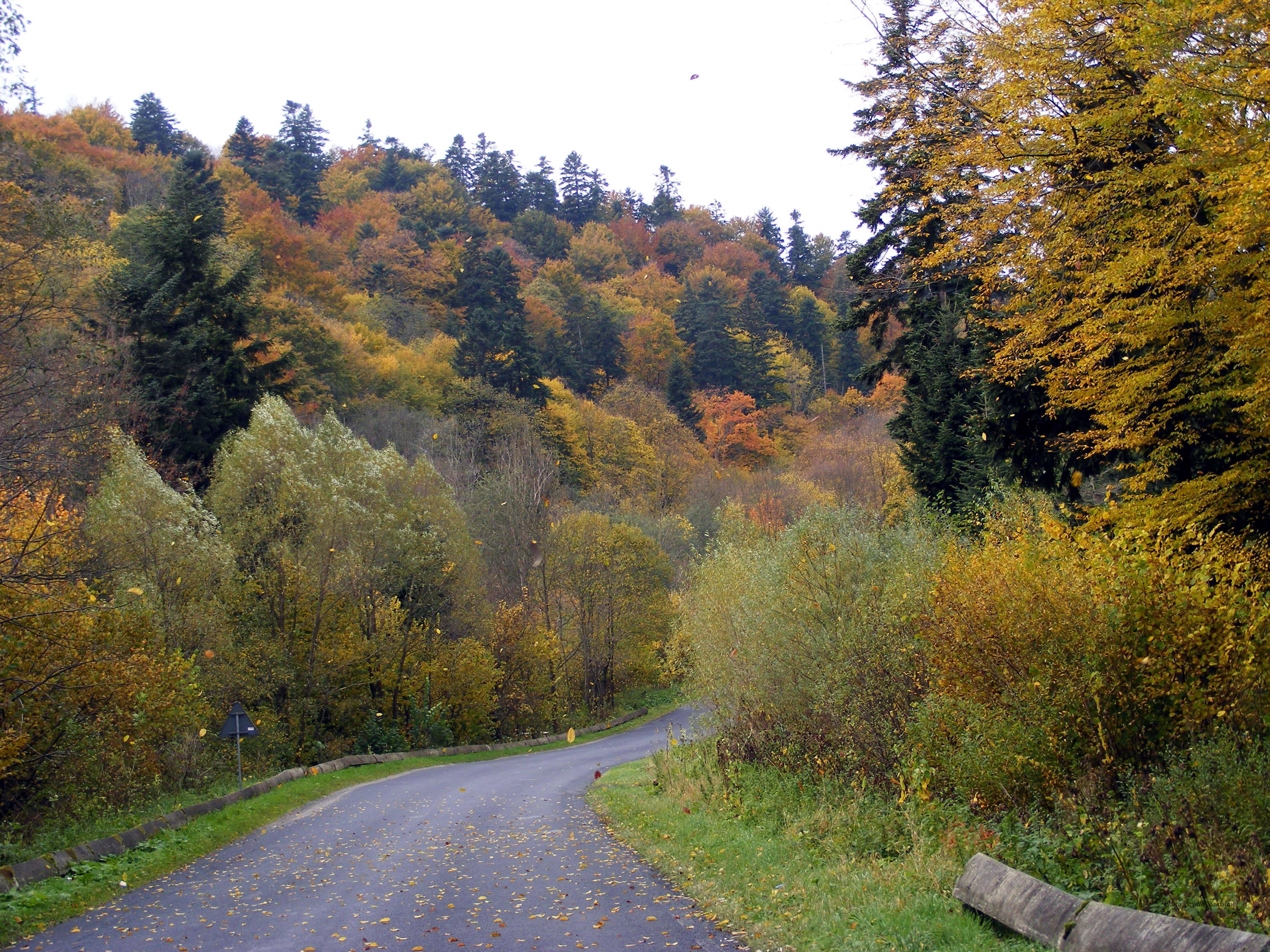
- Jaśliska Landscape Park in autumn
- Interactive map of Jaśliska Landscape Park
- Location: Podkarpackie Voivodeship
- Established: 1992

Jaśliska Landscape Park (Jaśliski Park Krajobrazowy) is a protected area (Landscape Park) in south-eastern Poland, established in 1992. It is named after the village of Jaśliska.

The Park lies within Podkarpackie Voivodeship. It covers an area of 258.78 square kilometers.

Within the Landscape Park are five nature reserves.
