= Iwonicz =

- Village
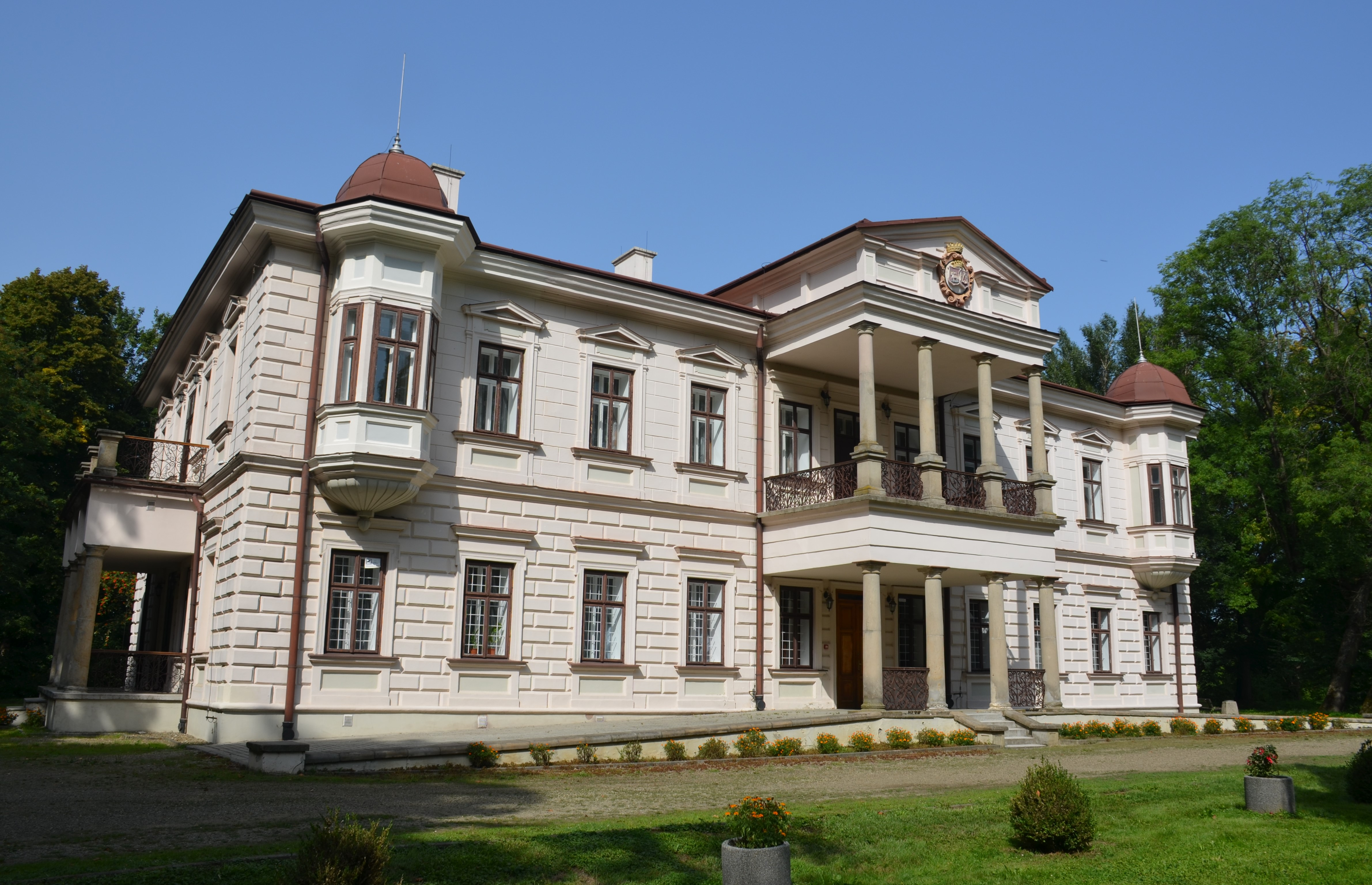
- Załuski Palace in Iwonicz

- Location within Poland
- Coordinates: 49°36′28″N 21°48′16″E
- Country: Poland
- Voivodeship: Subcarpathian
- County: Krosno
- Gmina: Iwonicz-Zdrój
- Elevation: 304 m (997 ft)

Population
  - Total: 4,509
- Time zone: UTC+1 (CET)
  - Summer (DST): UTC+2 (CEST)
- Vehicle registration: RKR

Iwonicz [iˈvɔnit͡ʂ] is a village in the administrative district of Gmina Iwonicz-Zdrój, within Krosno County, Subcarpathian Voivodeship, in south-eastern Poland.

== History ==
During the German occupation of Poland (World War II), in 1943–1944, the occupiers operated a forced labour camp for Jewish men in the village.
