= Gmina Jaśliska =

Gmina Jaśliska Jaśliska Commune
- Gmina
- Flag Coat of arms
- Interactive map of Gmina Jaśliska
- Coordinates (Jaśliska): 49°27′N 21°48′E
- Country: Poland
- Voivodeship: Subcarpathian
- County: Krosno County
- Seat: Jaśliska

Area
  - Total: 164.49 km^{2} (63.51 sq mi)

Population (2010)
  - Total: 1,700
  - Density: 10/km^{2} (27/sq mi)

Gmina Jaśliska is a rural gmina (administrative district) in Krosno County, Subcarpathian Voivodeship, in south-eastern Poland, on the Slovak border. Its seat is the village of Jaśliska.

Gmina Jaśliska was created as of 1 January 2010, out of part of Gmina Dukla. (Jaśliska was previously the seat of a gmina between 1934 and 1954, and between 1973 and 1976.)

== Villages ==
Gmina Jaśliska contains the sołectwos of Daliowa, Jaśliska, Posada Jaśliska, Szklary and Wola Niżna. Places in the gmina not having sołectwo status include Czeremcha, Lipowiec and Wola Wyżna.

== Neighbouring gminas ==
Gmina Jaśliska is bordered by the gminas of Dukla, Komańcza and Rymanów. It also borders Slovakia.
