= Lipowiec, Podkarpackie Voivodeship =

Lipowiec
- Village
- Location within Poland
- Coordinates: 49°24′44″N 21°46′50″E
- Country: Poland
- Voivodeship: Subcarpathian
- County: Krosno
- Gmina: Jaśliska
- Website: www.lipowiec.org

Lipowiec [lʲiˈpɔvʲɛt͡s] was a village in the administrative district of Gmina Jaśliska, within Krosno County, Subcarpathian Voivodeship, in south-eastern Poland, close to the border with Slovakia.
