= Wola Niżna =

- Village
- Location within Poland
- Coordinates: 49°25′49″N 21°50′34″E
- Country: Poland
- Voivodeship: Subcarpathian
- County: Krosno
- Gmina: Jaśliska
- Population: 290

Wola Niżna [ˈvɔla ˈɲiʐna] is a village in the administrative district of Gmina Jaśliska, within Krosno County, Subcarpathian Voivodeship, in south-eastern Poland, close to the border with Slovakia.
