= Czesław Zając =

Polish sports shooter (born 1927)

Personal information
- Born: 20 January 1927 (age 99) Lubatowa, Poland

Sport
- Sport: Sports shooting

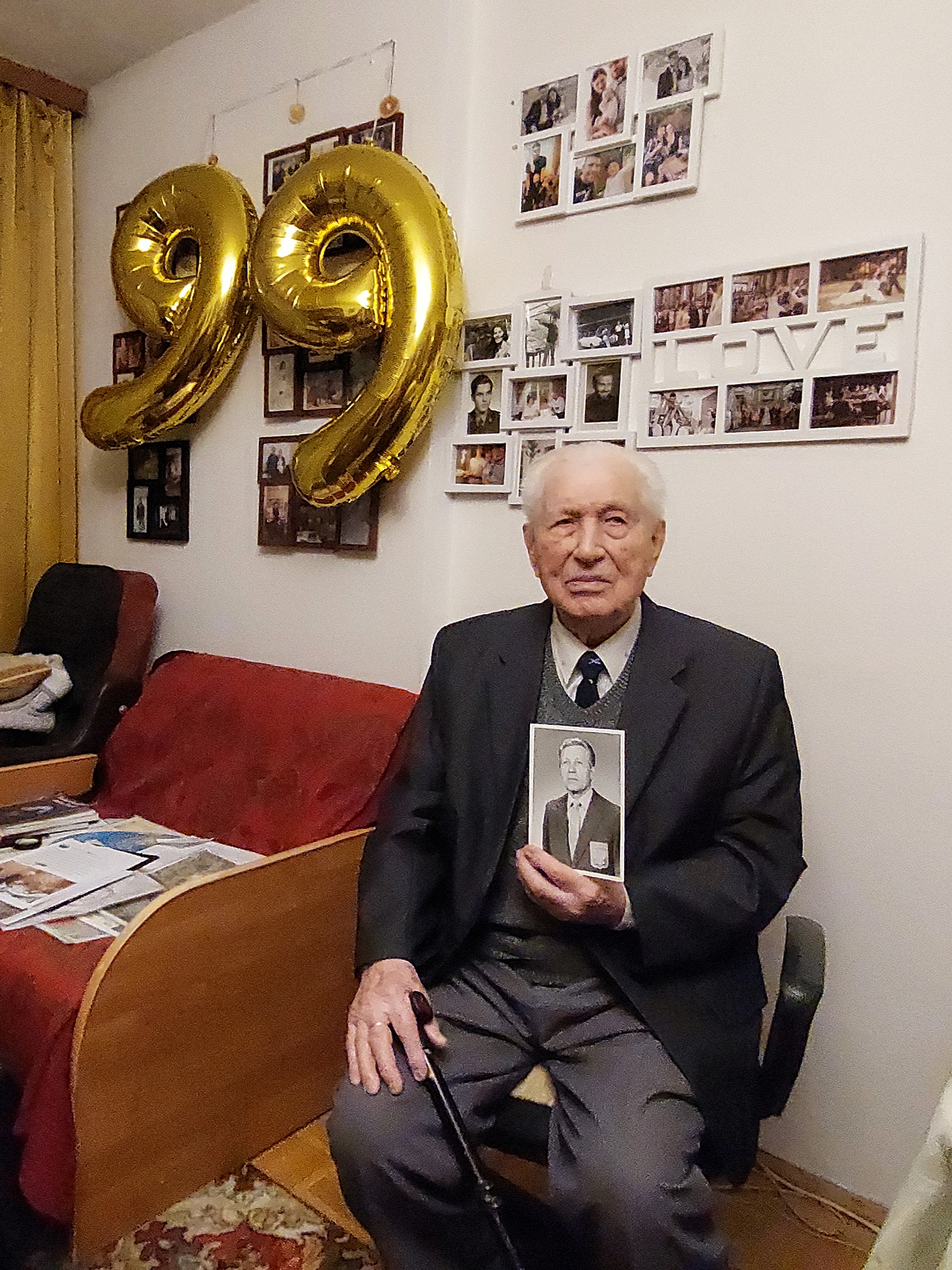
Czesław Zając at the age of 99

Czesław Zając (born 20 January 1927) is a Polish former sports shooter. He competed in the 25 metre pistol event at the 1960 Summer Olympics.
