= Piotruś =

Mountain in Poland

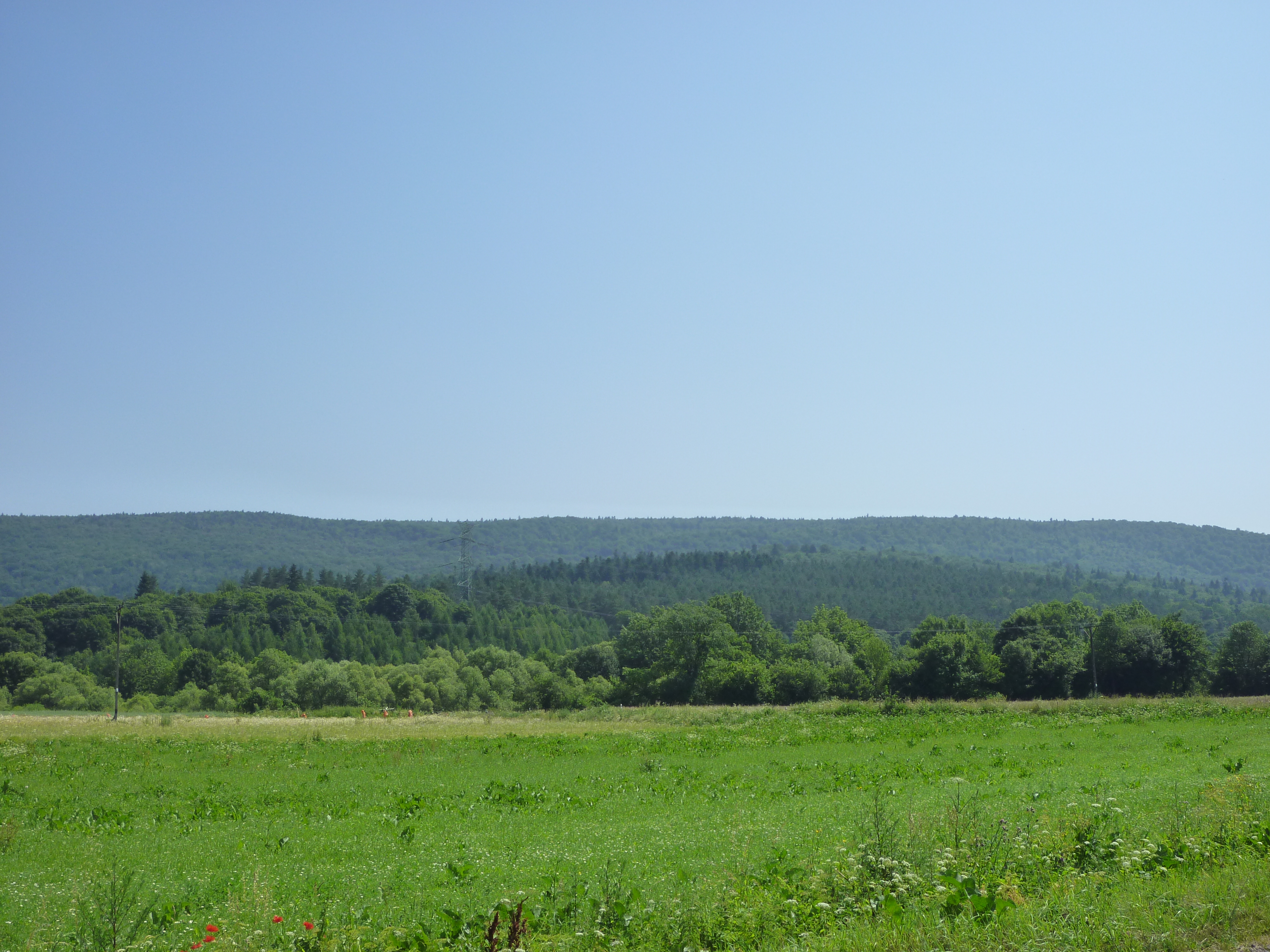

Highest point
- Elevation: 727 m (2,385 ft)
- Coordinates: 49°28′39″N 21°44′59″E

Geography
- Location: Poland
- Parent range: Low Beskids

Piotruś (also Petrus, Petros) is a 727-metre (2,385 ft) tall mountain in the Beskid Dukielski range, Poland. Beskid Dukielski forms the middle of the Low Beskids in the Western Carpathian Mountains.

Piotruś is the highest mountain of the Beskid Dukielski. A tourist trail passes through the mountain. Its most prominent characteristic is a stream and pond related to the Saint John of Dukla.

== Geology ==
The Beskid Dukielski Range is located within the outer part of the Carpathians, which is part of the Alpine orogenic belt. The Outer Carpathians fold and thrust belt, is subdivided into several nappes bounded by thrust faults. The mountain lies within the Dukla Nappe which is further faulted into smaller thrust sheets. The sequence that outcrops in this area consists of flysch type sedimentary rocks of Upper Cretaceous to Paleogene in age. Piotruś itself is formed of Oligocene age rocks, particularly the Menilite Beds, which contain the Mszanka Sandstones, the Jawornik Marls the Cergowa Sandstones or Shales with interbedded layers of Tylawa Limestone. Prominent ridges near the top of the mountain consist of thick-bedded layers of sandstone and conglomerate that form part of the Mszanka Sandstones.

== Physical characteristics ==
The tallest mountain in the Beskid Dukielski, Piotruś is relatively flat-structured, giving it its alternative name of Płazyna. The mountain is crescent-shaped, aligned roughly north-south. It is bounded to the west and south by the valley of the Jasiołka river, separating it from Ostra Mountain to the south. The mountain is covered in forest, primarily old beech trees, and near the top, in birch, European mountain-ash and alder. A spruce forest on Piotruś's western slope was mostly destroyed in a fire during the interwar period. A yellow sandstone rock is prominently displayed at the top of the mountain, which likely contributed to its name (Piotr – Polish for Peter – also means stone). Some of it was excavated for buildings, and several unused large blocks can be found.

The mountain is the source for numerous streams, which form small ponds the largest of which is known as the Murowana Studnia. Another pond (Holy Water, Polish: Święta Woda) is linked to the legend of Saint John of Dukla, who is said to have rested there. There is also a "Papal stone" ("Kamień papieski), commemorating the presence of Karol Wojtyła here. A small chapel was raised in the site in 2005.

There are plans to extend a nearby nature reserve "Przełom Jaskółki" to the southern slopes of Piotruś.

== Trails ==
A short yellow tourist trail passes through Piotruś. The trail starts at Dukla and goes through Cergowa (mountain), Zawadka Rymanowska and Piotruś to Stasnianie.
