= Zyndram's Hill =

Coordinates: 49.5548°N 20.4651°E

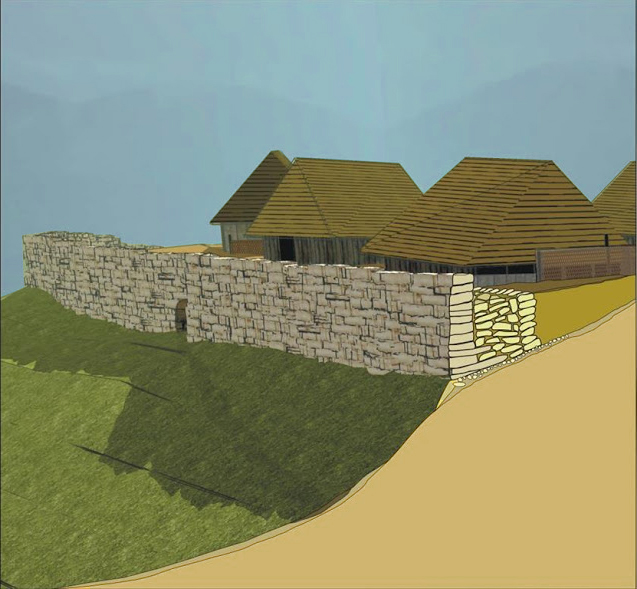
Early Bronze Age fortified settlement reconstruction.

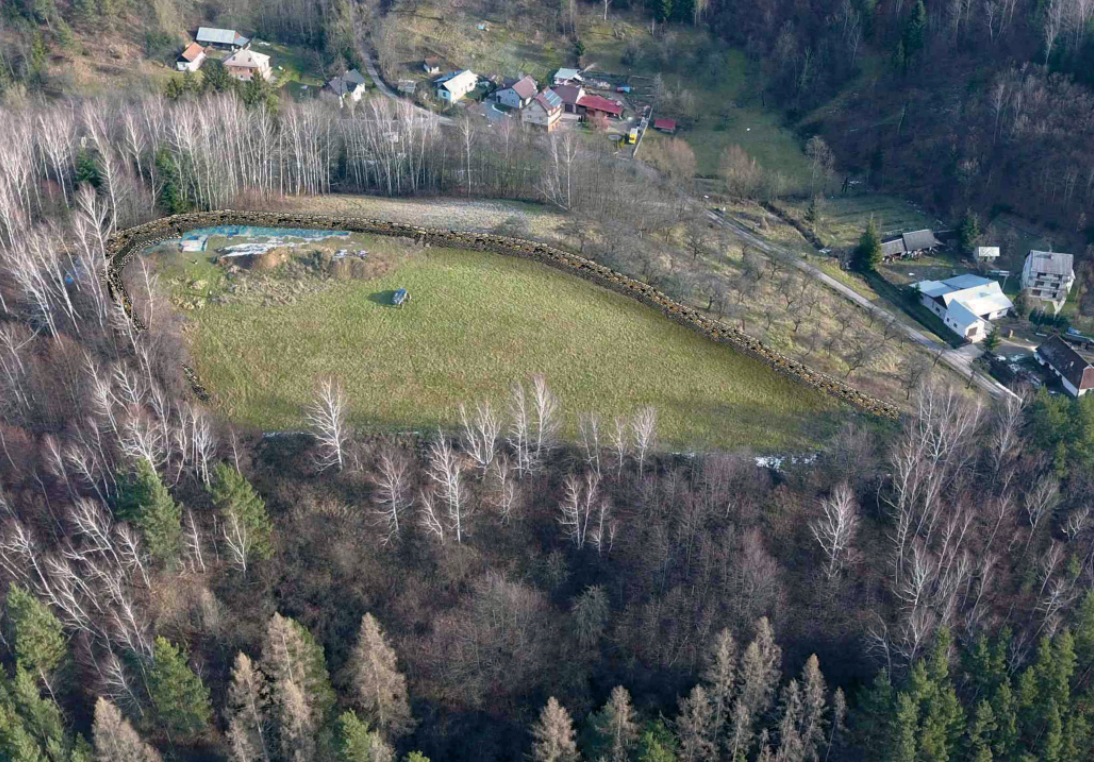
Digital reconstruction of the stone fortification wall

Zyndram’s Hill (pol. Góra Zyndrama) is an archaeological site located in southern Poland, in Maszkowice village, Łącko commune. It was a prehistoric defensive settlement occupied in the Early Bronze Age (1750-1550 BC), in the Late Bronze Age and Early Iron Age (950-400 BC) and in the La Tène Period (200-50 BC).

The hill itself is a part of the Beskid Wyspowy range, which belongs to the Northern Carpathians area. The site is located 410 meters above the sea level and its plateau is rising significantly (several dozen meters) above the Łącko Basin and the Dunajec river valley. In the 60's and 70's it was excavated by Maria Cabalska from the Jagiellonian University in Kraków. Marcin S. Przybyła (also from JU in Kraków) has undertaken new research project since 2010. The new excavations and studies brought a spectacular bunch of informations.

Analysis of the artifacts proves that at first (1750-1550 BC) the settlement was inhabited most probably by a population of the Ottomány culture. In this period (ca. 1750 BC) a monumental stone wall construction was built around the hillfort's plateau (the local sources of sandstone was used). This example of stone architecture is one of the oldest in Europe (excluding the Mediterranean Area and the British Isles) and it is the oldest in Poland. The stone wall of the Zyndram's Hill in terms of technical solutions has connections with Alpine and Mediterranean constructions. That suggests that some of the founders of the settlement were from the southern parts of Europe. Archaeologists discovered also the remains of dwellings from this period.

The plateau was inhabited afresh in the Late Bronze Age after a 500-year-long hiatus. The settlement of the second phase (950-400 BC) was most probably much bigger. According to the stratigraphic observations the remains of the earliest stone construction was reused. The wooden and earthen fortifications were also built. The population of this phase was most probably related to more local societies of the Carpathian area (i.e. the Gava culture) and the tradition of the so-called Urnfield culture.

The last settlement episode may be connected with the La Tène Period (200-50 BC). Zyndram's Hill was inhabited by the population of the Puchov culture. It is assumed that the occupied area shrunk significantly in this period.

Local tradition and legends wanted to relate Zyndram's Hill with the castle of Zyndram of Maszkowice (a Polish medieval knight and royal official). This assumption was denied by the archaeologists who proved the prehistorical origin of the hillfort and its fortifications.

== Gallery ==
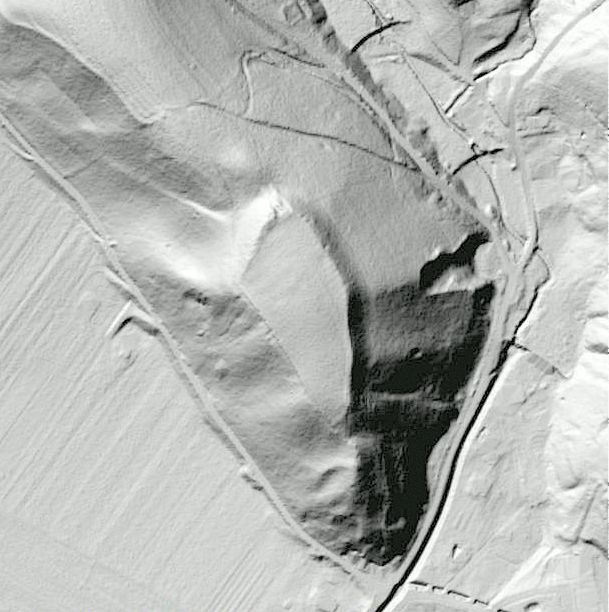
Zyndram's Hill topography

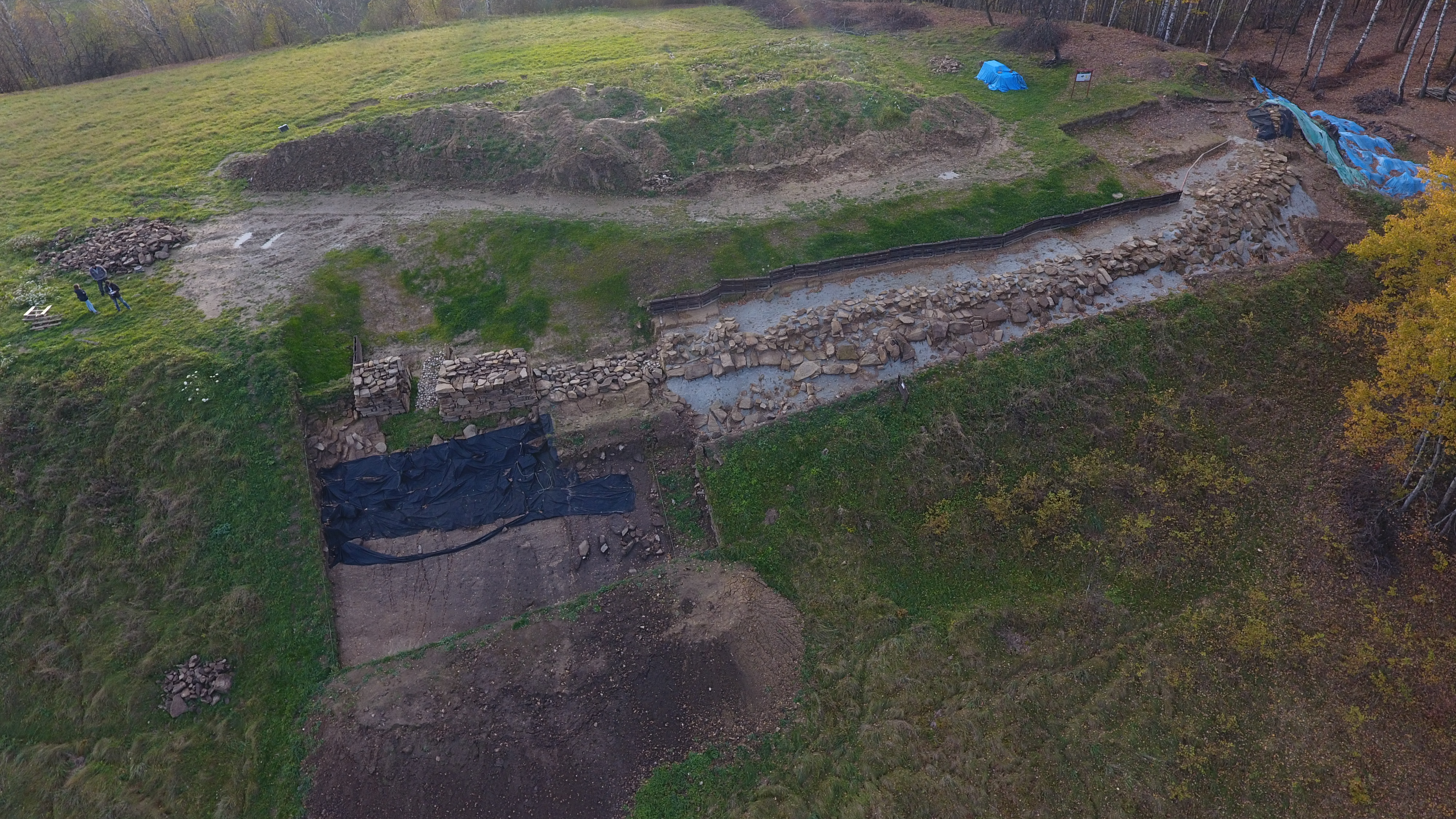
Excavation and partial reconstruction of the stone wall

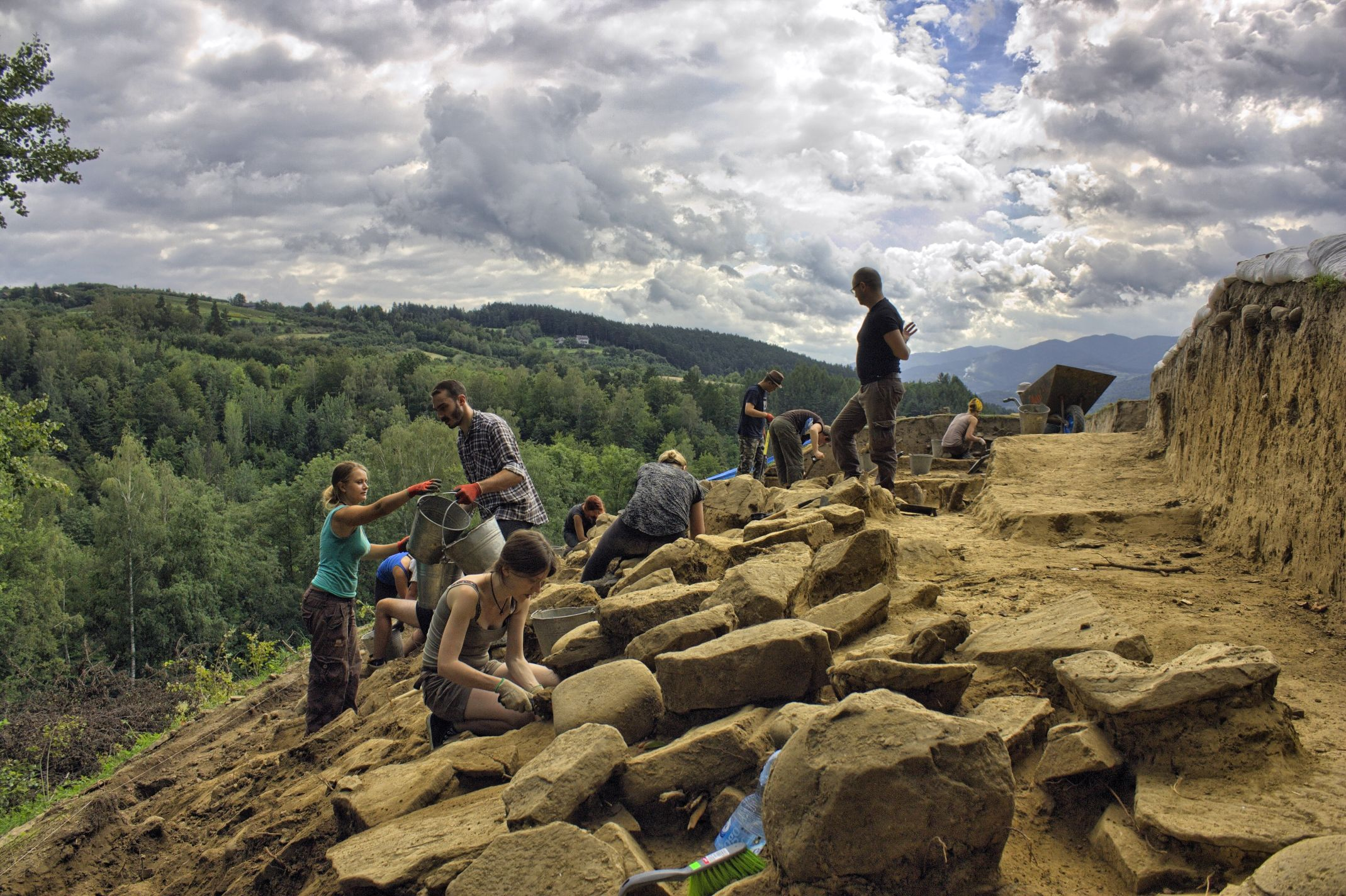
Excavation of the site

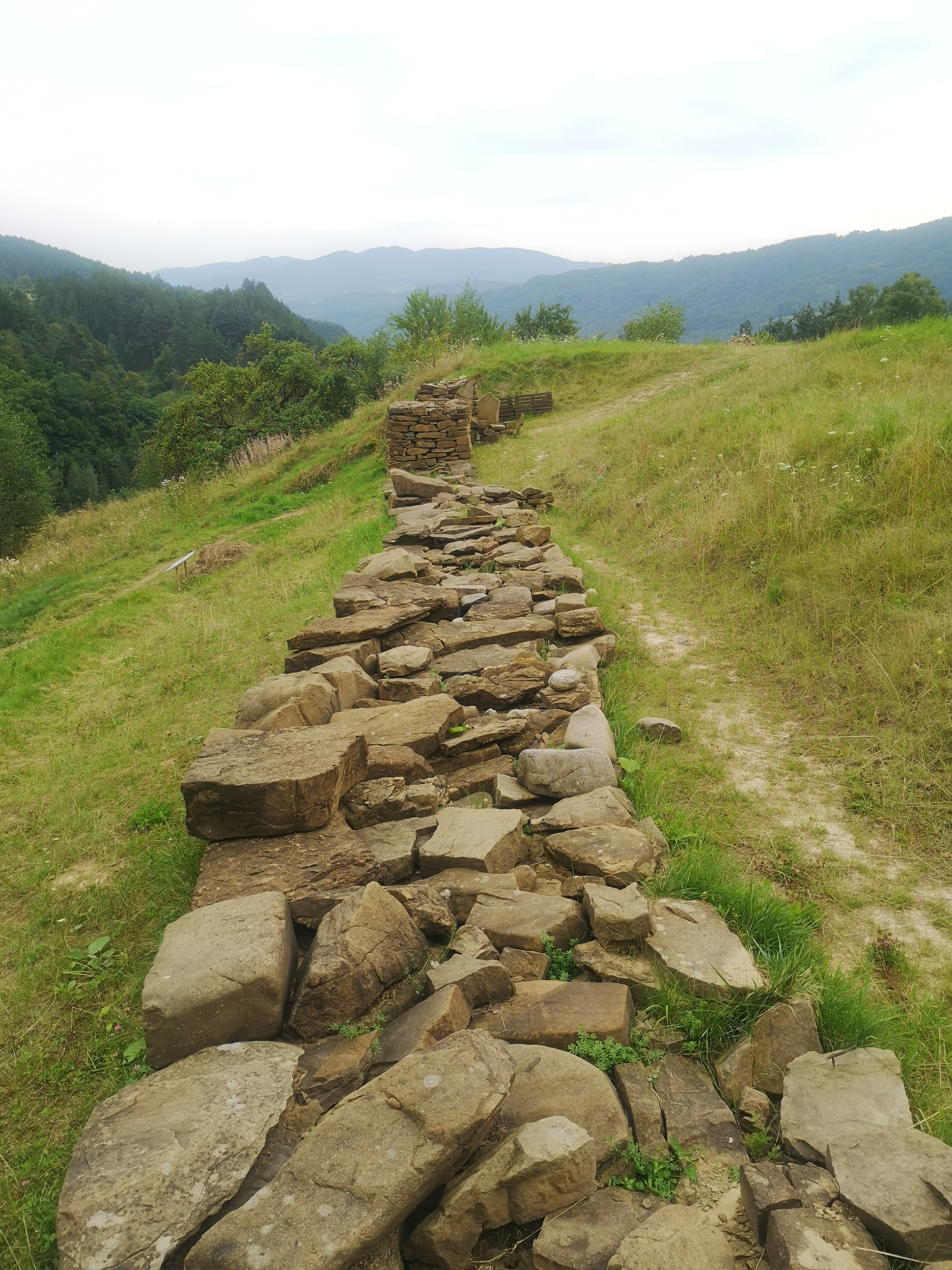
Wall remains at Zyndram's Hill

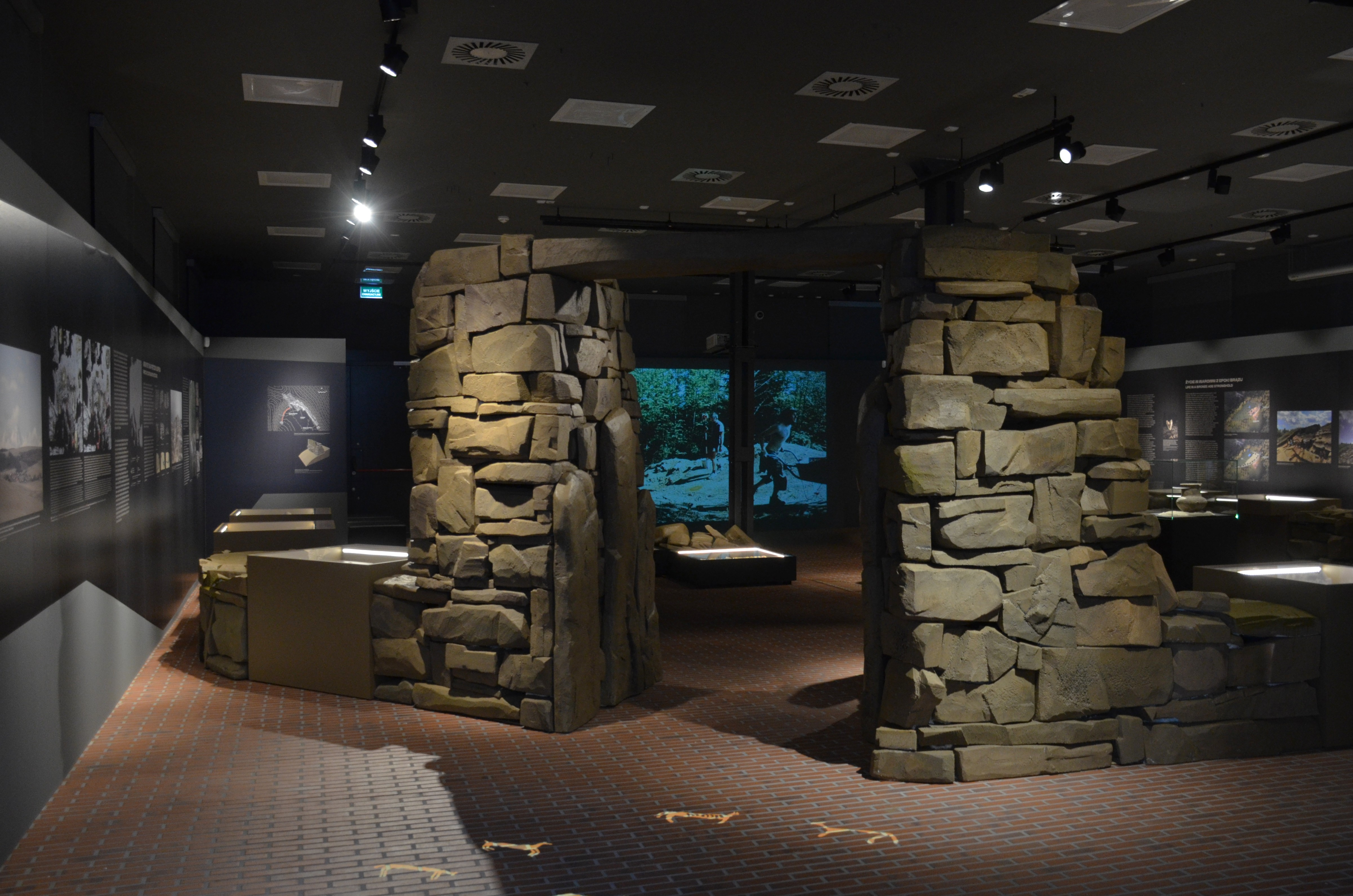
Reconstruction of the main entrance
