= Gmina Iwonicz-Zdrój =

Gmina Iwonicz-Zdrój Iwonicz-Zdrój Commune
- Gmina
- Coat of arms
- Interactive map of Gmina Iwonicz-Zdrój
- Coordinates (Iwonicz-Zdrój): 49°34′24″N 21°47′37″E
- Country: Poland
- Voivodeship: Subcarpathian
- County: Krosno County
- Seat: Iwonicz-Zdrój

Area
  - Total: 45.5 km^{2} (17.6 sq mi)

Population (2006)
  - Total: 10,945
  - Density: 241/km^{2} (623/sq mi)
  - Urban: 1,891
  - Rural: 9,054
- Website: https://web.archive.org/web/20071029025753/http://www.iwonicz-zdroj.pl/j/

Gmina Iwonicz-Zdrój is an urban-rural gmina (administrative district) in Krosno County, Subcarpathian Voivodeship, in south-eastern Poland. Its seat is the town of Iwonicz-Zdrój, which lies approximately 13 kilometres (8 mi) south of Krosno and 54 km (34 mi) south of the regional capital Rzeszów.

The gmina covers an area of 45.5 square kilometres (17.6 sq mi), and as of 2006 its total population is 10,945 (out of which the population of Iwonicz-Zdrój amounts to 1,891, and the population of the rural part of the gmina is 9,054).

== Villages ==
Apart from the town of Iwonicz-Zdrój, the gmina contains the villages (sołectwos) of Iwonicz, Lubatowa and Lubatówka.

== Neighbouring gminas ==
Gmina Iwonicz-Zdrój is bordered by the gminas of Dukla, Miejsce Piastowe and Rymanów.
