= Battle of Grunwald (Matejko) =

1878 painting by Jan Matejko

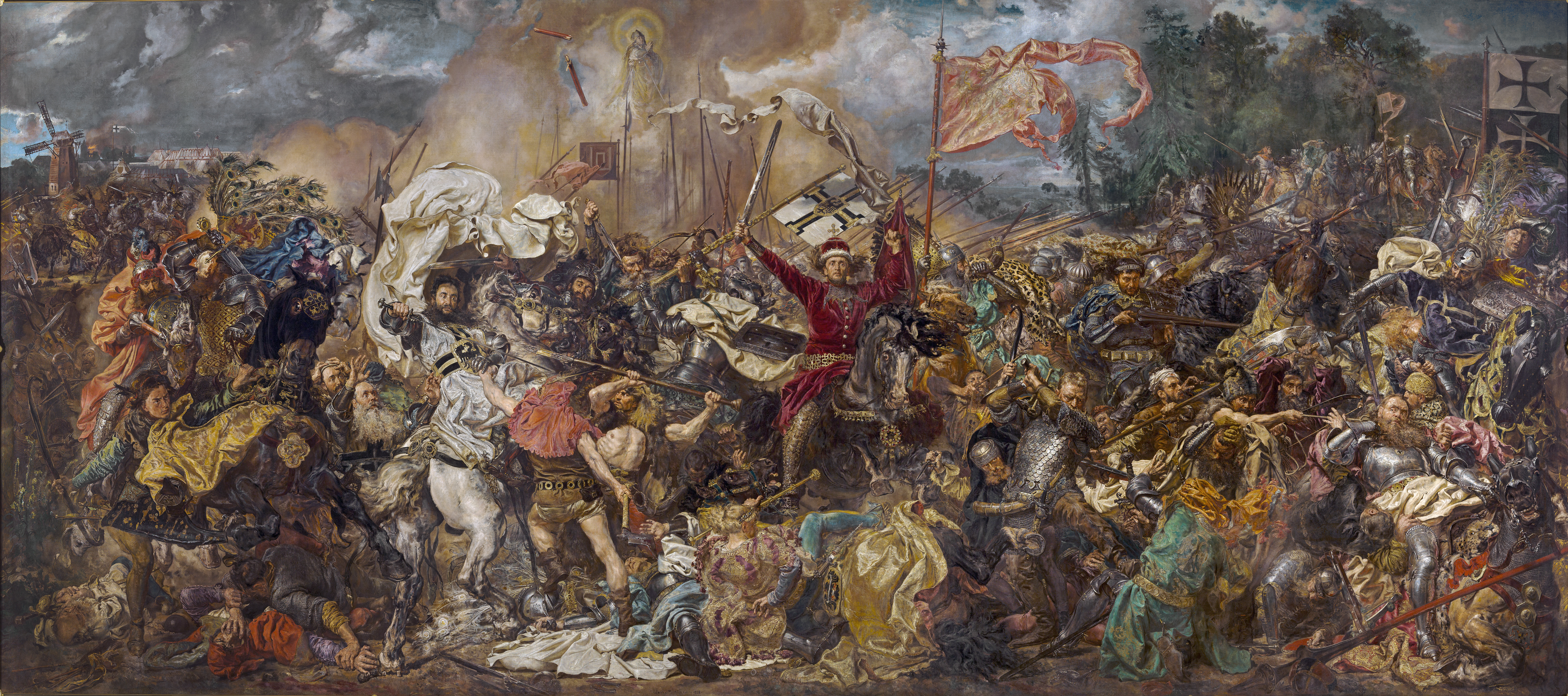
- Artist: Jan Matejko
- Year: 1878
- Medium: Oil on canvas
- Dimensions: 426 cm × 987 cm (168 in × 389 in)
- Location: National Museum, Warsaw

The Battle of Grunwald is a painting by Jan Matejko depicting the Battle of Grunwald and the victory of the allied Crown of the Kingdom of Poland and Grand Duchy of Lithuania over the Teutonic Order in 1410. The canvas dates to 1878 and is one of the most heroic representations of the history of Poland and Lithuania. It is displayed in the National Museum in Warsaw.

The painting's main focus is the death scene of the Grand Master of the Teutonic Order, Ulrich von Jungingen; another central figure is the Lithuanian grand duke Vytautas the Great, dressed in red with a raised sword. The painting has been both hailed and criticized for its complexity. It is one of Matejko's most recognizable works, and has likely contributed to the popular image of the battle of Grunwald, and its enduring fame in Polish and Lithuanian consciousness.

== History ==
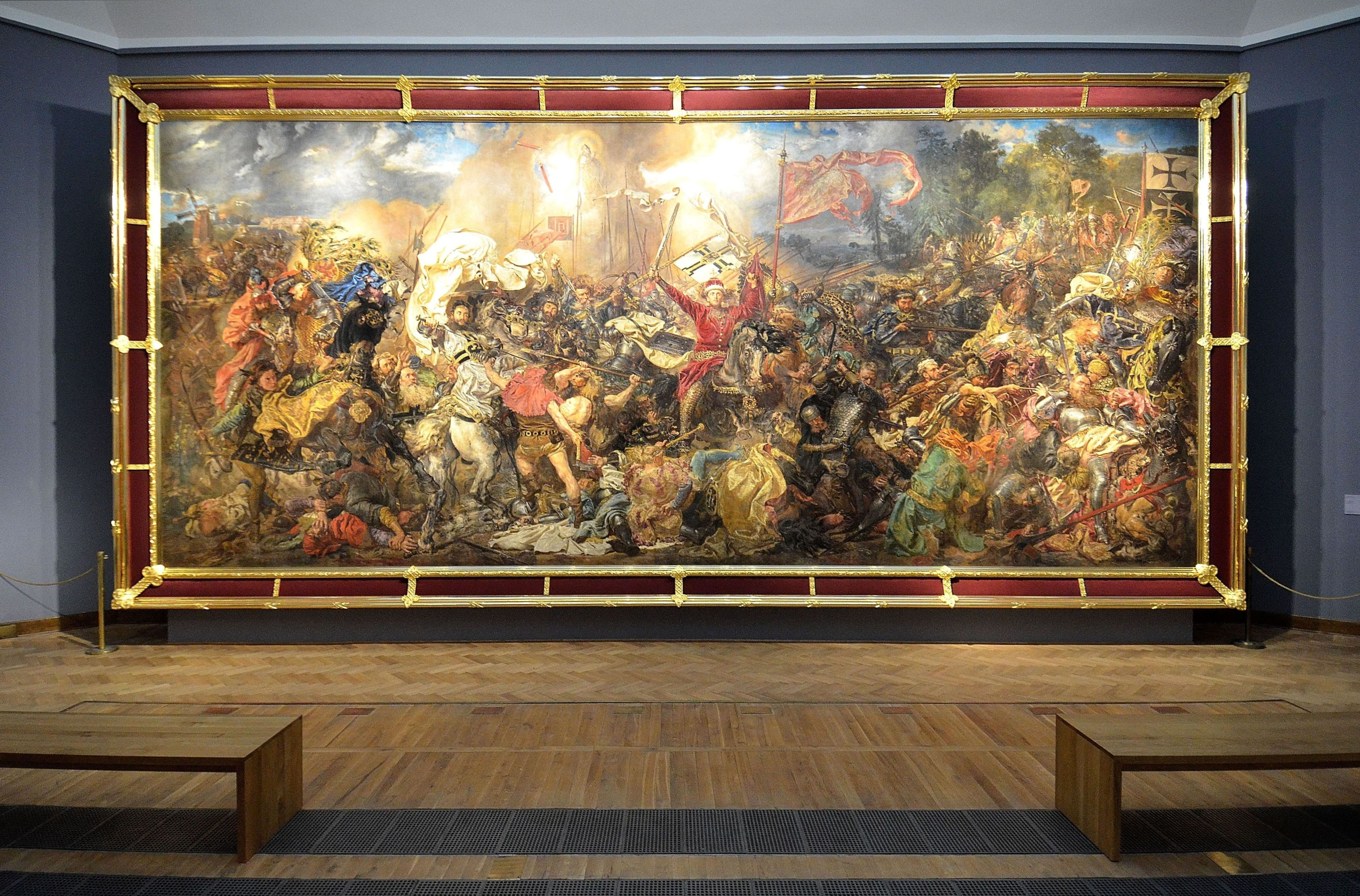
The Battle of Grunwald displayed in the National Museum in Warsaw

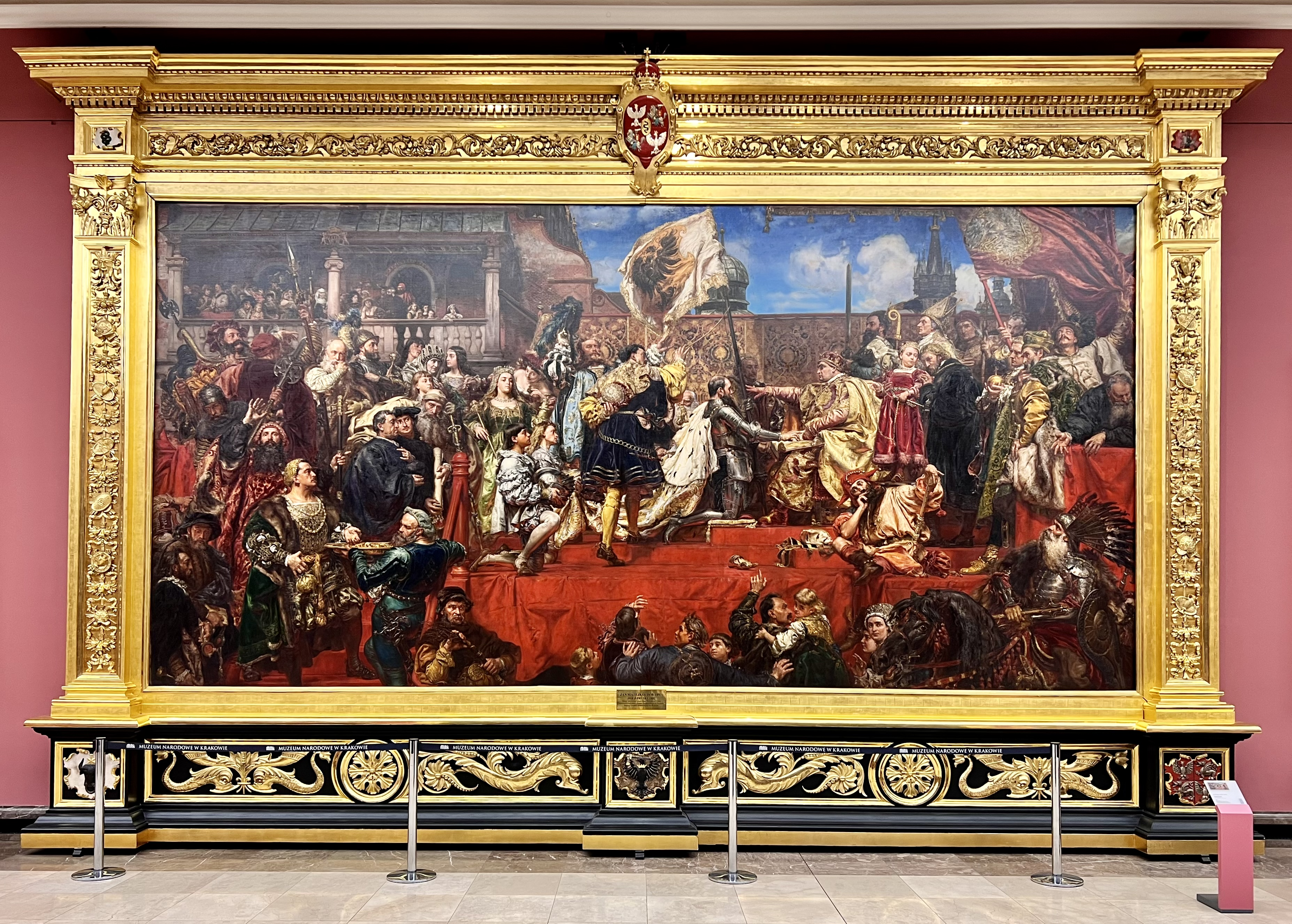
Prussian Homage. National Museum in Kraków

Matejko began collecting materials for the painting in 1871. He started painting the canvas some time in 1872 and finished it in 1878. Soon afterwards, he received a scepter from the council of Kraków in an official ceremony, in recognition of his work and his position as one of the most respected Polish artists. The painting was sold that year to Dawid Rosenblum, a private individual in Warsaw. Displayed in numerous international exhibitions, in 1902 the painting was bought from Rosenblum's heirs by the Society for the Encouragement of Fine Arts (Towarzystwo Zachęty Sztuk Pięknych) and displayed in Warsaw.

Like many other works, the Battle of Grunwald was hidden by Poles, during the occupation of Poland by Nazi Germany. Together with Prussian Homage, it was one of the two artworks that topped the "most wanted" paintings list made by the Nazis, who engaged in a systematic action of physical destruction of all artifacts of Polish culture. Goebbels offered a bounty of 10 million marks for it, and several members of the Polish Underground were executed by the Germans when they refused to divulge its location despite interrogation and torture. The painting survived the war years hidden near Lublin.

Restored after World War II, since 1949 this oil painting has been on display in the National Museum in Warsaw. In 1999 the Battle of Grunwald was loaned to Lithuania, where it garnered a positive reception. By the 2000s, the painting needed restoration. In 2010, the poor condition of the painting prevented its inclusion in a special exhibition at Wawel Castle to mark the 600th anniversary of the battle. The painting was renovated, with the work finished in 2012. After restoration the painting is once again on display at the National Museum.

== Composition ==
The Battle of Grunwald is a painting by Matejko that portrays events from the history of Poland and Lithuania, the Grand Duchy of Lithuania and the struggles of Eastern European principalities against Teutonic knights in general. In the center of the painting is the Lithuanian grand duke Vytautas the Great, dressed in red with a raised sword. Vytautas holds a more prominent position in the painting than his cousin, Polish king Władysław Jagiełło (Jogaila), who is visible in the second plan, mounted, in the top right side. According to Scales and Zimmer, by focusing on Vytautas rather than Jagiełło, Matejko stressed the importance of Lithuania for Poland, and the value of cooperation between the two countries in the Polish–Lithuanian union. Others have noted that this placement likely was influenced by Matejko's reliance on the writings of Jan Długosz, who attributed greater importance to Vytautas than to Jagiełło, who, by some Polish sources, commanded the battle. While Lithuanian sources claim that Vytautas The Great have got the very major role in the battle by actually commanding troops and performing the decisive feigned retreat manoeuvre. In the skies above the carnage, Saint Stanislaus, a patron of Poland, overlooks the fighting.

Another central scene depicts the death of the Grand Master of the Teutonic Order, Ulrich von Jungingen. Dressed in white Order garb and riding a white horse, von Jungingen is being killed by two anonymous figures, which historian of art Danuta Batorska identifies as "savage looking Lithuanian peasants". One of them wields a Saint Maurice Spear (one of the objects with the claim to be the Spear of Destiny), which according to historian of art Jarosław Krawczyk implies that Matejko saw Jungingen's death as a retribution for taking arms against another Christian ruler. Next to the spearman is an executioner, who symbolizes the punishment Jungingen receives for the Order raids and pillages against the common folk. Those symbolic figures are one of many liberal interpretation that Matejko took with his painting; furthermore, modern scholarship indicates that he died in a cavalry duel, and not at the hands of a peasant.

Battle of Grunwald, selected battle themes
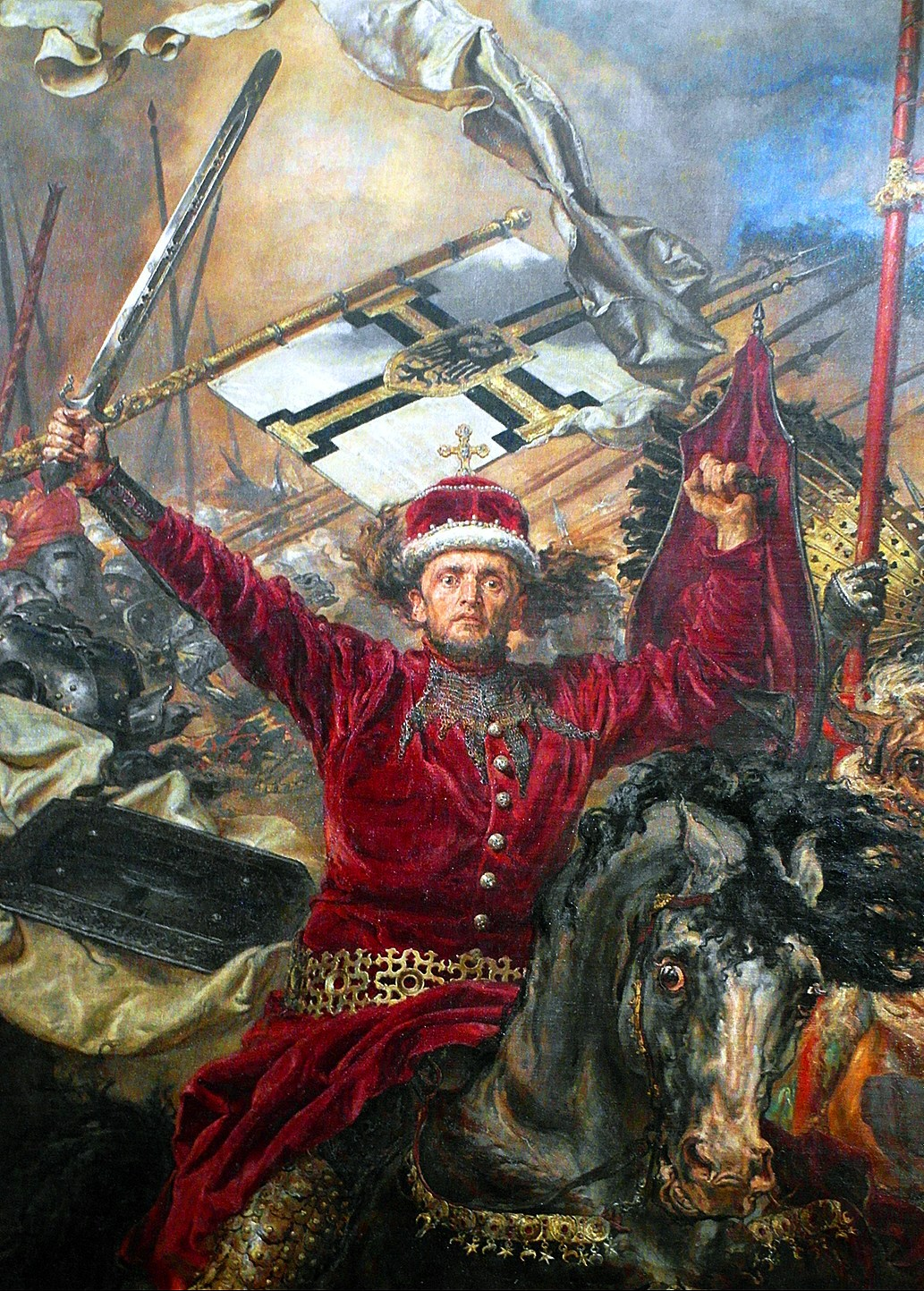
Vytautas the Great

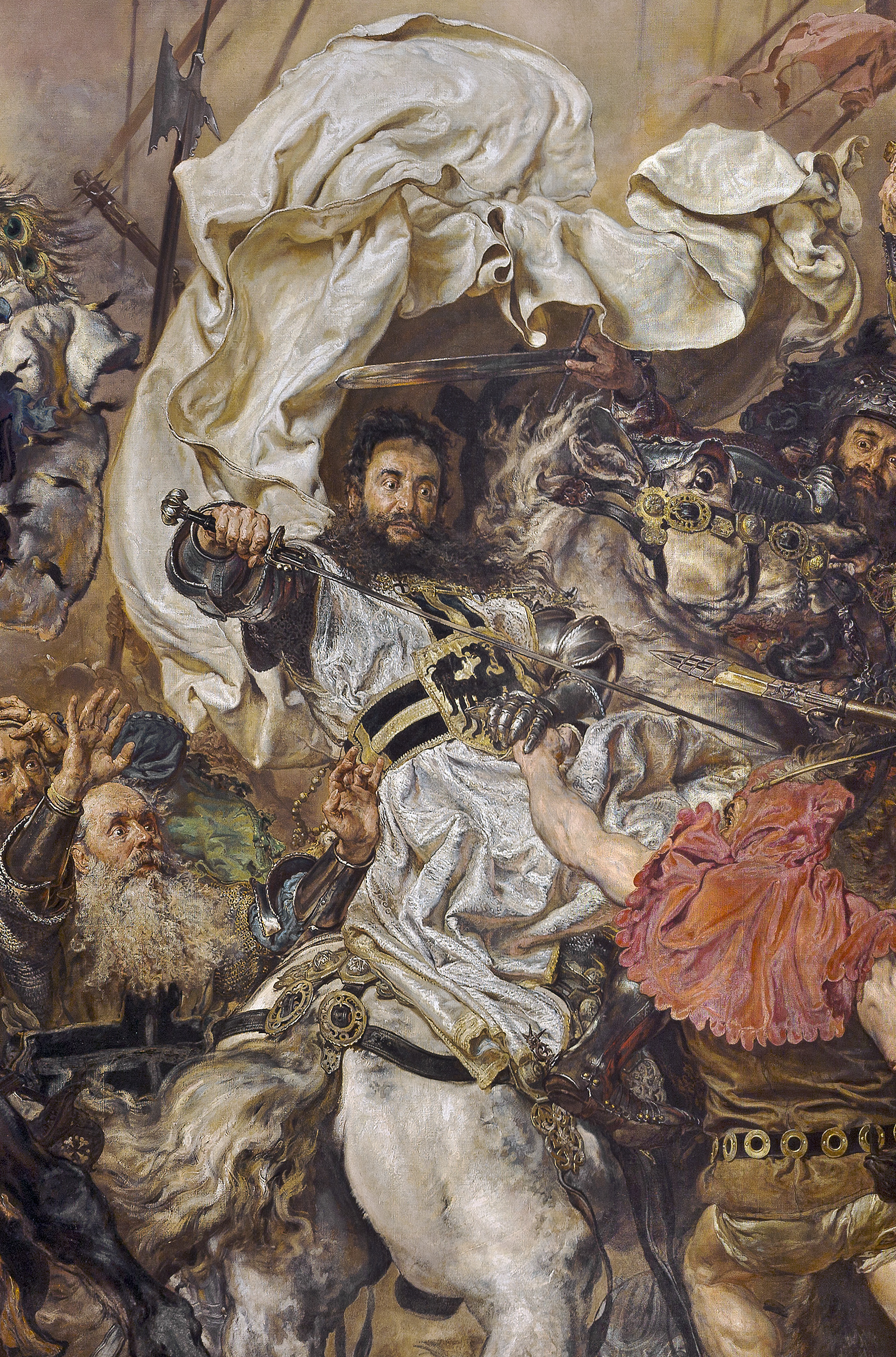
Ulrich von Jungingen

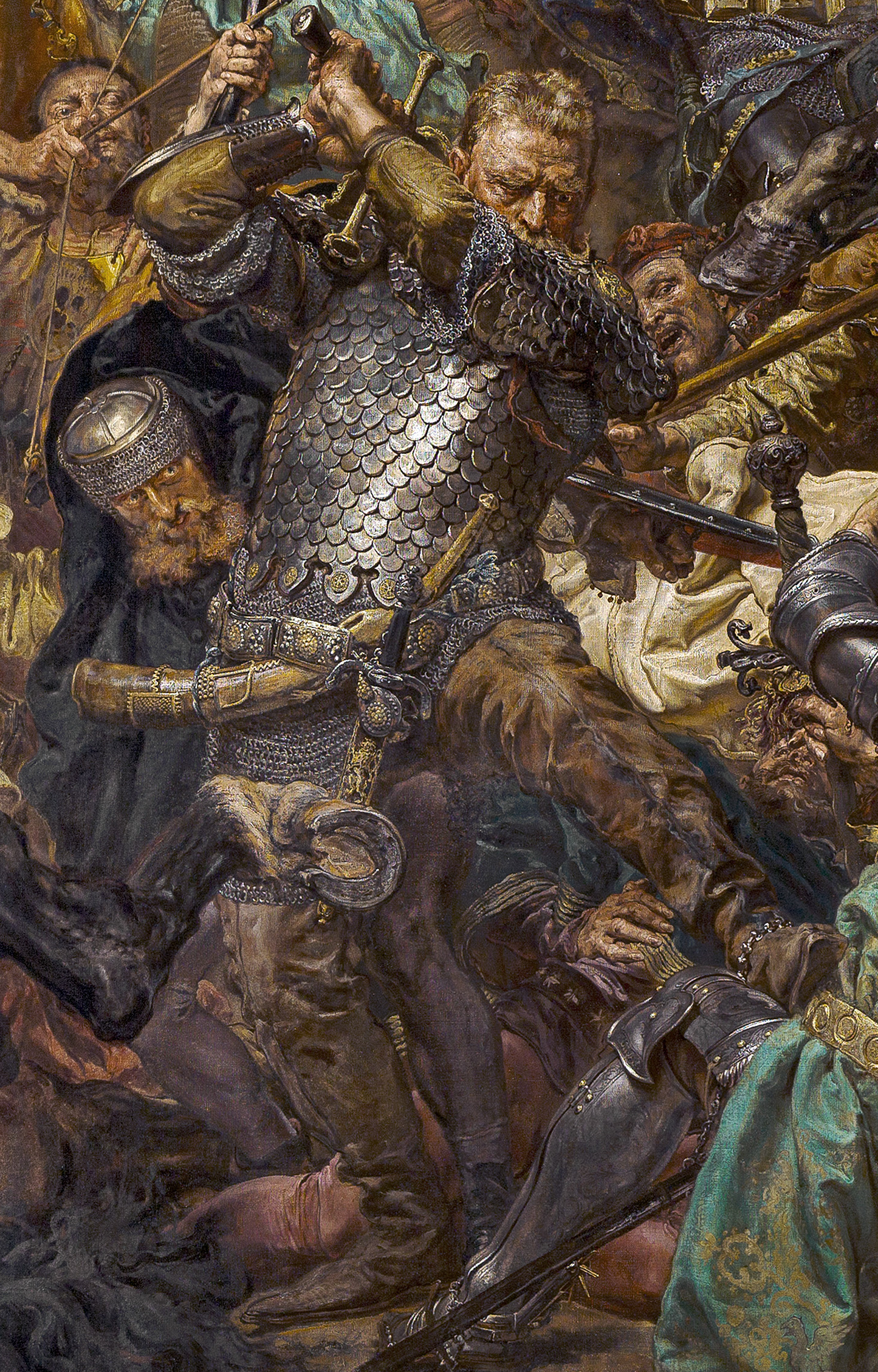
Jan Žižka
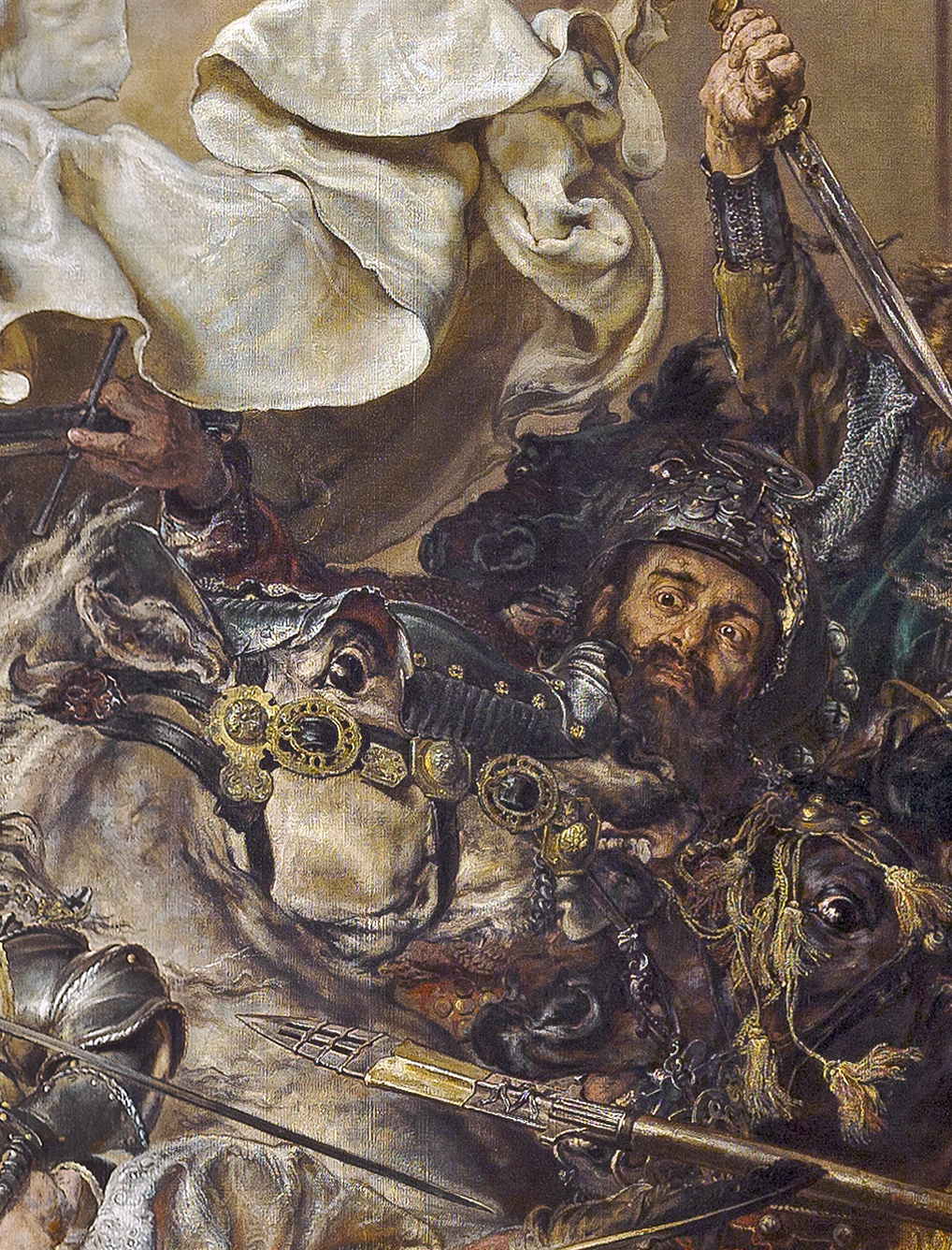
Zyndram of Maszkowice

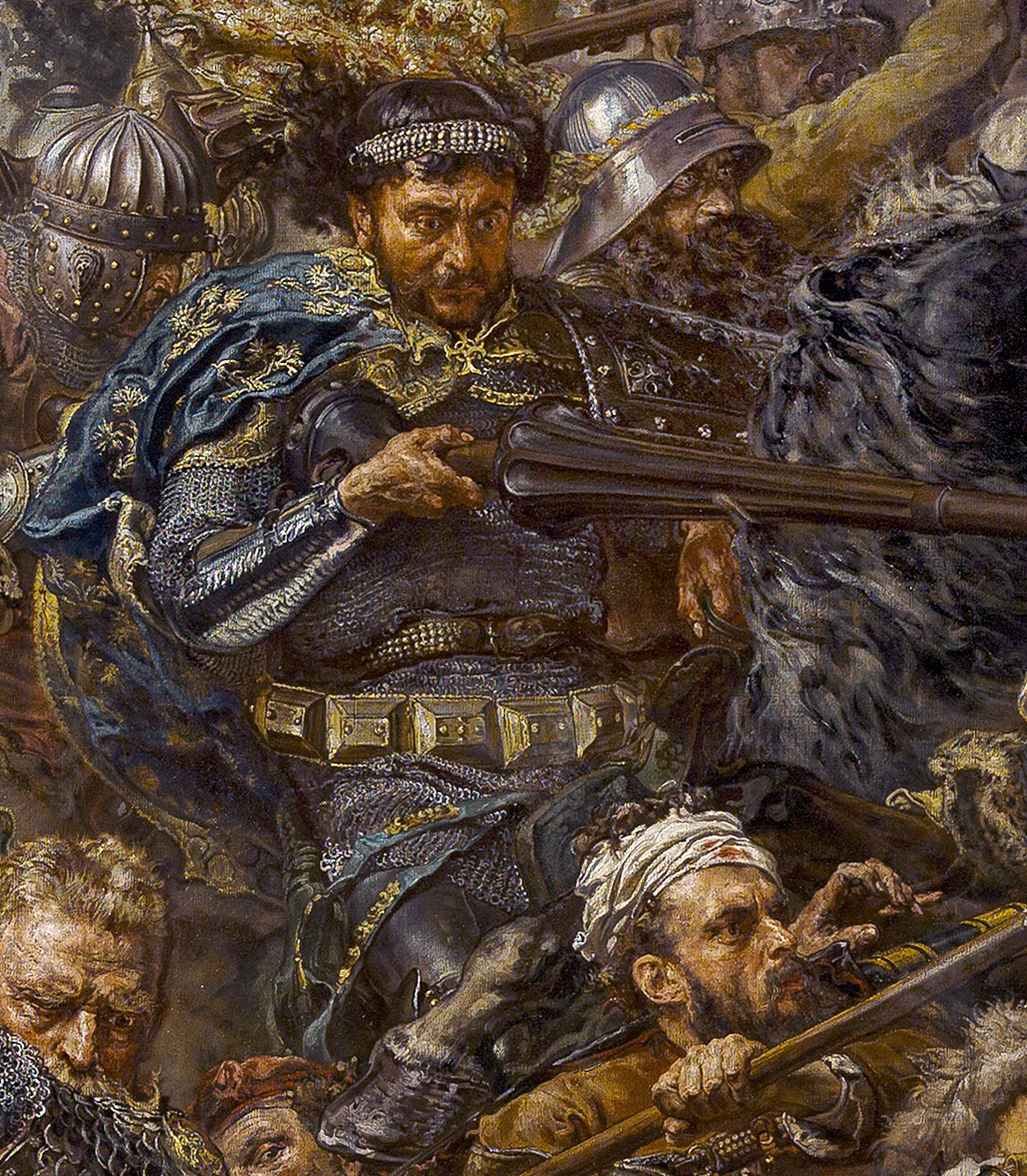
Zawisza Czarny

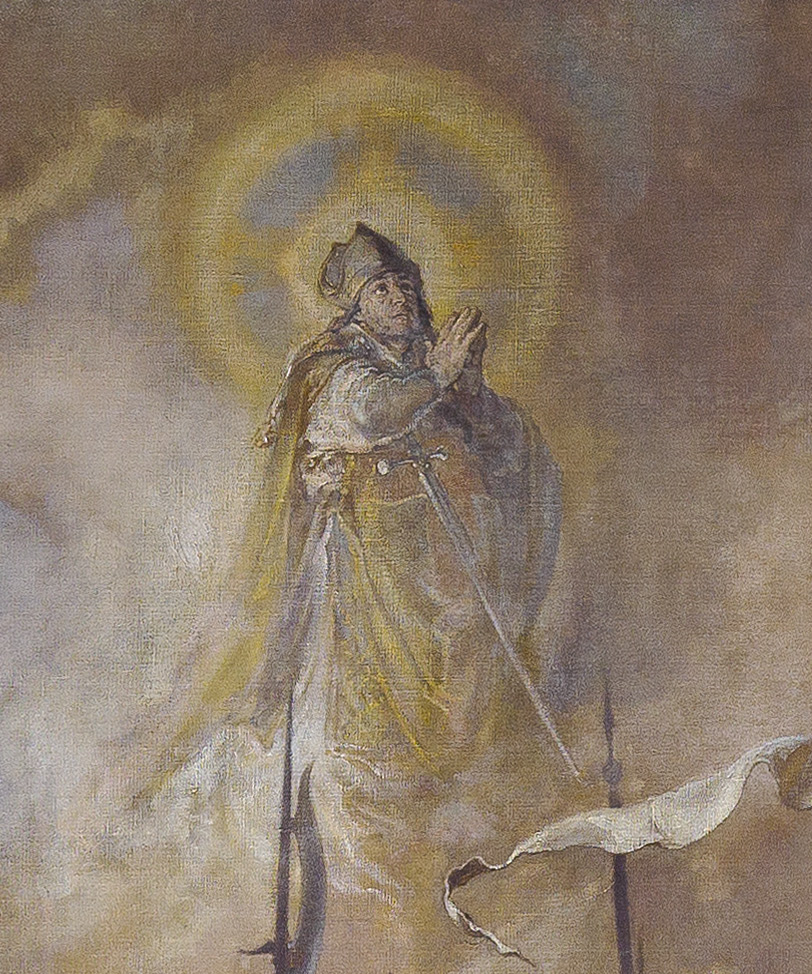
Saint Stanislaus

Other notable figures depicted in the painting include:

- Marcin of Wrocimowice, Polish knight, is holding the Polish banner in the center, next to Vytautas;
- Zyndram of Maszkowice, another Polish knight, is holding a sword over von Jungingen's head;
- Mikołaj Skunarowski (also known as Skunaczewski) is another Polish knight, standing next to Zyndram; after the battle he would be sent with the capture standard to Kraków, as a symbol of victory;
- Werner von Tettingen, German knight and one of the Teutonic Order's leaders, witnesses his leader's death from the left side of the painting;
- near von Tettingen, Casimir V, Duke of Pomerania, an ally of the Order, is taken prisoner by the knight Jakub Skarbek z Góry and his squire;
- at the bottom, Konrad VII the White is taken prisoner, and Kuno von Lichtenstein is dying. Matejko portrayed Konrad as a traitor, whereas German knight von Lichtenstein is shown dying with honor;
- to the right, Jan Žižka, a Czech ally of Poland, is killing a German knight Heinrich von Schwelborn. Edmund Matejko posed for the figure;
- next to Žižka, Zawisza Czarny is taking down another German knight;
- to the right of Zawisza, in a shining steel helmet, is another Polish knight, Domarat Grzymalczyk of Kobylany, later a castellan of Lublin;
- German knight Marquard von Salzbach is captured by a wild looking warrior identified as a Tatar or a Cossack;
- another German knight is clutching von Salzbach's garb, this is Johan von Wenden;
- future Grand Master Heinrich von Plauen is to the right of the painting as well, escaping to organize the defense of the remains of the Order's territory;
- behind von Plauen is a figure Matejko identified as Krzysztof, bishop of Lübeck. Modern historians have however failed to associate this figure with any historical person, noting that there was no bishop of this or similar time at contemporary Lübeck;
- to the right of von Plauen is a Polish knight and dignitary Jan Długosz of Niedzielsk, father of the chronicler Jan Długosz;
- future cardinal Zbigniew Oleśnicki is shown as one of Jagiełło's advisers. Near Władysław are also: his relative, Zygmunt Korybut, Deputy Chancellor of the Crown, Mikołaj Trąba, Siemowit IV, Duke of Masovia. On the ground under Oleśnicki is the body of the German knight Dippold Kikeritz who tried to charge Jagiełło, but was felled by his entourage.

Matejko combined three key parts of the battle into one tableau: an opportunistic attack by German knight Kökeritz on Jagiełło, the death of the Grand Master, and the taking of the Teutonic camp (in the top left corner). Unlike many other paintings of battles, the Battle of Grunwald does not separate the viewer from the action; instead it places him at the center of it. Matejko said he felt like a "possessed man" while he made the painting.

Matejko based the painting in part on a description of the battle in Długosz' chronicles, which accounts for several historical inaccuracies. At the same time, he was meticulous about correctly depicting the terrain of the battle, having visited the site of the conflict in 1877.

== Significance ==
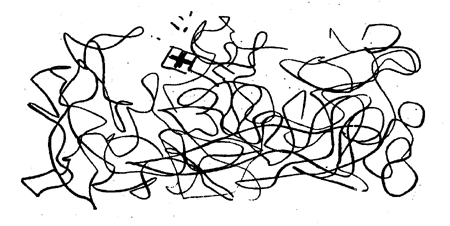
Wyspiański's parody of the painting

The painting has been called a masterpiece depiction of a battle scene, and much more than a simple depiction of a bloody battle. It is a complex picture, requiring more than a cursory look; a French critic, viewing it in Paris in 1879, declared that it was a museum in its own right, requiring eight days of study before one could properly appreciate it. At the same time, critics have pointed to the unrealistic depiction of the battle, and some anachronistic accessories present in the painting. Others have criticized the painting for being too crowded and chaotic.

The painting can be seen as Matejko's warning to Otto von Bismarck, whose Germanization policies (Kulturkampf) targeted Polish culture, reminding him of the Polish victory over the Teutons. Overall, the painting was intended to raise the spirits of the Polish people during the period when Poland had been partitioned and no longer existed as an independent state.

The painting, one of Matejko's most recognizable works and one of the best known paintings in Poland, likely has contributed to the popular image of the battle of Grunwald, and its enduring fame in Polish consciousness. The painting inspired Stanisław Wyspiański, who mentioned it in several of his works.
