= Szklary, Gmina Jaśliska =

Szklary
- Village
- Location within Poland
- Coordinates: 49°28′18″N 21°48′19″E
- Country: Poland
- Voivodeship: Subcarpathian
- County: Krosno
- Gmina: Jaśliska
- Population: 170

Szklary [ˈʂklarɨ] is a village in the administrative district of Gmina Jaśliska, within Krosno County, Subcarpathian Voivodeship, in south-eastern Poland, close to the border with Slovakia.
