= Królik Polski =

- Village
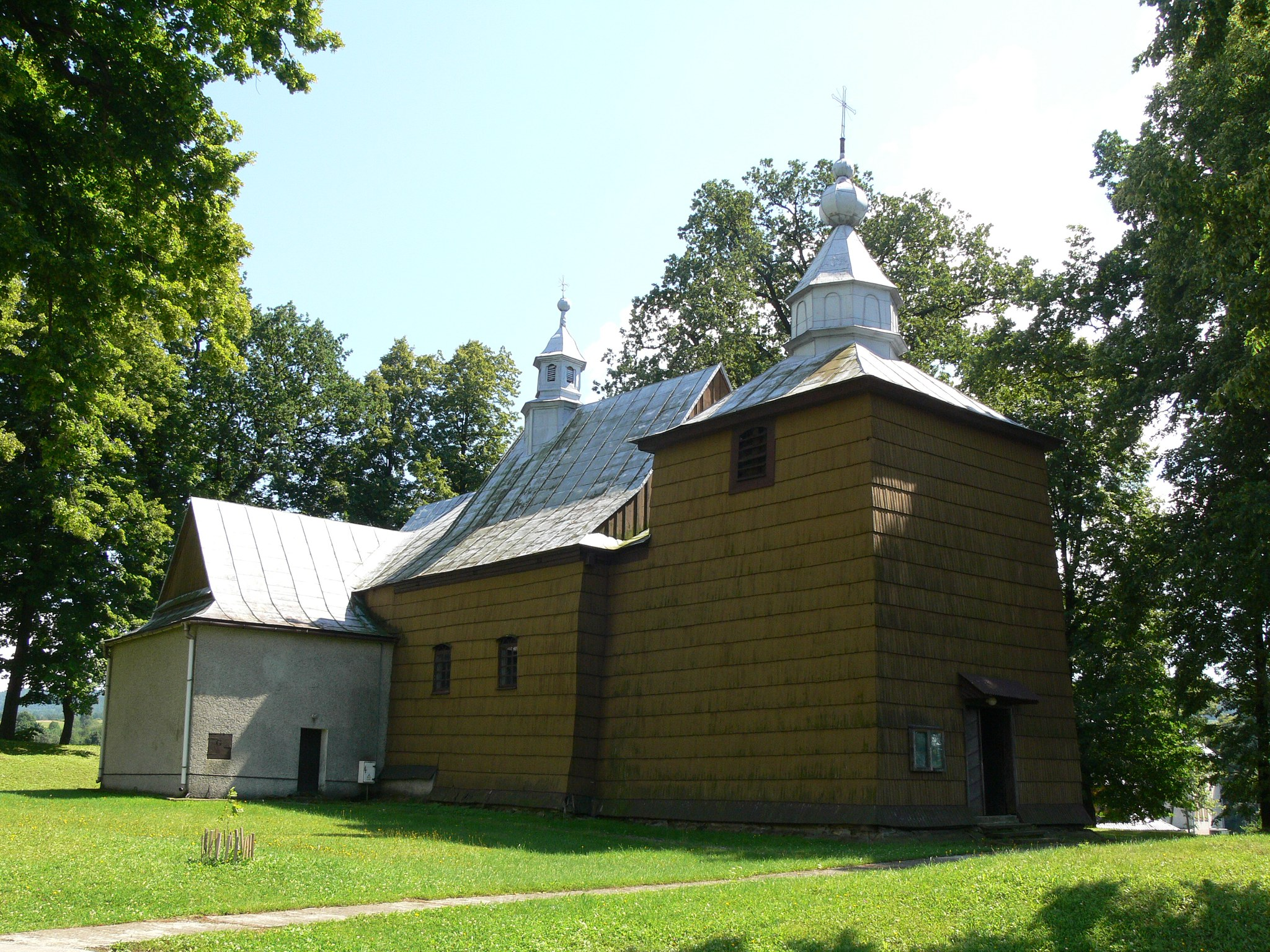
- Old church in Królik Polski

- Location within Poland
- Coordinates: 49°30′56″N 21°49′15″E
- Country: Poland
- Voivodeship: Subcarpathian
- County: Krosno
- Gmina: Rymanów
- Population (approx.): 770
- Website: www.krolikpolski.com

Królik Polski [ˈkrulʲik ˈpɔlskʲi] is a village in the administrative district of Gmina Rymanów, within Krosno County, Subcarpathian Voivodeship, in south-eastern Poland.
