= Maszkowice, Lesser Poland Voivodeship =

Maszkowice
- Village
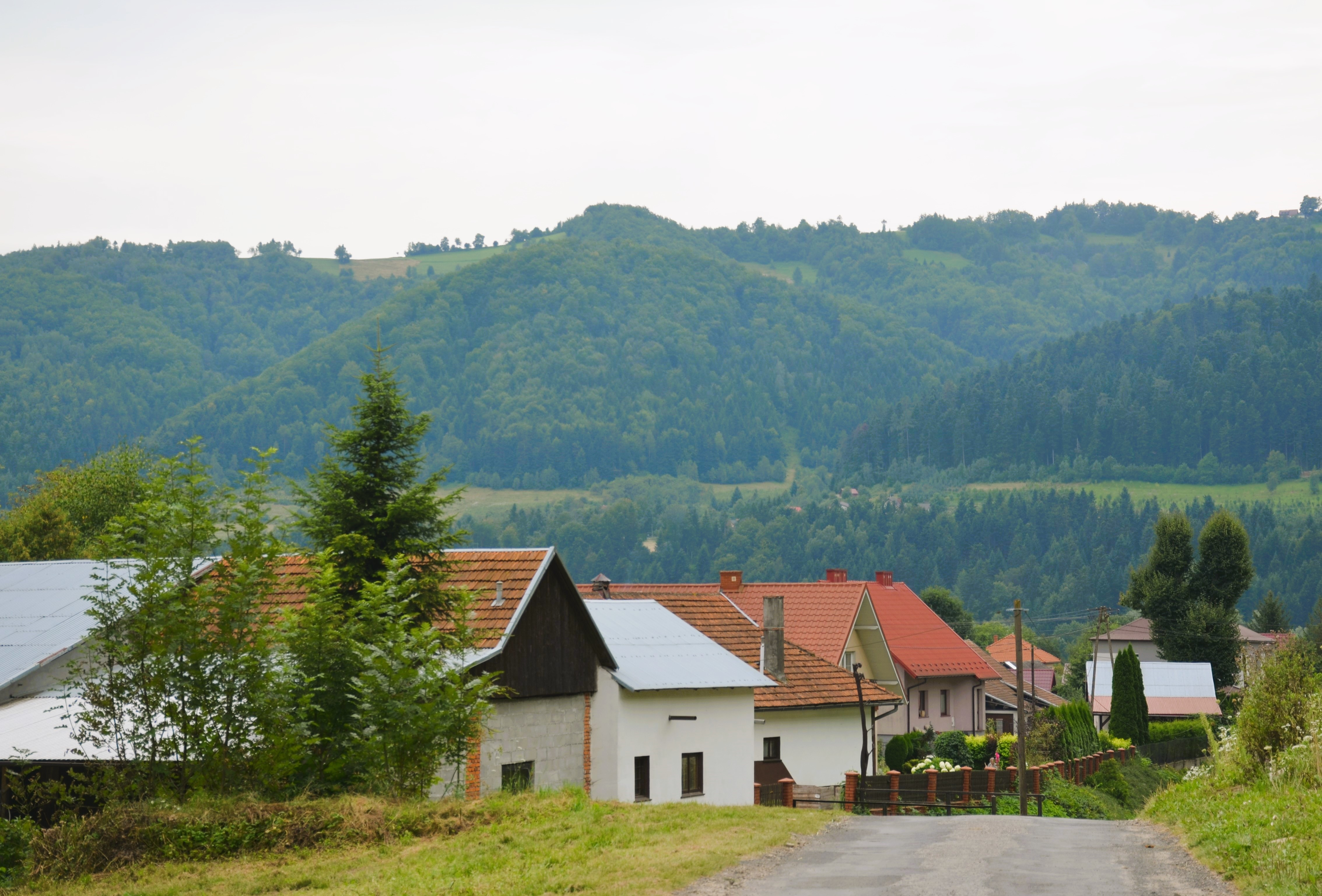

- Location within Poland
- Coordinates: 49°32′59″N 20°27′49″E
- Country: Poland
- Voivodeship: Lesser Poland
- County: Nowy Sącz
- Gmina: Łącko

Maszkowice [maʂkɔˈvʲit͡sɛ] is a village in the administrative district of Gmina Łącko, within Nowy Sącz County, Lesser Poland Voivodeship, in southern Poland.

The archaeological site Zyndram's Hill is located in Maszkowice.
