= Czeremcha, Podkarpackie Voivodeship =

Czeremcha
- Village
- Location within Poland
- Coordinates: 49°24′N 21°47′E
- Country: Poland
- Voivodeship: Subcarpathian
- County: Krosno
- Gmina: Jaśliska

Czeremcha [t͡ʂɛˈrɛmxa] is a village in the administrative district of Gmina Jaśliska, within Krosno County, Subcarpathian Voivodeship, in south-eastern Poland, close to the border with Slovakia.
