= Lubatowa =

- Village
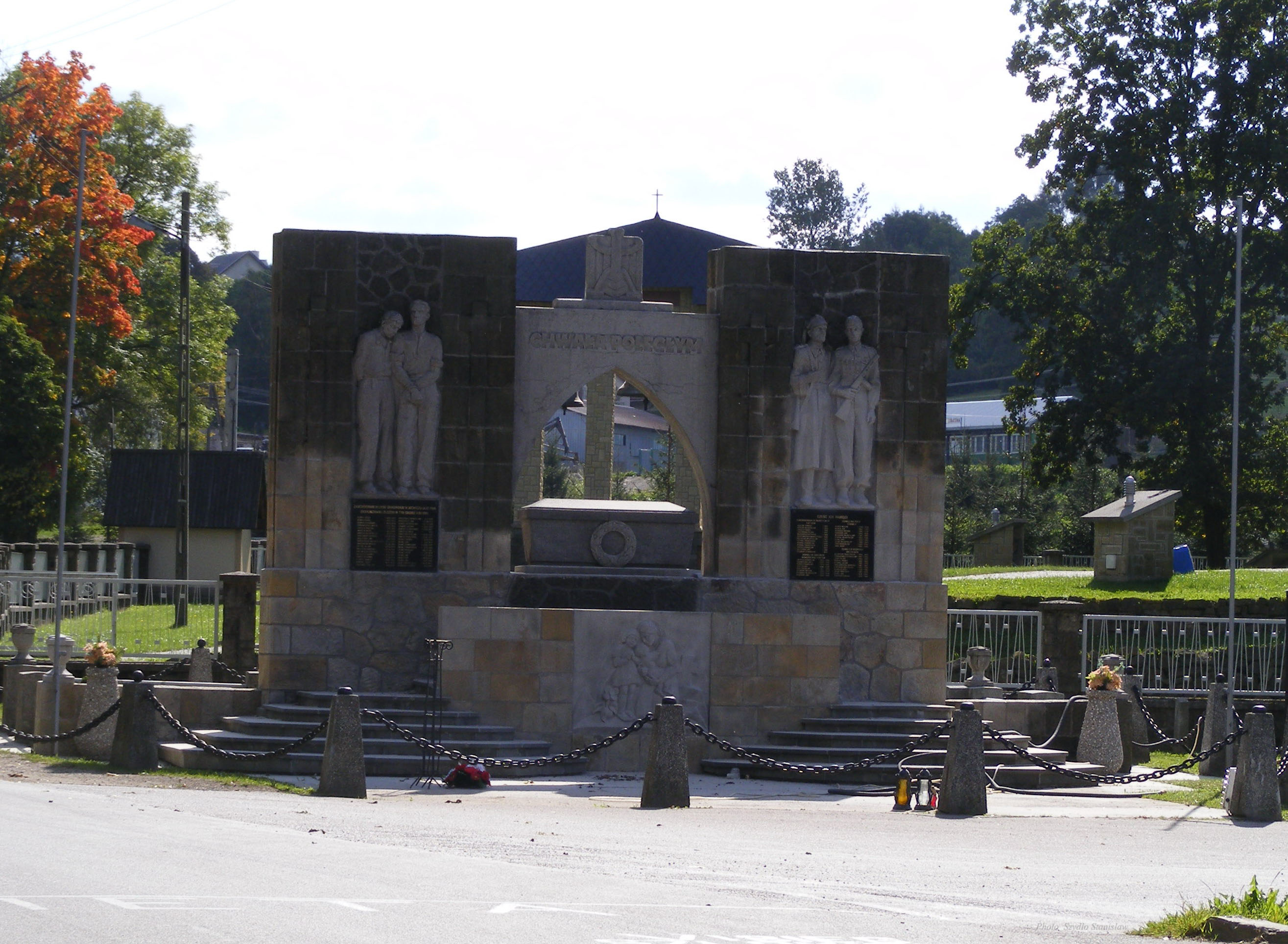
- Memorial to the people murdered in 1944 by SS Galizien

- Location within Poland
- Coordinates: 49°32′57″N 21°45′31″E
- Country: Poland
- Voivodeship: Subcarpathian
- County: Krosno
- Gmina: Iwonicz-Zdrój
- Population: 3,700
- Website: http://lubatowa.ocom.pl

Lubatowa [lubaˈtɔva] is a village in the administrative district of Gmina Iwonicz-Zdrój, within Krosno County, Subcarpathian Voivodeship, in south-eastern Poland.

The Olympian Czesław Zając was born here.
