= Wróblik =

Wróblik may refer to:

- Wróblik, Warmian-Masurian Voivodeship
- Wróblik Królewski
- Wróblik Szlachecki
