= Jakub of Sienno =

Medieval Bishop of Kraków (1413–1480)

His Excellency Jakub of Sienno
- Archbishop of Gniezno; Primate of Poland
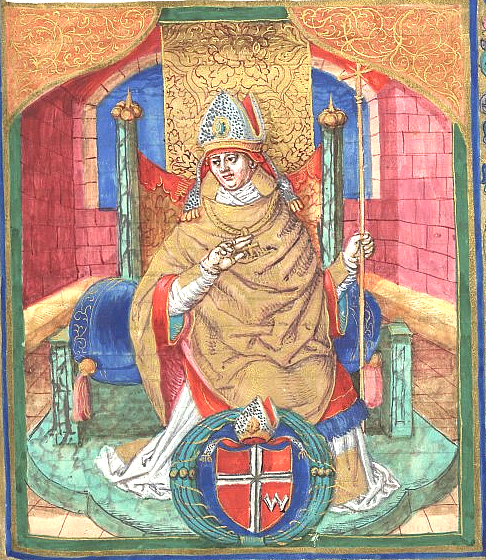
- Church: Roman Catholic
- Archdiocese: Gniezno
- Diocese: Gniezno
- Installed: 1473
- Term ended: 1480

Personal details
- Born: 1413 Sienno
- Died: 4 October 1480 (aged 66–67) Łowicz
- Coat of arms

Jakub of Sienno (Polish: Jakub z Sienna; 1413–1480) was a medieval Bishop of Kraków in the years 1461–1463, Bishop of Włocławek from 1464, and then Archbishop of Gniezno from 1474. He was also a 15th-century diplomat for the Polish Crown.

== Early life ==
Jakob was born in 1413 in Sienno, the son of Dobisław of Oleśnicy a local aristocrat of the Debno family and his wife Catherine Oleśnicka, daughter of Dymitr of Goraj. His father, Dobiesława Olesnica mala Dębno, was Count of Sandomierz.

His brothers were:

- John of Sienna Castellan of Lwów
- Dymitr of Sienna (d. 1465) Canon of Kraków
- Nicholas of Sienna (d. 1484) Archdeacon of Sandomierz
- Paul of Sienna (c. 1410–1444) the Royal Secretary
- Andrzej Sienieński (d. 1494) Chamberlain of Sandomierz
- He was also a nephew of Cardinal Oleśnicki.

He studied law and Theology in Rome and from 1435 was a Canon of Kraków Cathedral.

== Diplomatic career ==
As a diplomat he served as Secretary of King Władysław III of Poland and King Casimir IV Jagiellon. He was sent on missions to Hungary in 1442 and 1448 and in 1459 he represented the King at the Congress of Mantua.

== Episcopal career ==
After the death of his uncle, Cardinal Zbigniew Oleśnicki, in 1455 he was administrator of the diocese of Kraków.

Pope Pius II appointed him Bishop of Kraków. Unfortunately, the King had other plans and request the appointment of John Gruszczynski, consecrated on May 31, 1461. The conflict escalated with the Pope (Pius II) on 2 June 1461, threatening to excommunicate the King. The King then banished Jakub.

1842 engraving by e. Raczyński depicting the tombstone of Jakob in the Basilica of Prymasowskiej in Gniezno.

Eventually on 16 January 1462 the conflict was resolved through intersession of the papal legate Jerome Lando, Archbishop of Crete. In January 1463 at the Sejm in Piotrków the Kings appointee abdicated the bishopric of Kraków.

Pope Pius II compensated Jakob and he received the bishopric of Włocławek. In Włocławek and in Gniezno he installed oak pew stalls and rich liturgical equipment, and donated to the library of Kraków Academy.

In 1465 he represented the King at the meeting with the Teutonic Knights in Toruń, that ended the Thirteen Years' War.

In 1466 he represented the King during the discussions with the Teutonic Knights in Toruń, ending the 13-year-old war. He was a signatory to the Act of peace of 1466.

He died 4 October 1480 in Łowicz and was buried in the Cathedral of Gniezno, where he erected a cross above the chancel. The cross is still present to this day.
