= Sieniawa (disambiguation) =

Sieniawa may refer to the following places:

- Sieniawa, Lesser Poland Voivodeship (south Poland)
- Sieniawa in Subcarpathian Voivodeship (south-east Poland)
- Sieniawa, Gmina Rymanów, Krosno County in Subcarpathian Voivodeship (south-east Poland)
- Sieniawa, Lubusz Voivodeship (west Poland)
- Sieniawa, West Pomeranian Voivodeship (north-west Poland)
