= Izabella Zielińska =

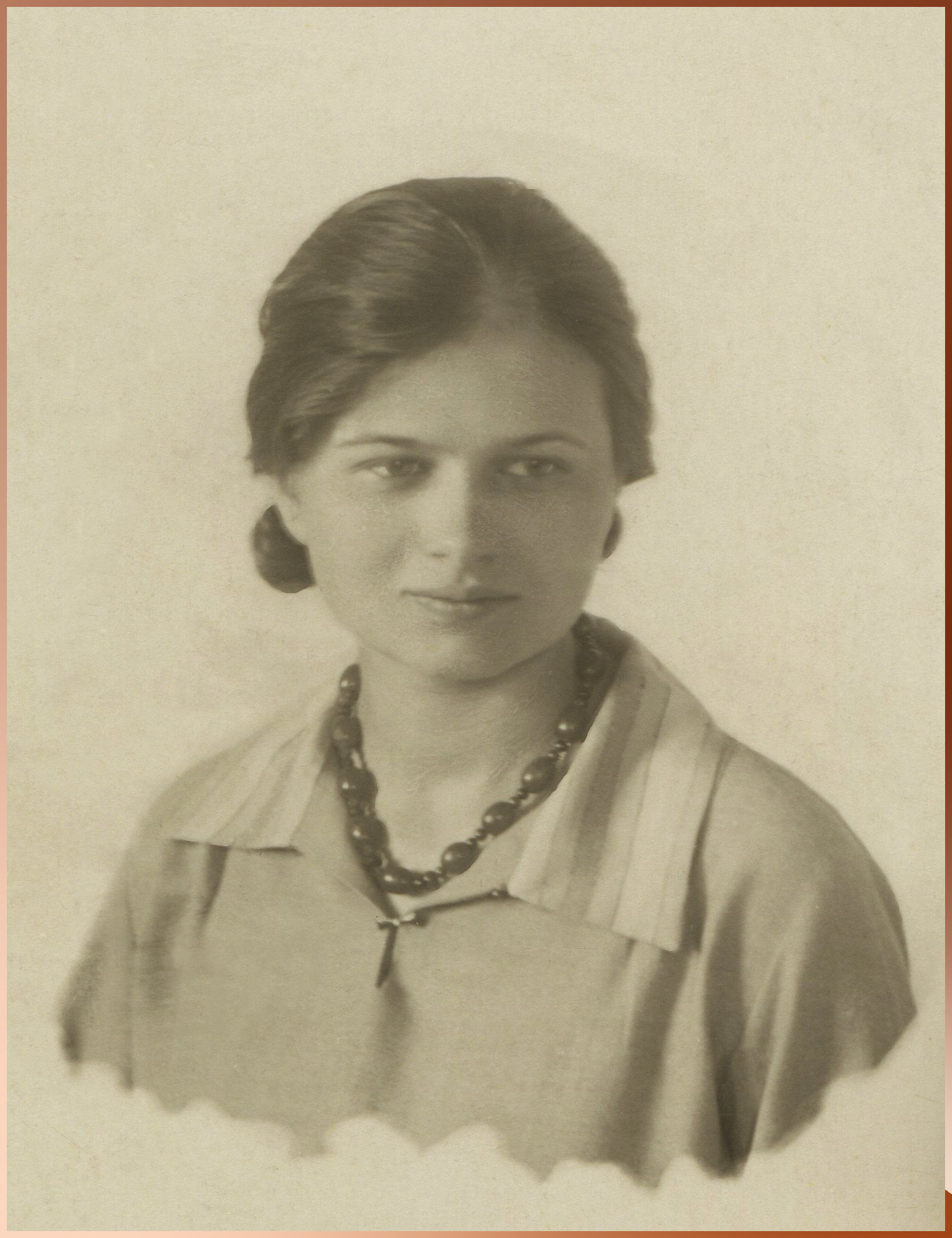
- Izabella Zielińska

Background information
- Born: Izabella Jadwiga Ostaszewska; December 10, 1910; Klimkówka, Austria-Hungary (present-day Klimkówka, Republic of Poland)
- Died: November 20, 2017 (aged 106) Kościan, Poland
- Genres: Classical Music
- Occupation: Pianist
- Instrument: Piano

Izabella Jadwiga Zielińska (née Ostaszewska; 10 December 1910 – 20 November 2017) was a Polish pianist and pedagogue with one of the longest artistic biographies in Poland, starting back in 1935.

== Life ==
Izabella Jadwiga Ostaszewska was born in Klimkówka, Podkarpackie Voivodeship and attended primary school in Sanok and at the Lyceum of the Ursuline Convent in Lviv, graduating in 1929. She took piano lessons from Klaudia Rylska. In 1930 she went to Belgium to continue her education in the Ursulines Institute at Wavre-Notre-Dame, where she studied French and music.

In 1931 she passed her music examination with a gold medal before the panel of the Royal Conservatoire of Antwerp and the Royal Conservatory of Brussels. She returned to Lviv for further piano study with Professor Bronisław Poźniak, and followed him when he moved to the city of Breslau. From 1935 onwards she performed in public under the name Iza Ostoia. Her concerts included compositions of Bach, Beethoven, Chopin, Szymanowski, Paderewski. Having completed her studies with Poźniak in Breslau in the summer of 1939, she had returned home to Klimklówka in Poland just weeks before the German invasion of Poland and the outbreak of the War in 1939.

In 1942 she married Bogdan Zieliński and moved to Kościan, on the Polish territories incorporated directly to the Nazi Germany, in 1939. There the Nazis enforced a clampdown on all Polish culture. Zielińska was forbidden from pursuing music and was forced into physical labour. Despite her ban, she had managed to teach some music in secret. After the War she resumed her concert career giving piano recitals and continued as a piano teacher. With five children to bring up, however, her concert career effectively had to take a back seat. She concentrated on her teaching, in which she became increasingly involved. She was a descendant of the Polish composer Michał Kleofas Ogiński and mother-in-law of the contemporary composer Lidia Zielińska. In 2016 she celebrated her 106th birthday. Zielińska died on 20 November 2017, at age 106.

She was closely related to Jerzy Pajączkowski-Dydyński, a Polish officer, who died aged 111.

== Awards ==
- Gold Cross of Merit
- Silver Medal for Merit to Culture – Gloria Artis
