= Pajaczkowski =

Pajaczkowski is a Polish surname. Notable people with the surname include:

- Jerzy Pajączkowski-Dydyński (1894–2005), Polish army officer
- Tony Pajaczkowski (1936–2022), Canadian football player
