= Jan Nepomucen Potocki =

- Count
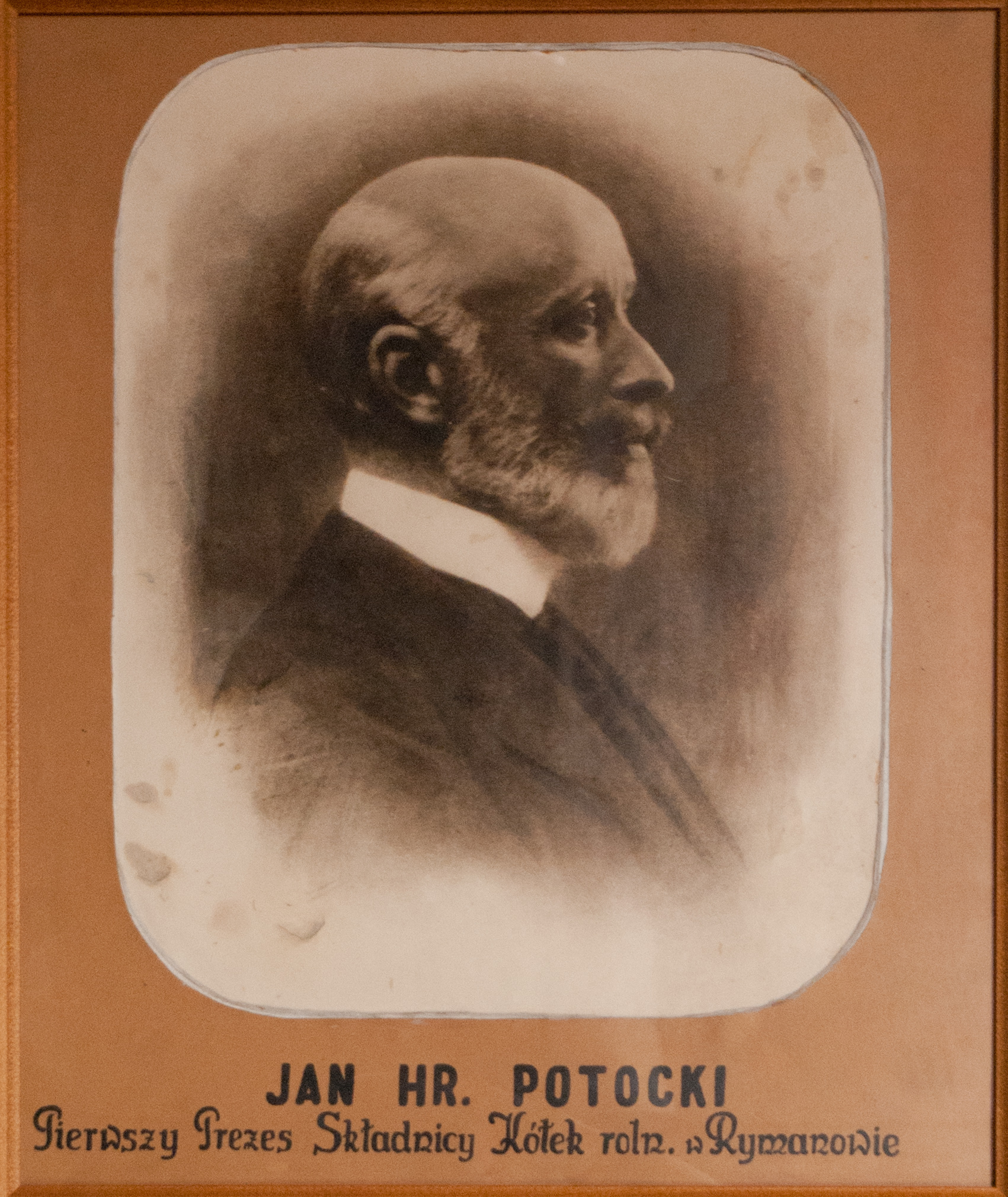
- Coat of arms: Piława
- Born: 29 April 1867; Oleszyce
- Died: 13 March 1943 (aged 75); Rymanów-Zdrój
- Family: Potocki
- Consort: Róża Maria Wodzicka; Maria Szajer
- Issue: with Róża Maria Wodzicka; Jan Potocki; Teresa Potocka; Aleksander Klemens Potocki; Jadwiga Maria Potocka with Maria Szajer; Ignacy Potocki; Zofia Maria Potocka; Maria Potocka; Jan Władysław Potocki
- Father: Stanisław Antoni Potocki
- Mother: Anna Zofia Dzialynska

Count Jan Nepomucen Potocki (1867–1943) was a Polish nobleman (szlachcic) and social activist who served as a member of the Imperial Council and the Sejm of Galicia. Jan was owner of Rymanów Zdrój estates. He was married to Róża Maria Wodzicka on 30 June 1892 in Kraków, and to Maria Szajer on 14 October 1905 in Przemyśl.

== Career ==
During the IX term (1897–1900) of the Imperial Council, following the death of Deputy Józef Wiktor, he was elected to replace him on June 7, 1899. In December 1900, he was elected as a deputy from the IV rural constituency to the X term (1901–1907) of the Imperial Council. In 1913, he was elected as a deputy from the IV rural constituency of Sanok to the National Sejm of Galicia for its last (one-year) X term (1913–1914). From 1903, he was a member of the c.k. (Austro-Hungarian) Sanok County Council, elected from the larger estates group, serving as a deputy member of the district council. Re-elected in 1907, he continued to serve as a deputy member of the district council. In the 1912 elections, he was re-elected from the rural communes group. Initially, he lost the election for the position of president (marshal) of the district council to Kazimierz Laskowski, but around 1913, he assumed this position.

He was a member of the Sanok-Lesko-Krosno branch of the Imperial and Royal Economic Society of Lviv. On November 23, 1905, he was elected chairman of the county board in Sanok of the Society of Agricultural Circles, headquartered in Lviv. As of early 1906, he owned four manor estates in the Sanok district. In 1911, he was the registered owner of the estates Posada Górna (266 hectares), Wólka (91 hectares), and Wołtuszowa (489 hectares). By 1914, he was the president of the National Union of Spas and Health Resorts in Lviv, serving as the president of the tourism section and the second vice president of the Galician Credit Institution. He also served as president of the Sanok branch of the Polish Tatra Society, founded in 1929. In the 1920s, he was a member of the council of the Municipal Savings Bank in Sanok. On January 10, 1931, he was appointed vice president of the board of the Subcarpathian Union, which united oil industry entrepreneurs. Until 1934, he was a board member of the Sanok branch of the Polish Red Cross.

He was the initiator of road construction in the region in the 1930s. To this end, he created the so-called "labor holiday" - an idea according to which people voluntarily dedicated at least one day a year to social work to carry out an important infrastructure project in the vicinity of their place of residence (roads, community centers, chapels, bridges, footbridges, etc. were built in this way). Several sections of roads were opened during the Mountain Rally in Sanok in August 1936. He donated building materials for the construction of schools, fire stations, and bridges.

The writer Kalman Segal, in his novel "Beyond the Strange River Sambation", written in 1955 and published in 1957, included references to Jan Nepomucen Potocki and his initiative of a "labor holiday".

== Awards and honors ==
- Officer's Cross of the Order of Polonia Restituta (9 November 1931)
