= Głębokie, Podkarpackie Voivodeship =

Głębokie
- Village
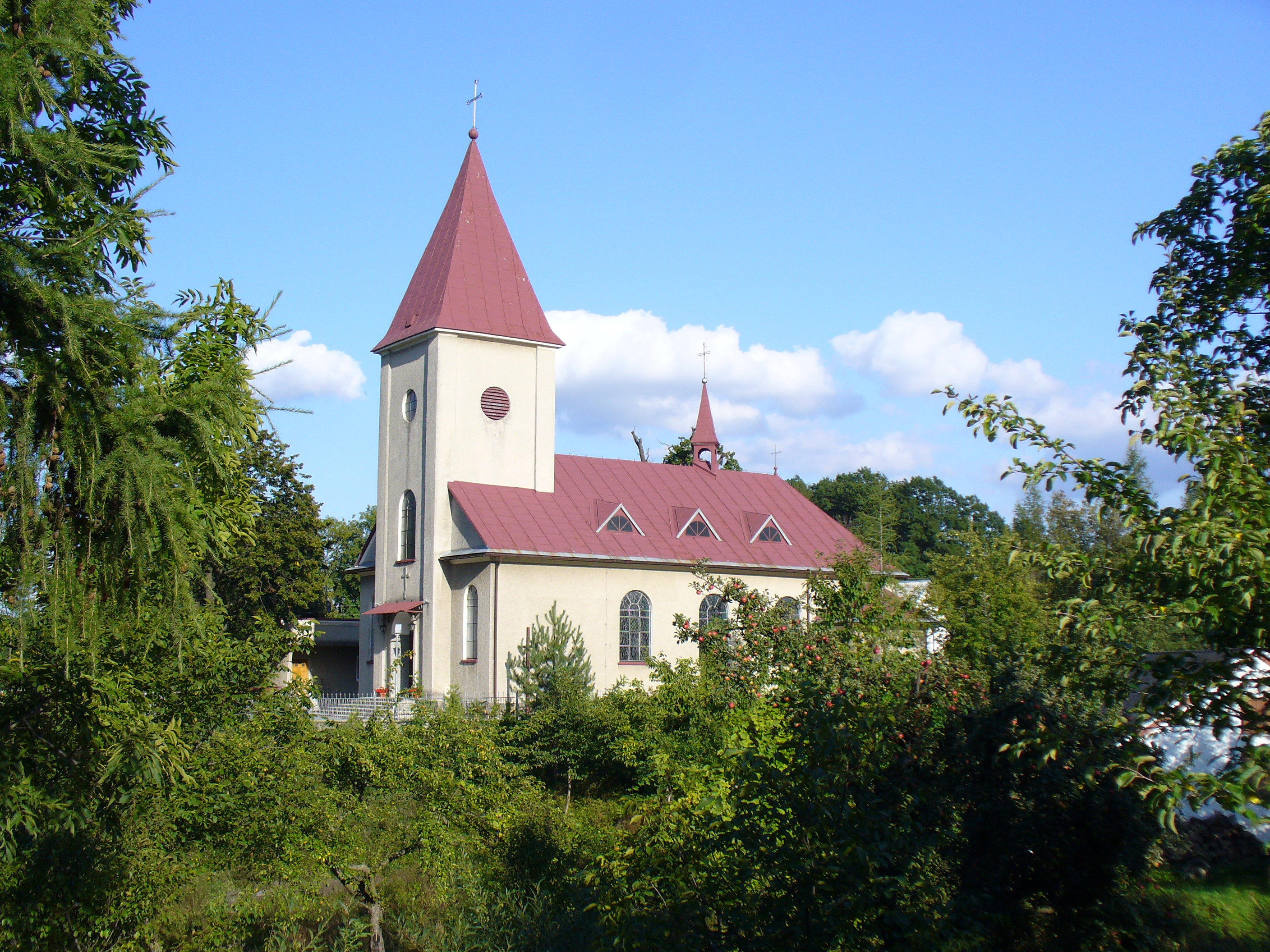
- Church

- Location within Poland
- Coordinates: 49°33′N 21°55′E
- Country: Poland
- Voivodeship: Subcarpathian
- County: Krosno
- Gmina: Rymanów

Głębokie [ɡwɛmˈbɔkʲɛ] is a village in the administrative district of Gmina Rymanów, within Krosno County, Subcarpathian Voivodeship, in south-eastern Poland.

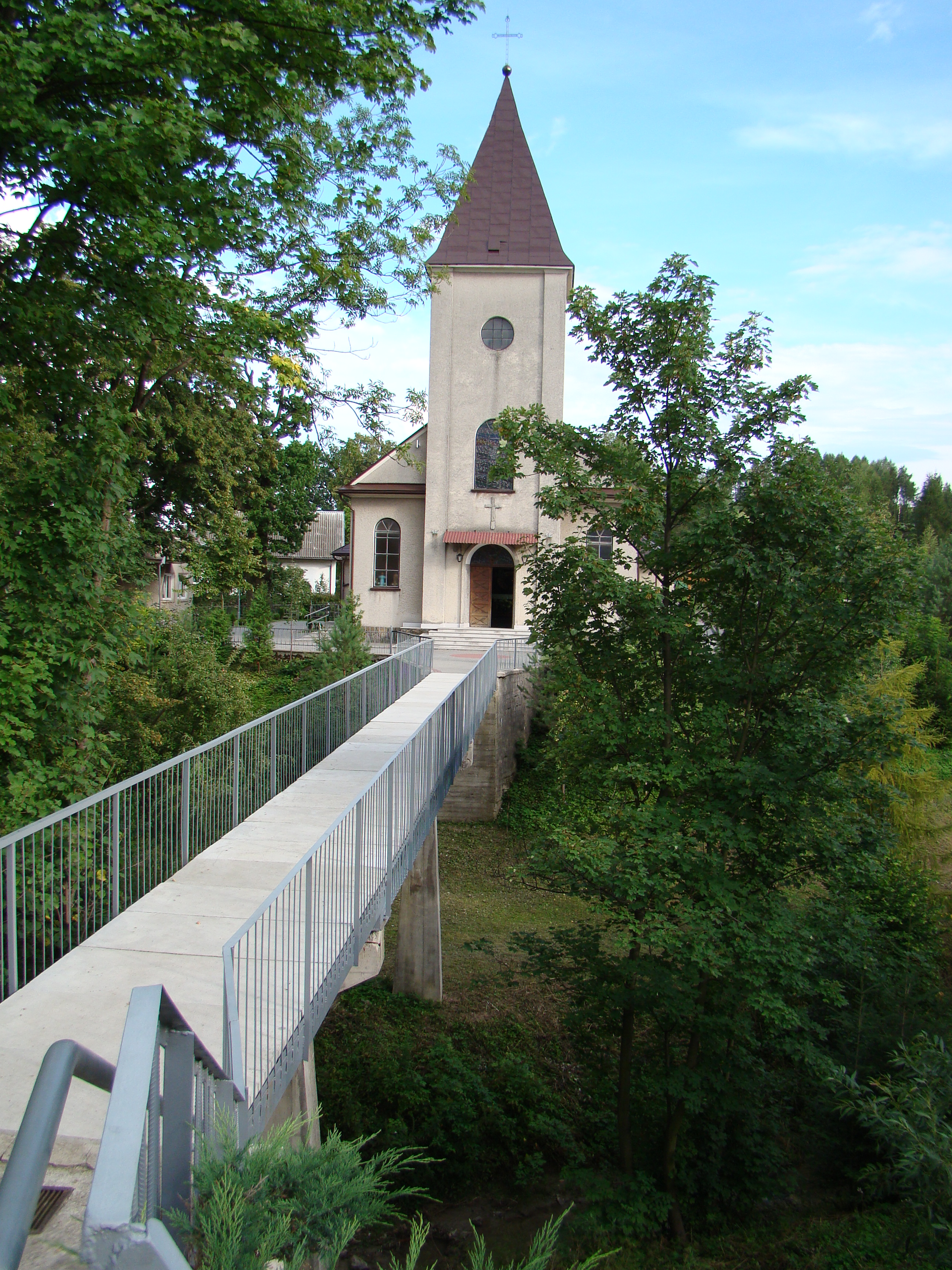
Głębokie church

== Geography ==
Głębokie stretches on both sides of the Valley of the Głębokiego Creek, "a tributary in the upper reaches of the Wisłoka river. The village is located in The Sieniawsko-Rymanowskiej, which is part of the Jasielsko-Sanockie Pits gminas between the hills of the Carpathian hills and woodlands of the Beskid. The Highlands around the town rise to 407 metres above sea level, and to the Southeast up to 500 m above sea level, while from the Southwest 634 m above sea level, and from the West 423 m. The village is 4 km south of Krosno. It is bordered by the Rymanow Sieniawą and Rudawką Rymanowską. It is on the Wisłoku river.

== History ==
The origins of the village date back to the 15th century when, according to legend, King Władysław Jagiełło, stopped in Rymanów to stay with Dobiesława Oleśnicki a knight who had distinguished himself in the Battle of Grunwald. The meeting proceeded in a relaxed atmosphere at heavily filled table and memories of the battle of Grunwald. The King mentioned valour and watchful peasants-the Knights of Lithuania, who saved his life when he was attacked by the Teutonic Knights. The courage of the Lithuanian Knights so I was intrigued by Dobiesławas wife Catherine Dobiesława, that she asked the King that sent her 50 families of chivalry from Lithuania. A year later these settlers came from Lithuania and were settled in the village. The settlement was given the name of Głębokie meaning "Deep" named after the deep water in the river at that point.

Głębokie was invested in 1437 and until World War II, the village was an enclave of predominantly Polish population in inhabited mainly by people of Rusińską. The Act of Foundation of the village was released on 29 September 1437 in Rymanów by Dobiesława of Oleśnica.

The parish of Głębokie existed until 1670, when the local priest was killed, and the Bishop did not appoint a new pastor. The parish was restored only in 1932. At the time of the Protestant Reformation the local lord, Count John and Stanisław Janowscy converted to Lutheranism.

In 1863, Ferdinand Eligiusz Janowski built one of the first oil mines in Poland near głębockie in the Valley of the Silskiego Brook. This mine was operated until 1948, when oil extraction has become unprofitable. In 1905 the village was owned by Adolf Pozniak and had an area of less than 350 ha.

During the First World War, Russian and Cossack troops were stationed here and Paweł Hajduczek was mayor.

Later on December 13, 1942, the village was attacked by the German army in response to insurgency operations, 13 homes were burned. The partisans Jan Urbanik and Adam Golowski were hanged. Then on 15 September 1944 German troops blew up the Church, rectory and burned 50 homes and killed 21 people.
