= Ladzin =

- Village
- Location within Poland
- Coordinates: 49°36′8″N 21°51′50″E
- Country: Poland
- Voivodeship: Subcarpathian
- County: Krosno
- Gmina: Rymanów
- Population: 510

Ladzin [ˈlad͡ʑin] is a village in the administrative district of Gmina Rymanów, within Krosno County, Subcarpathian Voivodeship, in south-eastern Poland.
