= Wisłoczek =

- Village
- Location within Poland
- Coordinates: 49°31′N 21°53′E
- Country: Poland
- Voivodeship: Subcarpathian
- County: Krosno
- Gmina: Rymanów

Wisłoczek [vʲiˈswɔt͡ʂɛk] is a village in the administrative district of Gmina Rymanów, within Krosno County, Subcarpathian Voivodeship, in south-eastern Poland.
