= Bałucianka =

- Village
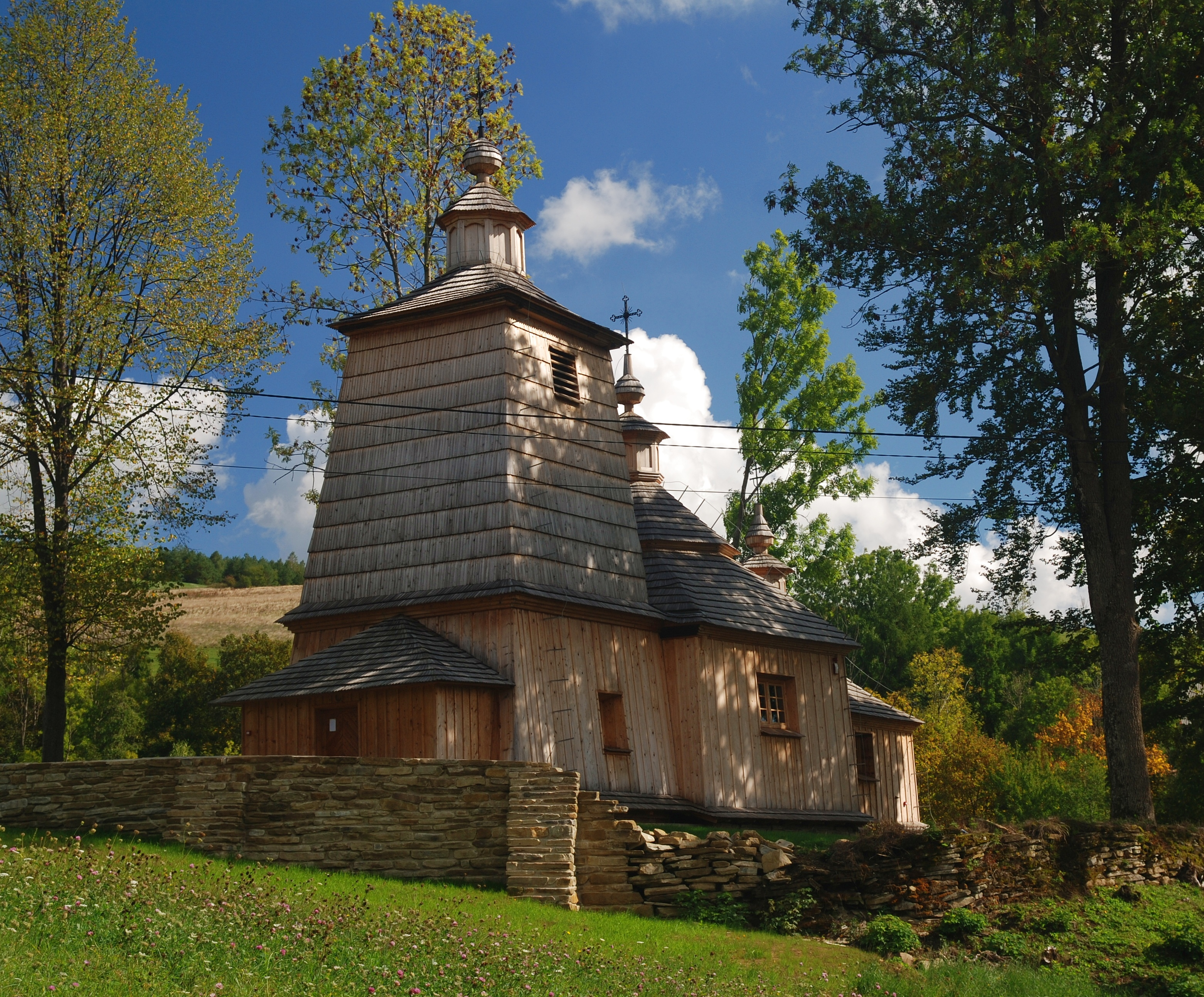
- Roman Catholic church, formerly Greek Catholic

- Location within Poland
- Coordinates: 49°32′N 21°48′E
- Country: Poland
- Voivodeship: Subcarpathian
- County: Krosno
- Gmina: Rymanów

Bałucianka [bawuˈt͡ɕaŋka] is a village in the administrative district of Gmina Rymanów, within Krosno County, Subcarpathian Voivodeship, in south-eastern Poland.
