= Milcza =

- Village
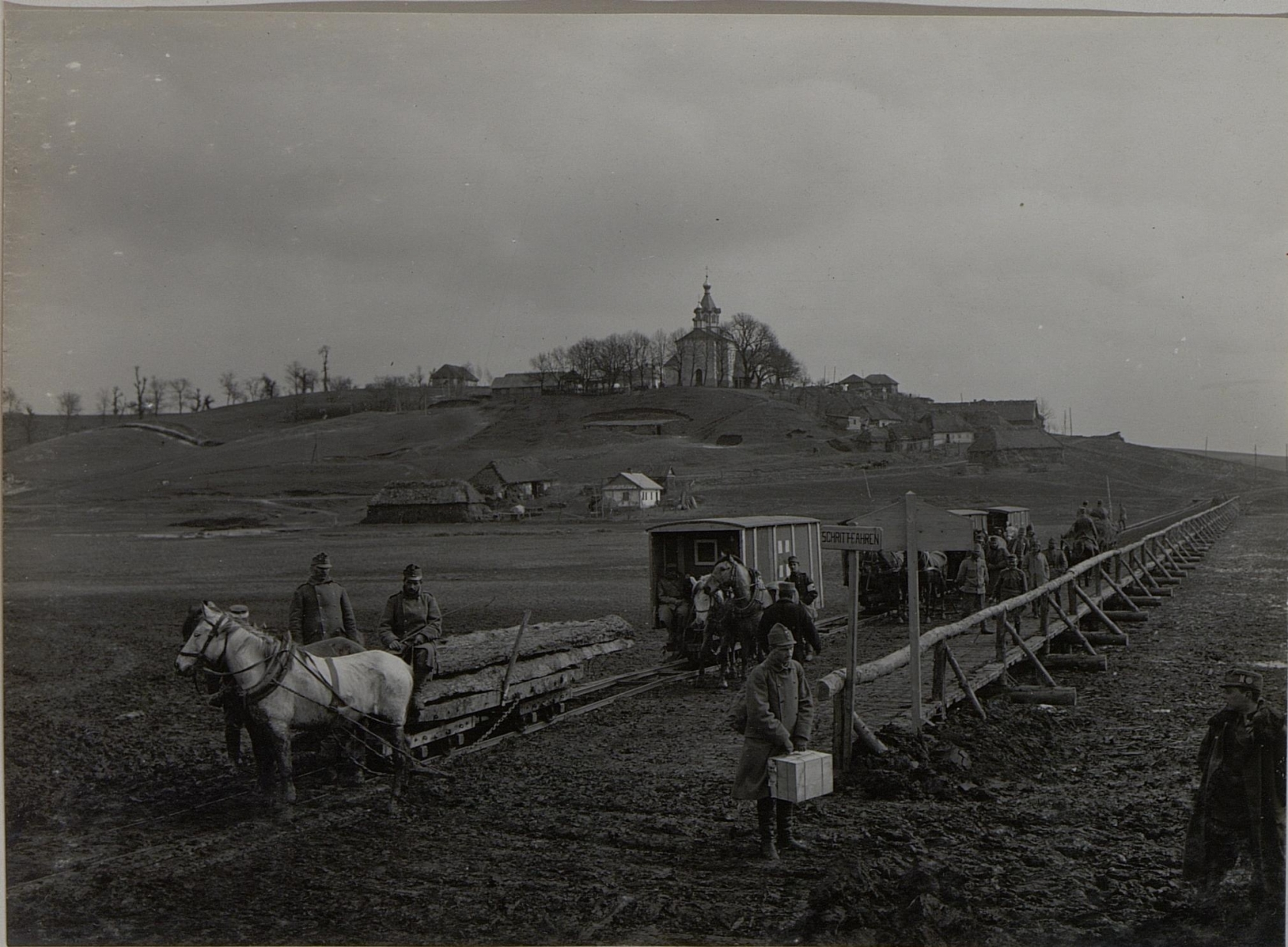
- Ambulance train near Milcza, ca. 1916

- Location within Poland
- Coordinates: 49°37′N 21°55′E
- Country: Poland
- Voivodeship: Subcarpathian
- County: Krosno
- Gmina: Rymanów
- Website: milcza.fm.interia.pl

Milcza [ˈmʲilt͡ʂa] is a village in the administrative district of Gmina Rymanów, within Krosno County, Subcarpathian Voivodeship, in south-eastern Poland.
