= Jan of Sienno =

Coat of Arms Dębno of Polish noble families
- Country: Poland

Jan z Sienna, also known as John of Chotcza, was a 15th-century Polish noble, and soldier.

== Family ==
Born in Sienno, he was the son of Dobisław z Oleśnicy and Katarzyna Oleśnicka, daughter of Dmitry of Goraj. Cardinal Zbigniew Oleśnicki was his uncle. He had ten brothers and sisters, among them Jacob, who was Bishop of Kraków and then Archbishop of Gniezno and Primate of Poland. He left five sons, Dobiesława, Sigmund, Paul, Peter, and John.

== Career ==
He was Przemysl Chamberlain, Starost of Sandomierz, Castellan of Lwów from 1459 to 1460, and Voivode of Ruthenia.

John or Jan distinguished himself fighting under Władysław II Jagiełło against the Grand Master of the Teutonic Order, Świdrygiełłą and he received Świdrygielles Castle as a reward.

He was also the founder of the town Zolochiv(originally "Złoczów", meaning Golden) in 1442 which is now in Ukraine. His family became one of the leading families in the South-Eastern border region of the Polish–Lithuanian Commonwealth.

He died sometime before the year 1477.

== See also ==
Jan z Sienna h. Dębno Geni.com
