= Łazy, Gmina Rymanów =

Łazy
- Village
- Location within Poland
- Coordinates: 49°35′N 21°54′E
- Country: Poland
- Voivodeship: Subcarpathian
- County: Krosno
- Gmina: Rymanów

Łazy [ˈwazɨ] is a village in the administrative district of Gmina Rymanów, within Krosno County, Subcarpathian Voivodeship, in south-eastern Poland.
