= Bzianka, Gmina Rymanów =

Bzianka
- Village
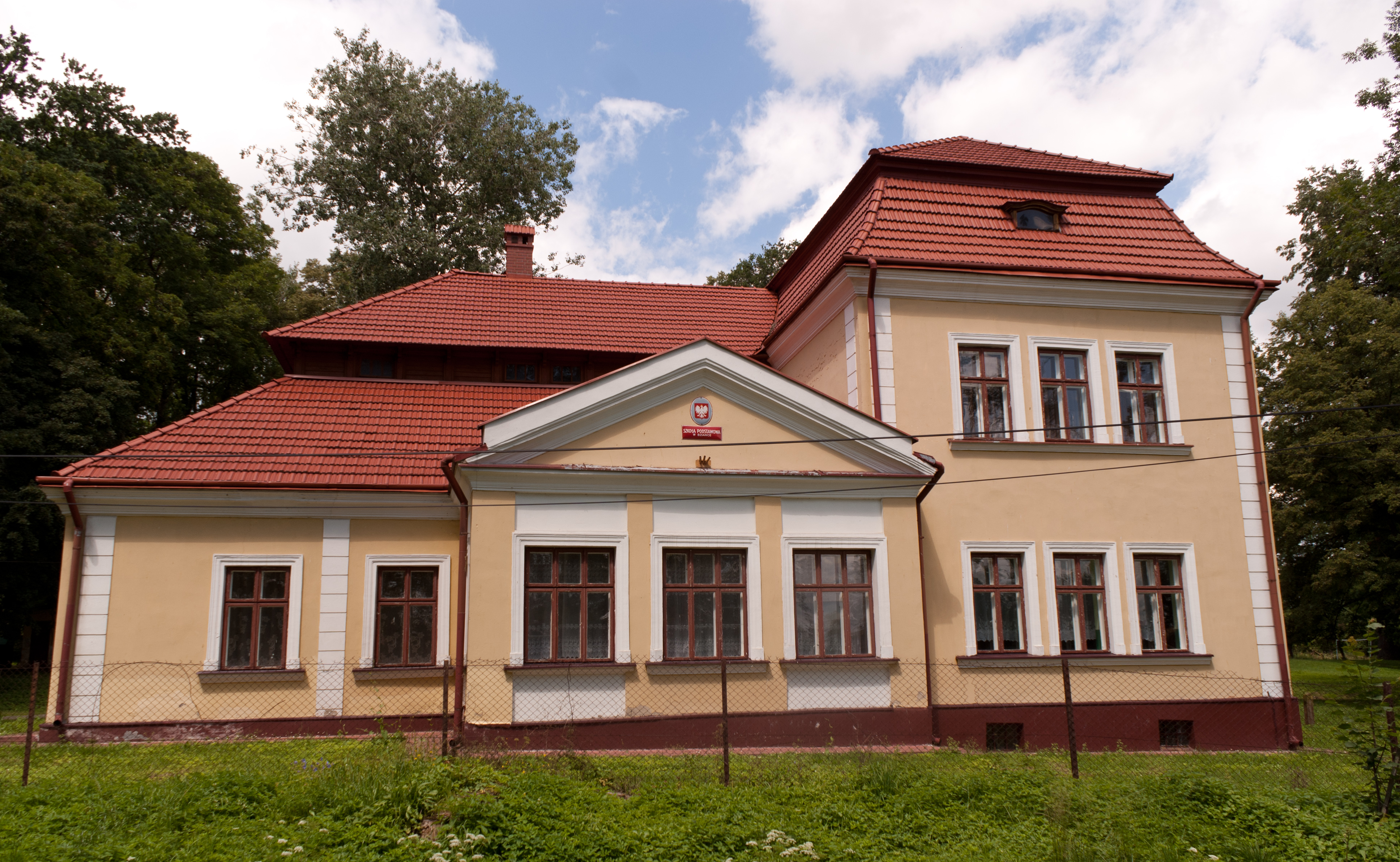
- Elementary school

- Location within Poland
- Coordinates: 49°38′N 21°56′E
- Country: Poland
- Voivodeship: Subcarpathian
- County: Krosno
- Gmina: Rymanów

Bzianka [ˈbʑaŋka] is a village in the administrative district of Gmina Rymanów, within Krosno County, Subcarpathian Voivodeship, in south-eastern Poland.
