= Zmysłówka, Gmina Rymanów =

Zmysłówka
- Village
- Location within Poland
- Coordinates: 49°36′10″N 21°54′02″E
- Country: Poland
- Voivodeship: Subcarpathian
- County: Krosno
- Gmina: Rymanów

Zmysłówka [zmɨˈswufka] is a village in the administrative district of Gmina Rymanów, within Krosno County, Subcarpathian Voivodeship, in south-eastern Poland.
