= Stanisław Antoni Potocki =

Polish noble (1837–1884)

- Count
- Coat of arms: Piława
- Born: 5 May 1837
- Died: 21 January 1884 (aged 46)
- Noble family: Potocki
- Consort: Anna Zofia Działyńska
- Father: Przemyslaw Potocki
- Mother: Teresa Sapieha

Count Stanisław Antoni Potocki (Polish pronunciation: [pɔˈtɔt͡skʲi], 1837–1884) was a Polish nobleman (szlachcic) and landowner.

Stanisław was owner of Rymanów-Zdrój and Olszyce estates. In 1876, a mineral water spring was discovered on the Rymanów estate, leading to the development of the Rymanów-Zdrój spa. He married Anna Zofia Działyńska on 6 February 1866 in Kórnik. They had several children together: Jan Nepomucen Potocki, Józef Marian Potocki, Piotr Potocki, Piotr II Potocki, Maria Potocka, Paweł Potocki, Cecylia Maria Potocka, Dominik Potocki and Antoni Tytus Potocki.
