= Gmina Rymanów =

Gmina Rymanów Rymanów Commune
- Gmina
- Coat of arms
- Interactive map of Gmina Rymanów
- Coordinates (Rymanów): 49°34′N 21°53′E
- Country: Poland
- Voivodeship: Subcarpathian
- County: Krosno County
- Seat: Rymanów

Area
  - Total: 165 km^{2} (64 sq mi)

Population (2006)
  - Total: 15,437
  - Density: 93.6/km^{2} (242/sq mi)
  - Urban: 3,564
  - Rural: 11,873
- Website: http://www.rymanow.pl/

Gmina Rymanów is an urban-rural gmina (administrative district) in Krosno County, Subcarpathian Voivodeship, in south-eastern Poland. Its seat is the town of Rymanów, which lies approximately 17 kilometres (11 mi) south-east of Krosno and 53 km (33 mi) south of the regional capital Rzeszów.

The gmina covers an area of 165.79 square kilometres (64.0 sq mi), and as of 2006 its total population is 15,437 (out of which the population of Rymanów amounts to 3,564, and the population of the rural part of the gmina is 11,873).

== Villages ==
Apart from the town of Rymanów, Gmina Rymanów contains the villages and settlements of Bałucianka, Bzianka, Głębokie, Klimkówka, Królik Polski, Ladzin, Łazy, Milcza, Posada Górna, Puławy, Rudawka Rymanowska, Rymanów-Zdrój, Sieniawa, Wisłoczek, Wróblik Królewski, Wróblik Szlachecki and Zmysłówka.

== Neighbouring gminas ==
Gmina Rymanów is bordered by the gminas of Besko, Bukowsko, Dukla, Haczów, Iwonicz-Zdrój, Jaśliska, Komańcza, Miejsce Piastowe and Zarszyn.
