= Sieniawa, Gmina Rymanów =

Sieniawa
- Village
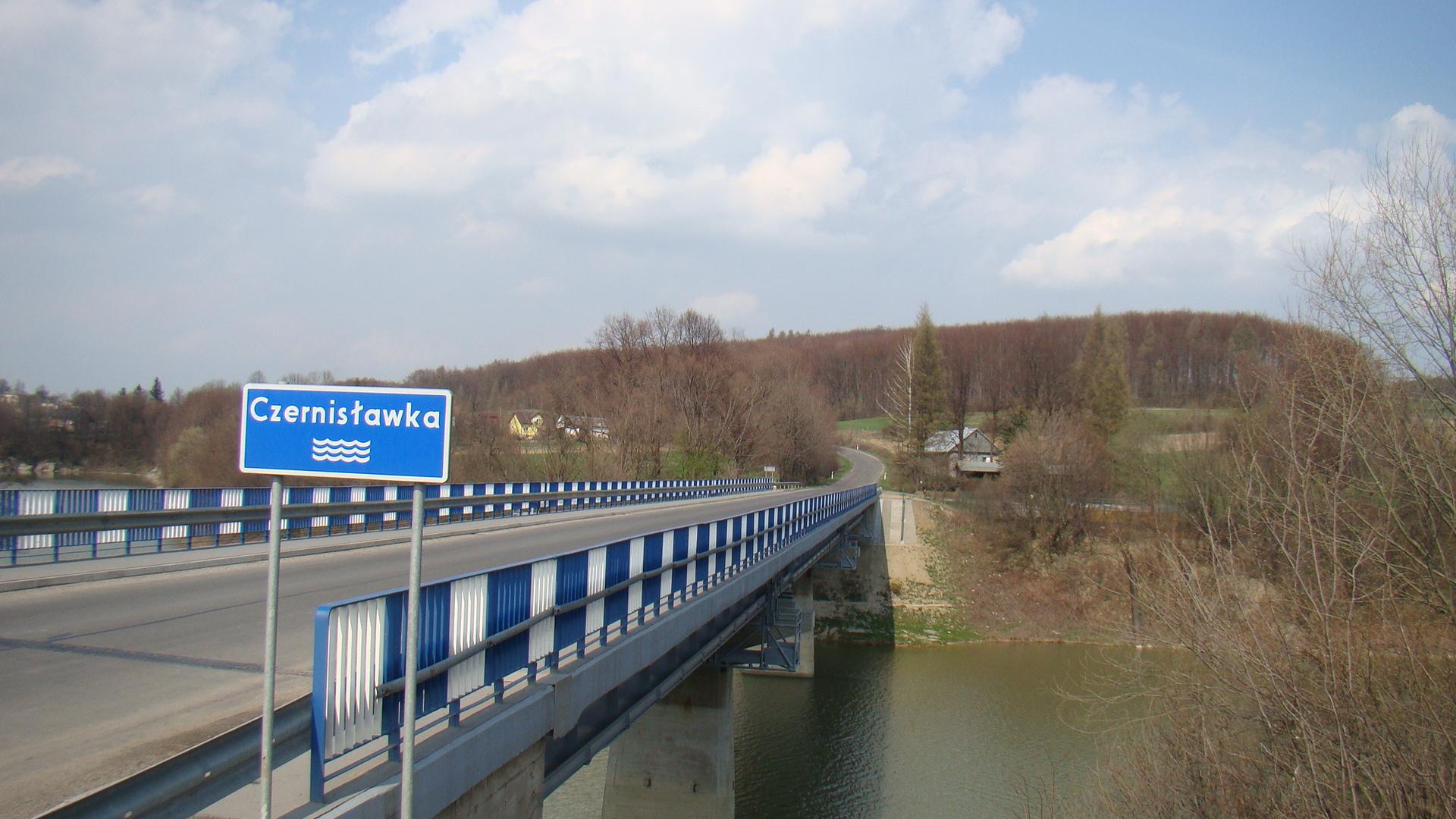

- Location within Poland
- Coordinates: 49°33′18″N 21°55′35″E
- Country: Poland
- Province: Podkarpackie
- County: Krosno
- Gmina: Rymanów
- Population (approx.): 1,000

Sieniawa (Polish: [ɕɛˈɲava]) is a village in the administrative district of Gmina Rymanów, within Krosno County, Podkarpackie Province, in south-eastern Poland.
