= Wróblik Szlachecki =

- Village
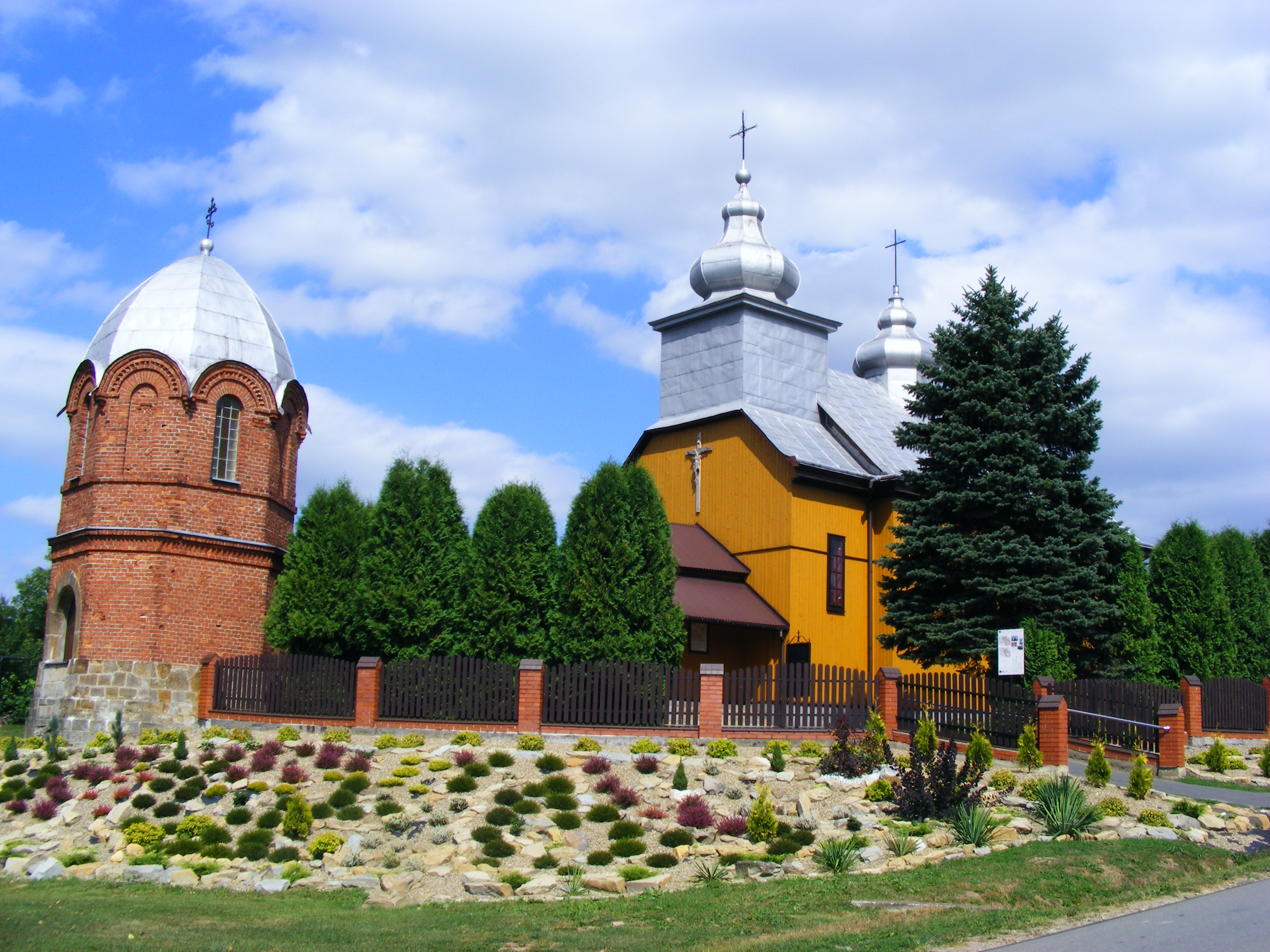
- Church of the Dormition in Wróblik Szlachecki

- Location within Poland
- Coordinates: 49°37′N 21°53′E
- Country: Poland
- Voivodeship: Subcarpathian
- County: Krosno
- Gmina: Rymanów

Population
  - Total: 970
- Time zone: UTC+1 (CET)
  - Summer (DST): UTC+2 (CEST)
- Vehicle registration: RKR

Wróblik Szlachecki [ˈvrublʲik ʂlaˈxɛt͡skʲi] is a village in the administrative district of Gmina Rymanów, within Krosno County, Subcarpathian Voivodeship, in south-eastern Poland.

Four Polish citizens were murdered by Nazi Germany in the village during World War II.
