= Klimkówka, Podkarpackie Voivodeship =

Klimkówka
- Village
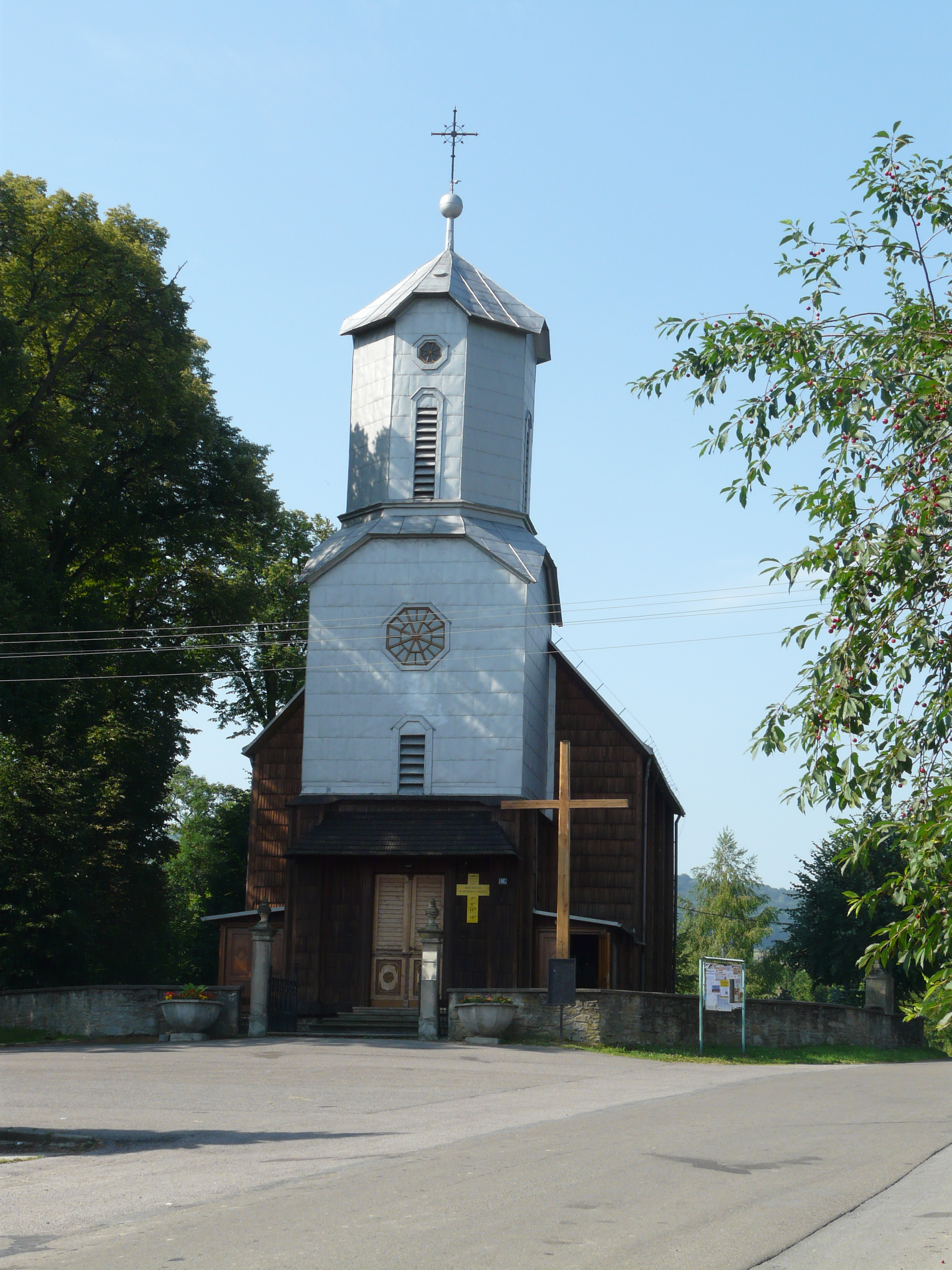
- Saint Archangel Michael Church

- Location within Poland
- Coordinates: 49°35′15″N 21°49′50″E
- Country: Poland
- Voivodeship: Subcarpathian
- County: Krosno
- Gmina: Rymanów
- Population: 1,900

Klimkówka [klʲimˈkufka] is a village in the administrative district of Gmina Rymanów, within Krosno County, Subcarpathian Voivodeship, in south-eastern Poland.

== Gallery ==
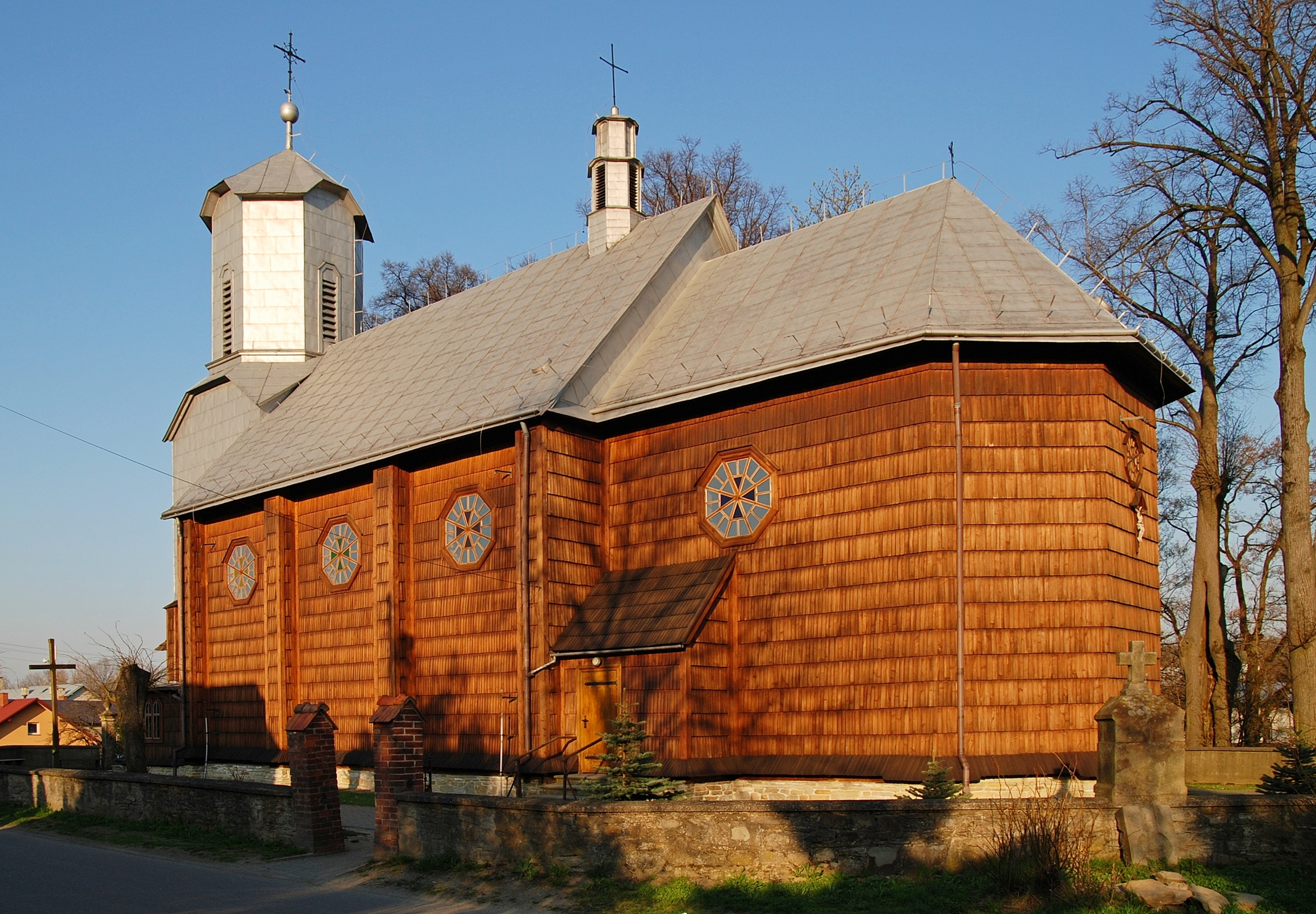
Church

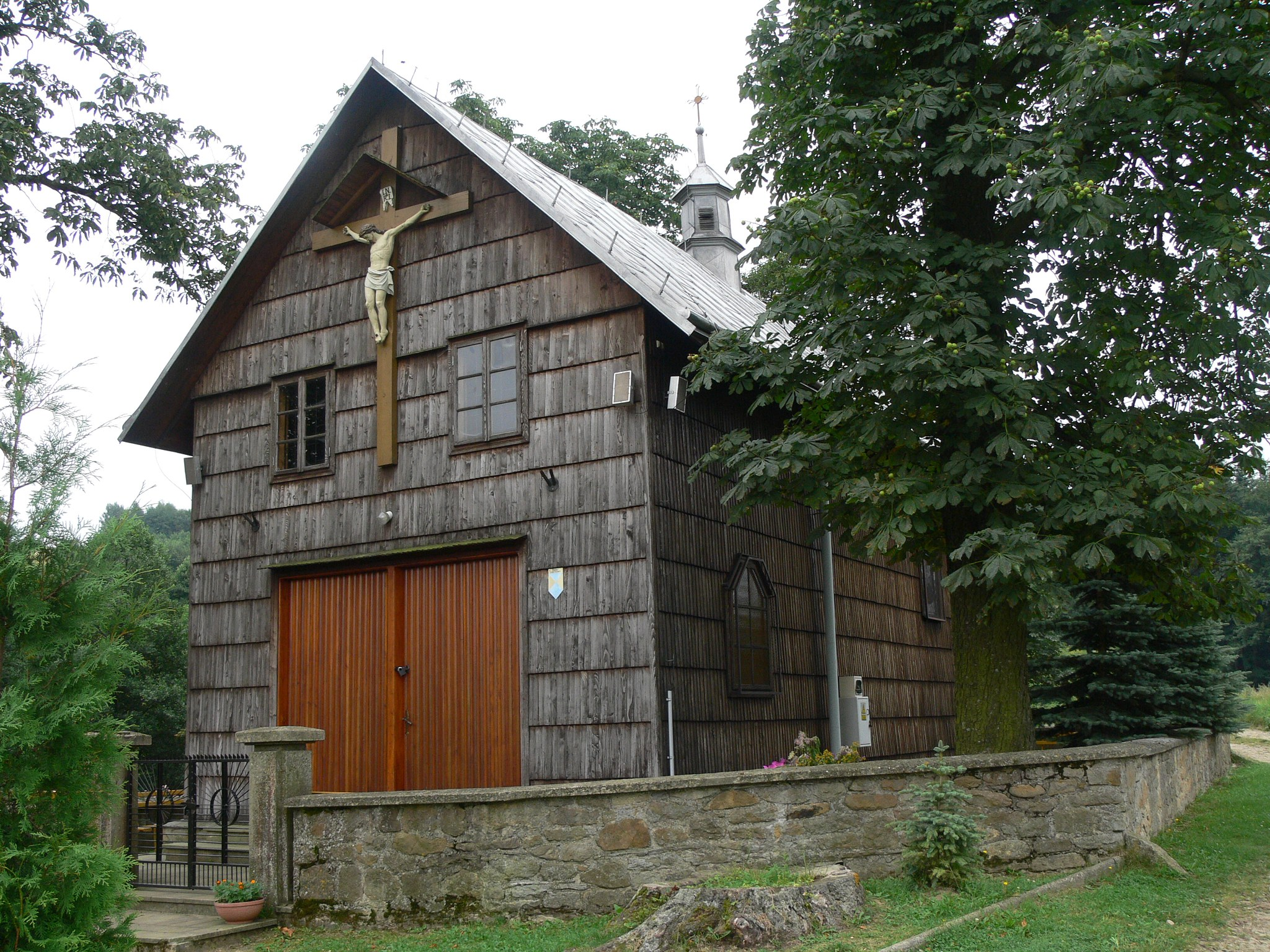
Church

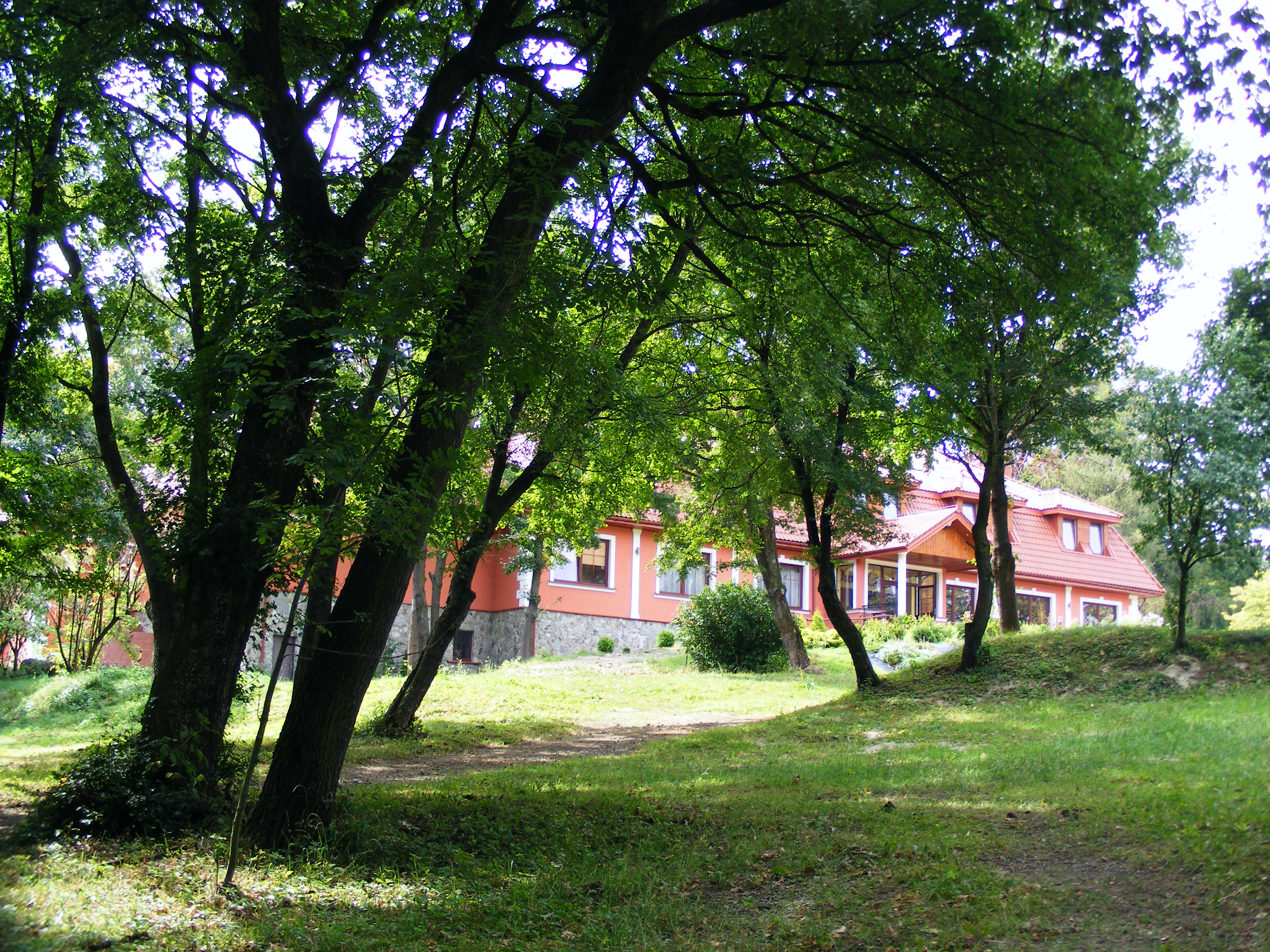
Manor House

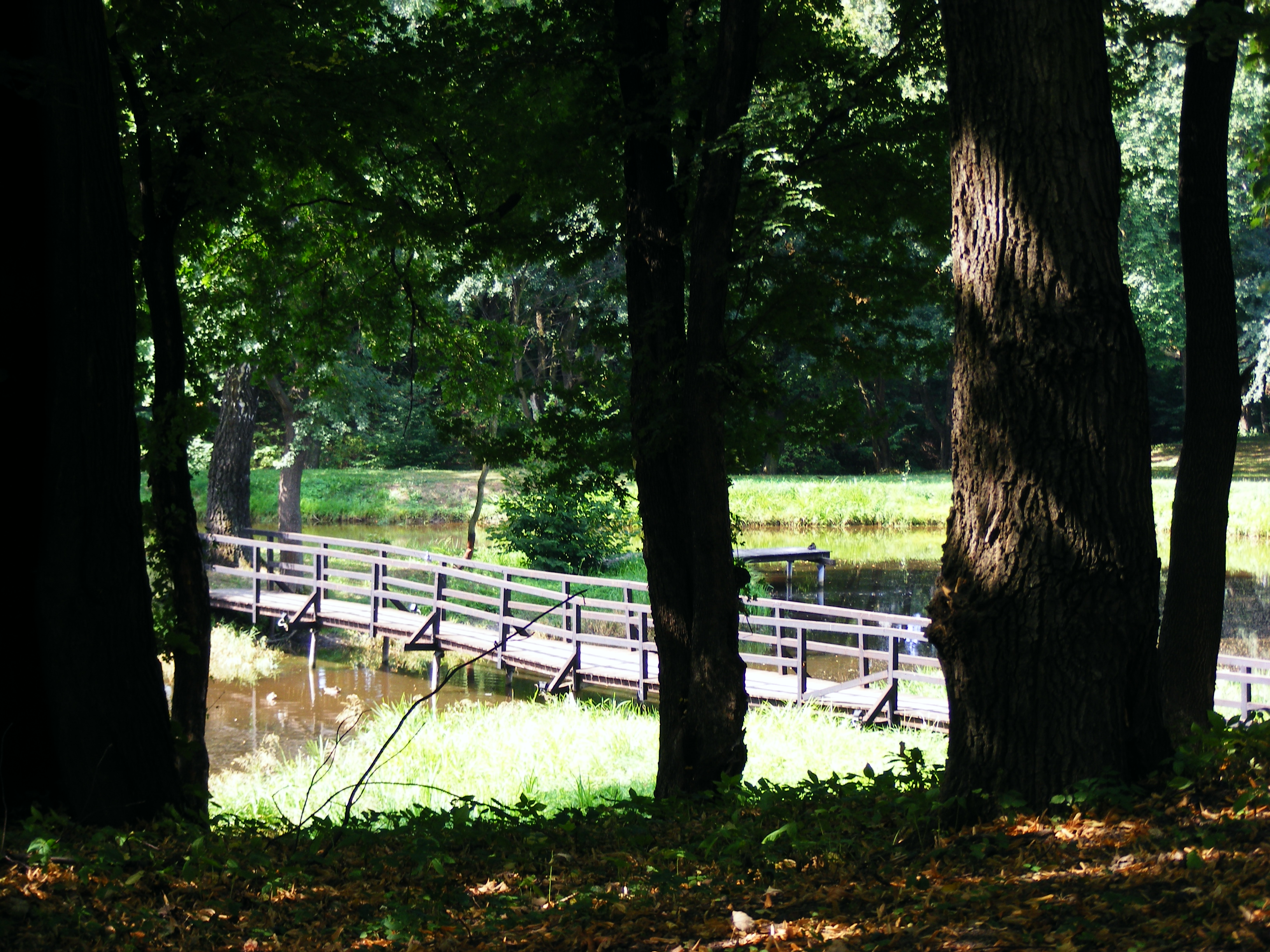
Park

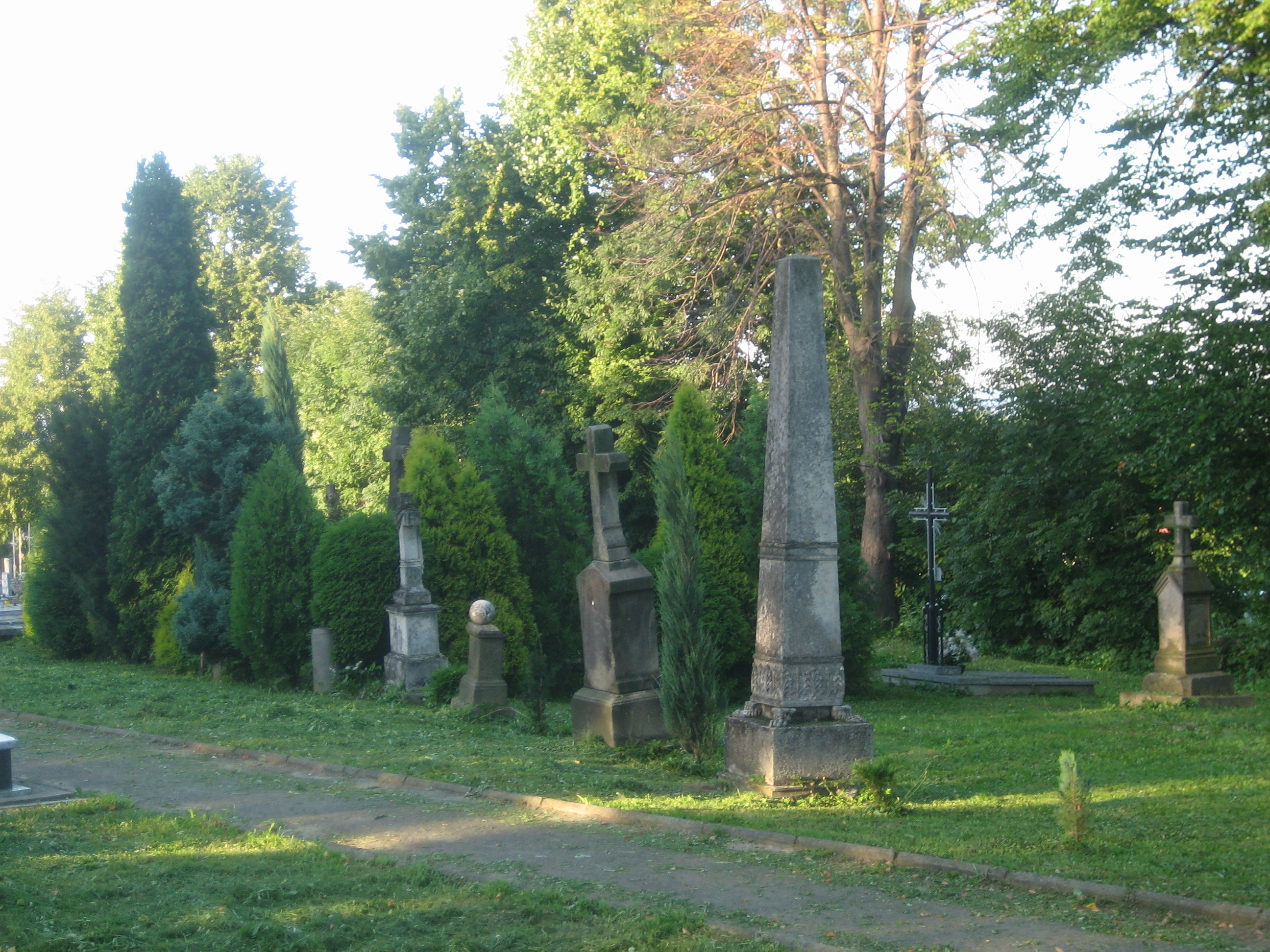
Cemetery

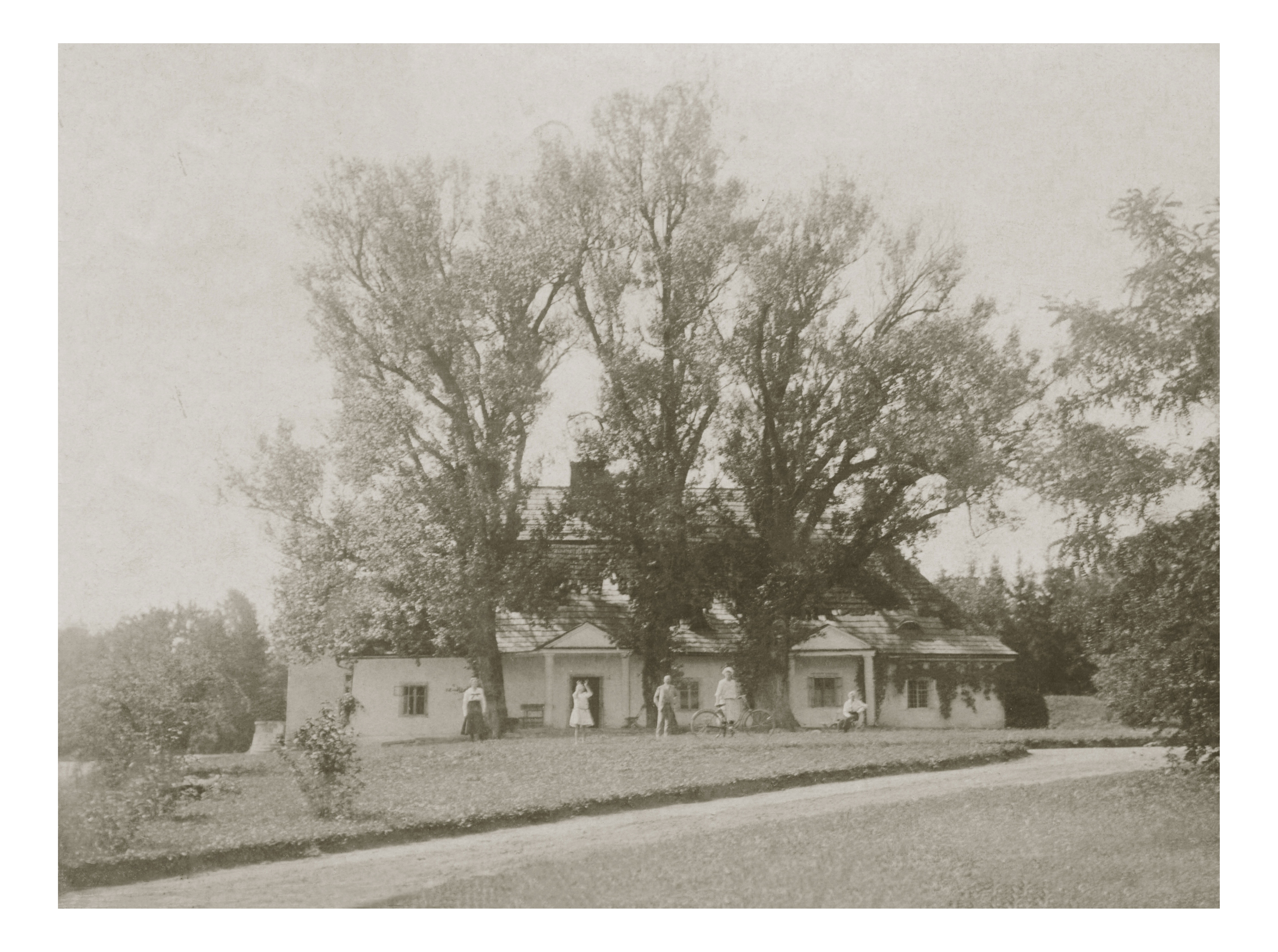
Ostaszewski Manor

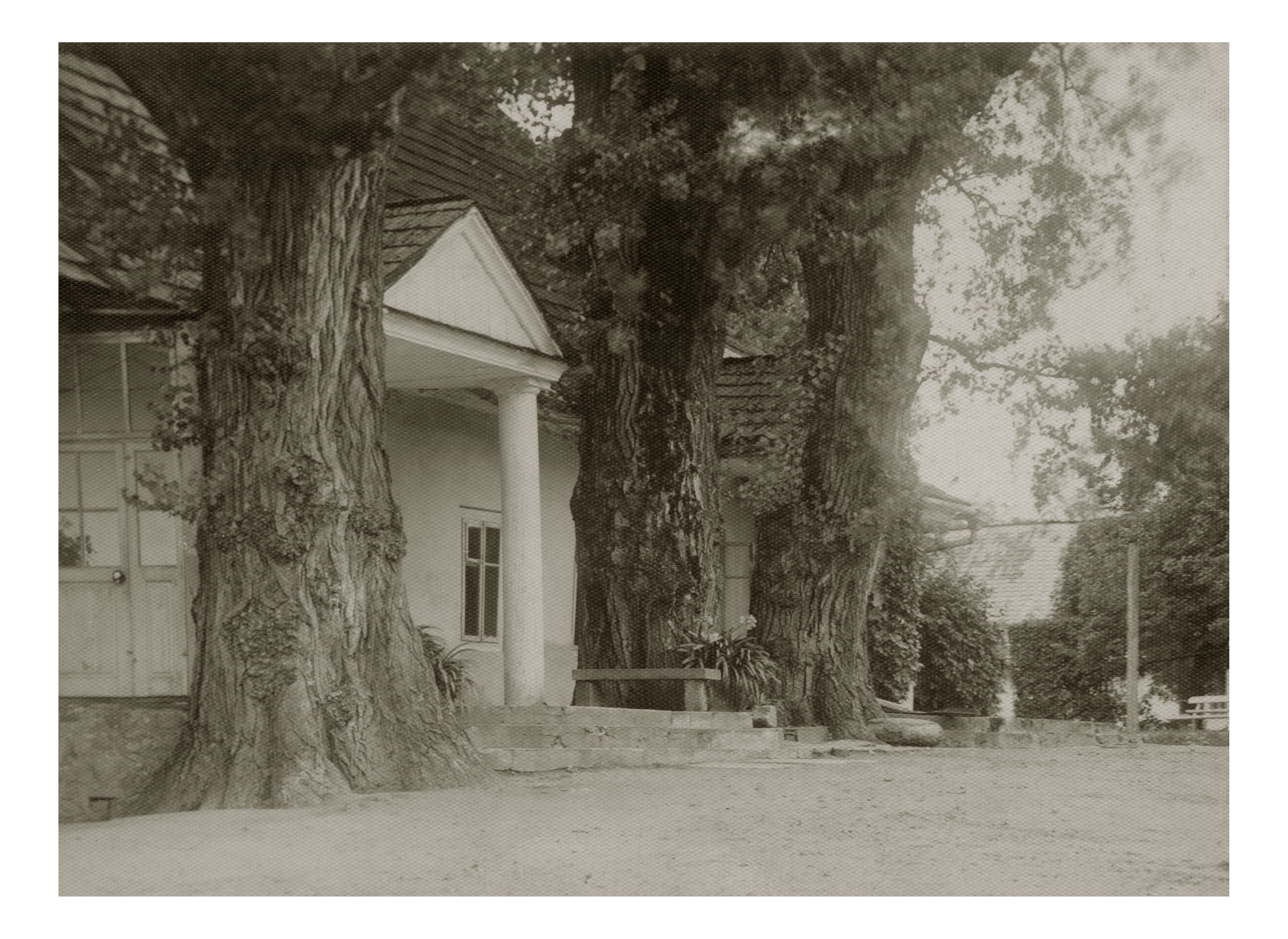
Ostaszewski Manor

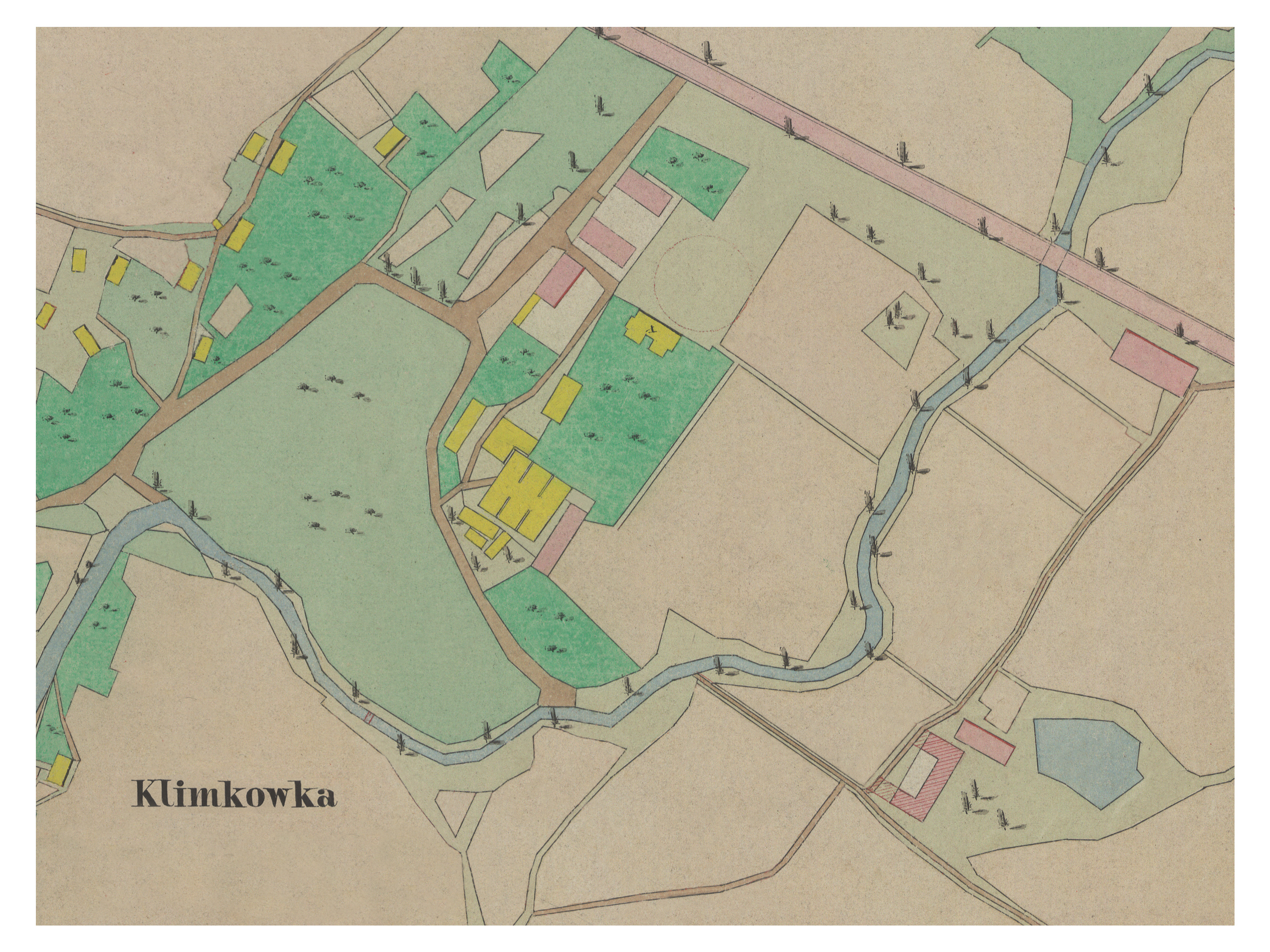
Map from 1851
