= Posada Górna =

- Village
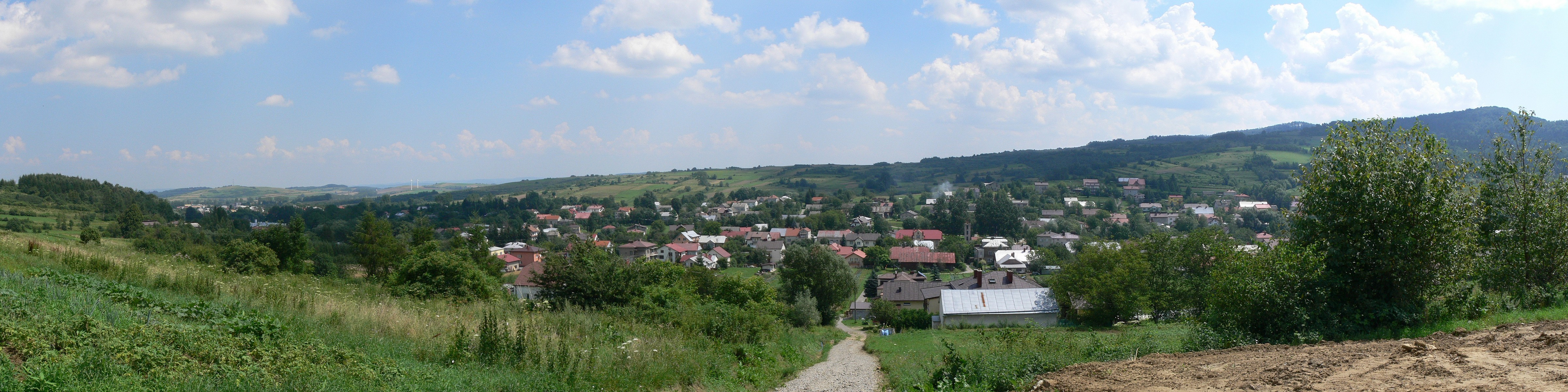
- Panorama of the village

- Location within Poland
- Coordinates: 49°34′N 21°52′E
- Country: Poland
- Voivodeship: Subcarpathian
- County: Krosno
- Gmina: Rymanów

Population
  - Total: 1,600
- Time zone: UTC+1 (CET)
  - Summer (DST): UTC+2 (CEST)
- Vehicle registration: RKR

Posada Górna [pɔˈsada ˈɡurna] is a village in the administrative district of Gmina Rymanów, within Krosno County, Subcarpathian Voivodeship, in south-eastern Poland.

Posada Górna is home to a volunteer fire service (OSP Posada Górna).

Four Polish citizens were murdered by Nazi Germany in the village during World War II.
