= Jerzy Pajączkowski-Dydyński =

Polish army officer (1894–2005)

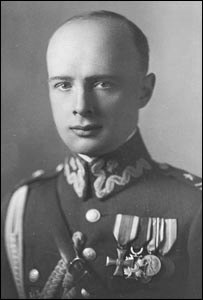
- Born: Jerzy Kazimierz Pajączkowski-Dydyński; 19 July 1894; Lwow, Austria-Hungary
- Died: 6 December 2005 (aged 111 years, 140 days); Grange-over-Sands, Cumbria, England
- Spouse: Maria Lewandowska 1924-1945, Dorothy Caterall
- Children: 2
- Military career
- Allegiance: Austro-Hungary; Republic of Poland
- Branch: Army
- Service years: 1915-1964
- Rank: World War I - Colonel; Republic of Poland Army - Lieutenant, Staff Officer; Polish Second Army - Captain, Major; World War II - Lieutenant Colonel (after 1964 Full Colonel)
- Unit: WWI Blue Army
- Conflicts: World War I, World War II, Polish War against Soviet Russia
- Awards: Officer's Cross of the Order of Polonia Restituta; Cross of Valour; Silver Cross of Merit; Romanian Decoration of Distinction

Jerzy Kazimierz Pajączkowski-Dydyński (19 July 1894 – 6 December 2005) was a Polish veteran of World War I living in the United Kingdom. In 1915, he was conscripted into the Austro-Hungarian army, and he later fought for Poland, reaching the rank of colonel. Upon the German invasion of Poland that triggered World War II in 1939, he escaped with his family to Romania, then France and finally England after France capitulated to Germany in June 1940. In later life he worked as a gardener in Scotland before moving to Cumbria with his daughter. He died at a nursing home, aged 111 years and 140 days, and had been Britain's oldest living man.

== Biography ==
Pajączkowski-Dydyński was born in Lwów (present-day Lviv, Ukraine), the capital of what became the Austrian province of Galicia. Although technically part of Austria-Hungary, the Galician Polish enjoyed a "degree of autonomy in local government". He began studying law at Lemberg University in 1912, transferring to the University of Vienna two years later.

=== World War I ===
Upon the outbreak of World War I in 1914, Galicians were subject to conscription, and Pajączkowski-Dydyński was called up. His training took place chiefly in Hungary and Bosnia. In 1916, he was sent as a sergeant to the Italian front in Montenegro and Albania. Although allied by treaty with Germany and Austria-Hungary, Italy had instead joined the war on the side of the Allied Powers in May 1915, in hopes of annexing parts of Austrian territory. In November 1918, he was taken prisoner in northern Italy during the last hours of the war. When he was freed the following Christmas, he was sent to France. Like many Galicians taken prisoner after being conscripted, Pajączkowski-Dydyński volunteered to join the Blue Army in France. This unit, which contained Polish-American volunteers, had seen action in 1918 in the allied campaign in Alsace-Lorraine, fostering an acute sense of Polish identity among the troops.

=== The Army of the Republic of Poland ===
When peace came, Pajączkowski-Dydyński elected to serve in the army of the newly proclaimed Republic of Poland guaranteed by the signatories to the Treaty of Versailles. He became a lieutenant and staff officer under General Józef Haller in an infantry division, and took part in the 1920–21 Polish War against Soviet Russia. This was fought between the Red Army and Poland over Poland's eastern border. Following the Armistice in November, he was moved to the Polish 2nd Army, and two years later he became a captain. After marrying Maria Lewandowska in 1924, Pajączkowski-Dydyński was stationed in Przemyśl. In 1925, he became a major, and in 1930, he moved to Warsaw with his wife and young son.

=== World War II ===
At the outbreak of the Second World War, Pajączkowski-Dydyński was a lieutenant-colonel. He was at the headquarters of the Polish Army in Warsaw when, on 1 September 1939, 1.8 million German troops invaded Poland. His wife and son fled to Romania by means of an evacuation train. When surrender seemed inevitable, he escaped to Bucharest to collect his family. Along with 30,000 other Polish servicemen, he was able to make his way to France through then still-neutral Italy.

When France fell to the Germans, Pajączkowski-Dydyński left for the UK, arriving in Plymouth on 28 June 1940. He stayed at Scottish military camps in Lanarkshire and Peebles, before being sent to Perth, where he took command of a Polish garrison. In 1943, he moved to Edinburgh, translating and adapting British military regulations and manuals for the use of Polish units.

=== Later life ===
When the war ended in May 1945, Pajączkowski-Dydyński made Edinburgh his home as Lwów had been annexed by the Soviet Union. Following the death of his wife Maria that year, he married Dorothy Caterall; the couple had a daughter.

Pajączkowski-Dydyński worked as a gardener. He was fluent in Polish, French, German and English. He had a passion for music and was a skilled viola player. In 1964, he was promoted to a full colonel. He did not return to Poland until 1989, when he was 95 years old. He died in Grange-over-Sands, Cumbria in 2005, aged 111, survived by ten grandchildren and ten great-grandchildren. He was predeceased by both wives.

He was closely related to Izabella Zielińska, a Polish pianist, who died at the age of 106.

== Decorations and medals ==
- Officer's Cross of the Order of Polonia Restituta (2001; previously awarded the Knight's Cross)
- Cross of Valour (1920)
- Silver Cross of Merit (1925)
- A Romanian decoration of distinction (1931)

These are in addition to three Austrian decorations he received in World War I for active service.

== See also ==
- Supercentenarian
