= Dobiesław of Oleśnica =

Polish statesman

Dobiesław Oleśnicki (Dobiesław of Oleśnica) was a soldier, aristocrat and politician in 15th century Poland.

Born in Sienno into the Dębno family, he was castellan of Wojnicki (1411–1433), Lublin (1433) and Sandomierz (1435); starosta of Kraków (1438); podczaszy of Kraków (1438–1439); and voivode of Sandomierz (1438–1440). He was a participant in the Battle of Grunwald and the commander of the Siege of Marienburg. He built a new castle in Rymanów, founded churches, and was the father of the Sienieńskich family. He was a brother of the Primate of Poland and is described by Maurycy Dzieduszycki as "comparing to lives of the Knights in song and poem".

== Battle of Grunwald ==
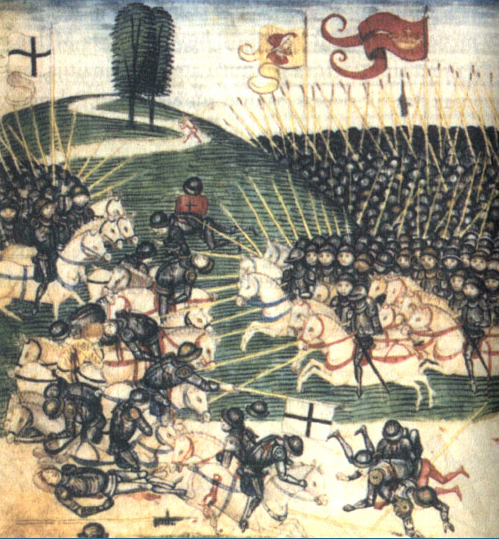
Battle of Grunwald

Oleśnicki is best known for his role in the Battle of Grunwald, which affected Polish/Prussian relations for over a century. According to Cronica conflictus, Dobiesław of Oleśnica thrust a lance through the Grand Master's neck, while Jan Długosz presented Mszczuj of Skrzynno as the killer. With the death of the Grand Master, the Teutonic Knights and Prussian army fell into disarray and were defeated by the Polish/Lithuanian forces, thus securing Polish supremacy in central Europe.

Among 50 Polish units in the battle of Grunwald, Długosz lists Oleśnicki's squadron as the 38th, and his banner as a white cross on a red field.

== Life ==
Oleśnicki was born in Sienno. In 1404, he accompanied King Jogaila to a Congress with the Grand Master of the Teutonic Knights, Konrad von Jungingen. In a tournament organized by the Grand Master, Oleśnicki conquered all challenges by successively dropping from the saddles all previous winners of the fights.

In 1413, he married Catherine, the daughter of Dymitr of Goraj and his wife Beata of Mokrsko (died 30 April 1424). Through his marriage he was the Lord of Rymanów, a town in Krosno County, Subcarpathian Voivodeship. He began construction of a castle there and in 1409 hosted King Władysław Jagiełło there. In 1431 Dobiesław founded a brick church in the Gothic style in the nearby town of Sienno, where he was born.

With Jan Kobylański of Grzymała, he also besieged the city of Malbork. As a trusted advisor to the King he was a signatory to the Act of Union of Horodło of 1413 and he signed the peace in Brest Kujawski, on 31 December 1435. In 1440, he traveled with his nephew Zbigniew Oleśnicki, the Bishop of Kraków, to Budapest on a diplomatic trip. He died in 1440.

== Gallery ==
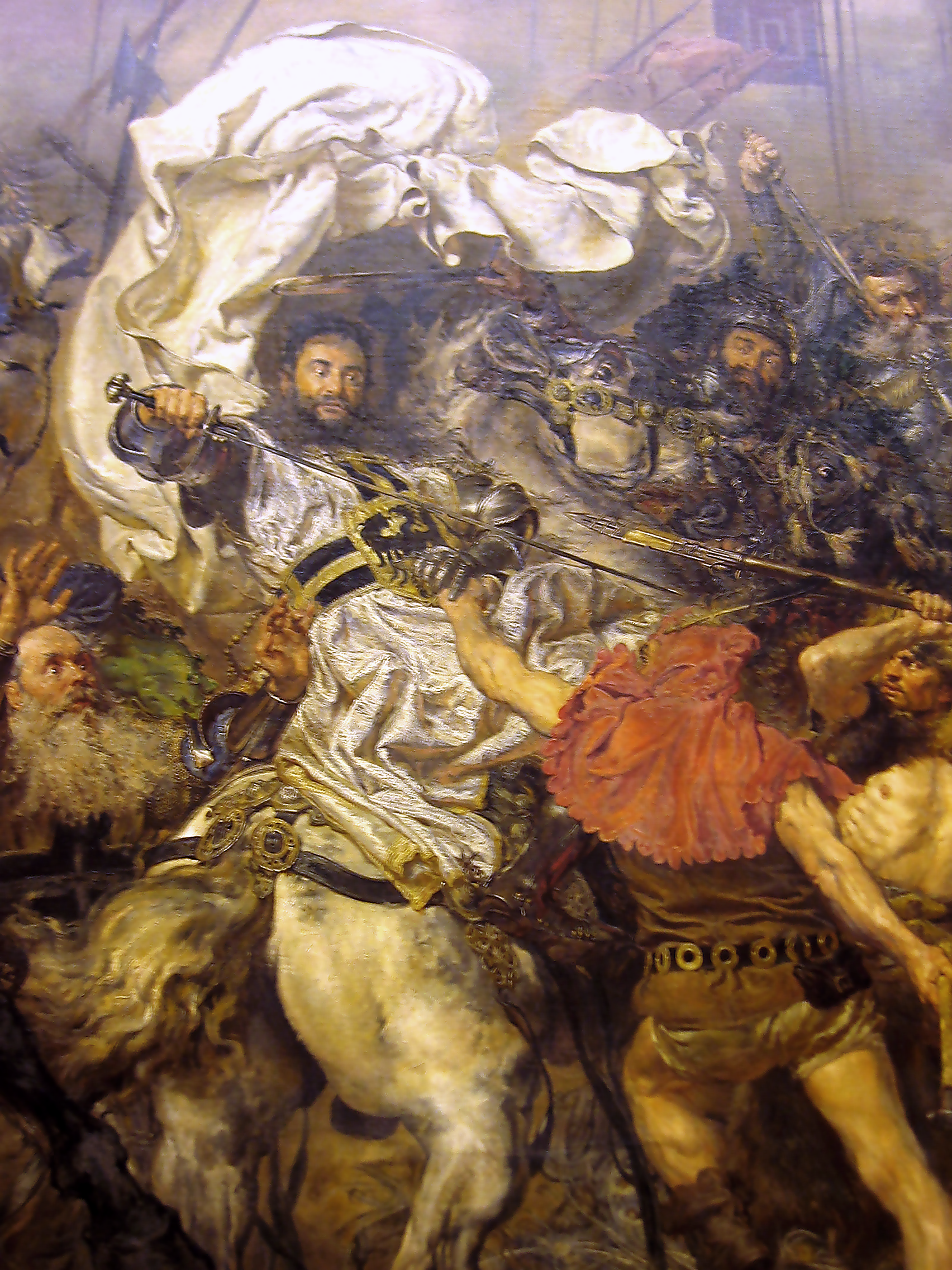
Death of Ulrich von Jungingen, detail of the painting by Jan Matejko, 1878

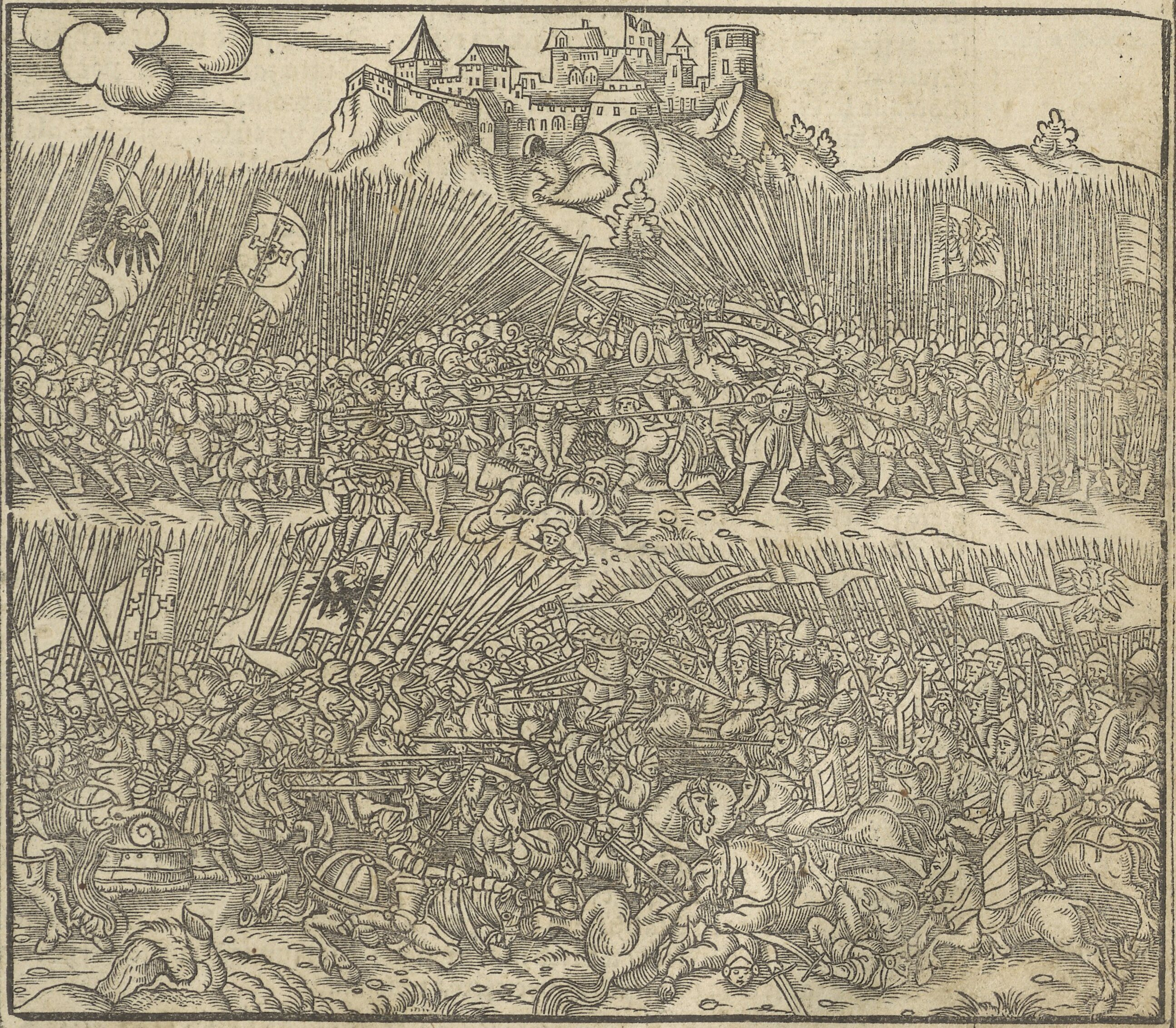
Battle of Grunwald. Engraving by Marcin Bielski, 1564

== Family ==
- Father: Dobiesław Kurozwęcki (d. 1397) politician and Castellan of Kraków
- Brother: Jan Oleśnicki (d. 1413) Starosta of Vilnius and a judge in Krakow
- Brother: Zbigniew Oleśnicki
- Son: Dymitr of Sienna (d. 1465), Castellan of Sanok and Priest in Skalbmierski, Canon of Kraków in 1452, and Gniezno from 1454, and heir to the Rymanowa
- Son: Nicholas Sienna (d. 1484), Canon of Kraków, a Scholasticus from 1448, Canon of Gniezno from 1455, Archdeacon of Sandomierz from 1478
- Son: Jan of Sienno and Oleska (died before 1477) Castellan of Lwów, Przemysl of the Chamber in 1439–1448, and Starost of Sandomierz
- Son: Jakob of Sienna (1413–1480), Archbishop of Gniezno from 1474, Bishop of Krakow, Bishop of Włocławek
- Son: Paul of Sienna (c. 1410–1444) the Royal Secretary (1439), royal courtier (1444)
- Son: Andrzej Sienieński (d. 1494) Chamberlain of Sandomierz
- Daughter: Dorothea of Sienna
- Son: Zygmunt, died young
- Son: Wiktor, died young
- Son: Zbigniew, died young
- Son: Marcin i Maciej, died young
- Son-in-law: Jan Koniecpolski (d. 1455) Chancellor of the Crown
- Grandson: John Sienieński from Sienna and Oleska (d. between 1510 and 1513), Castellan of Małogoszcz
- Grandson: Victor Sienieński (c. 1463–31 March 1530) Castellan of Małogoszcz
- Grandson: John Sienieński from Sienna and Gołogór (d. after 1526), Castellan of Kamieniec
