= Sienno, Masovian Voivodeship =

Sienno
- Town
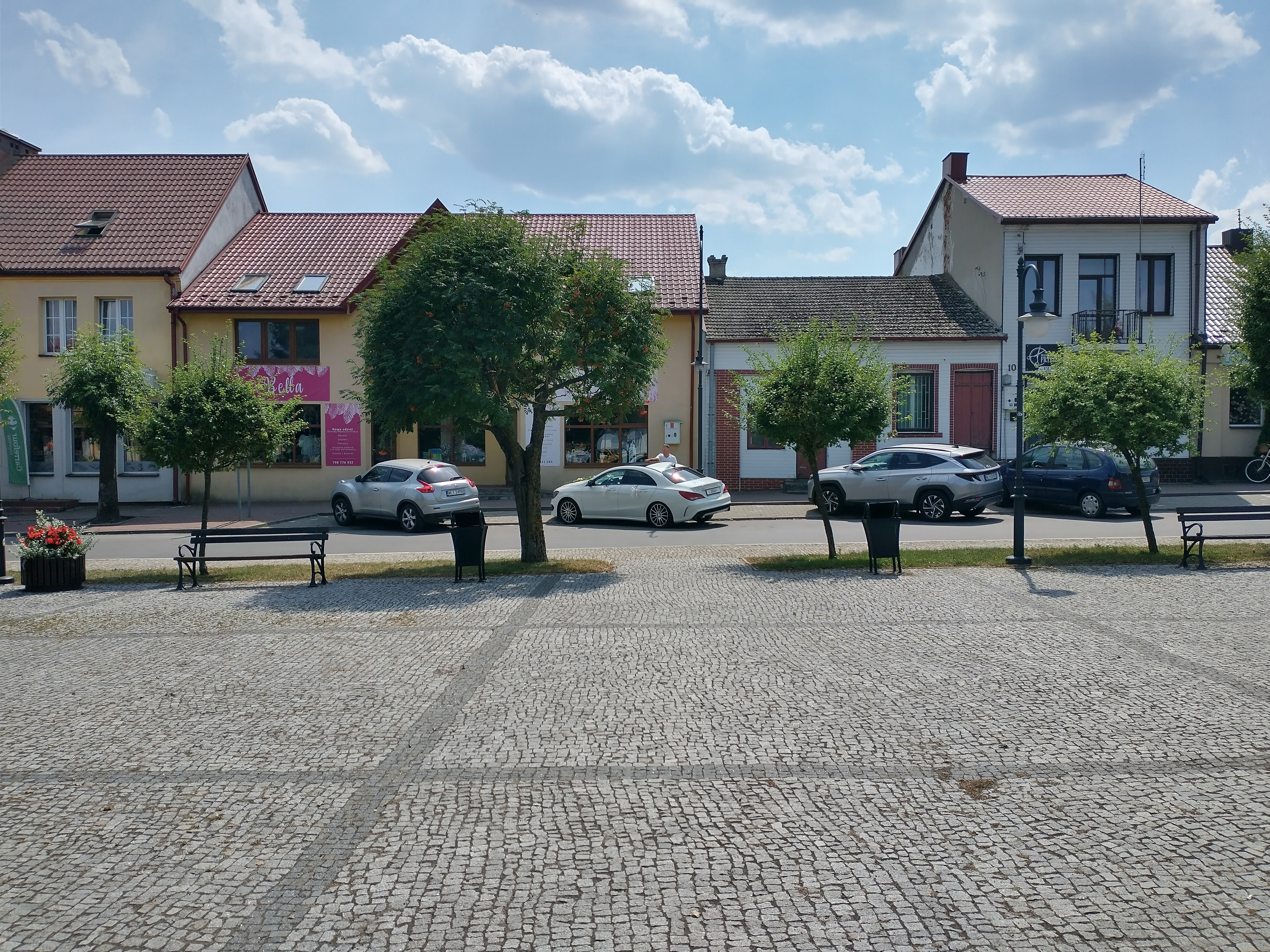
- Town center

- Coat of arms

- Location within Poland
- Coordinates: 51°5′22″N 21°28′36″E
- Country: Poland
- Voivodeship: Masovian
- County: Lipsko
- Gmina: Sienno

Population
  - Total: 1,000
- Time zone: UTC+1 (CET)
  - Summer (DST): UTC+2 (CEST)
- Vehicle registration: WLI
- Website: http://www.sienno.pl/

Sienno [ˈɕɛnnɔ] is a town in Lipsko County, Masovian Voivodeship, in east-central Poland. It is the seat of the gmina Sienno (administrative district).

== History ==
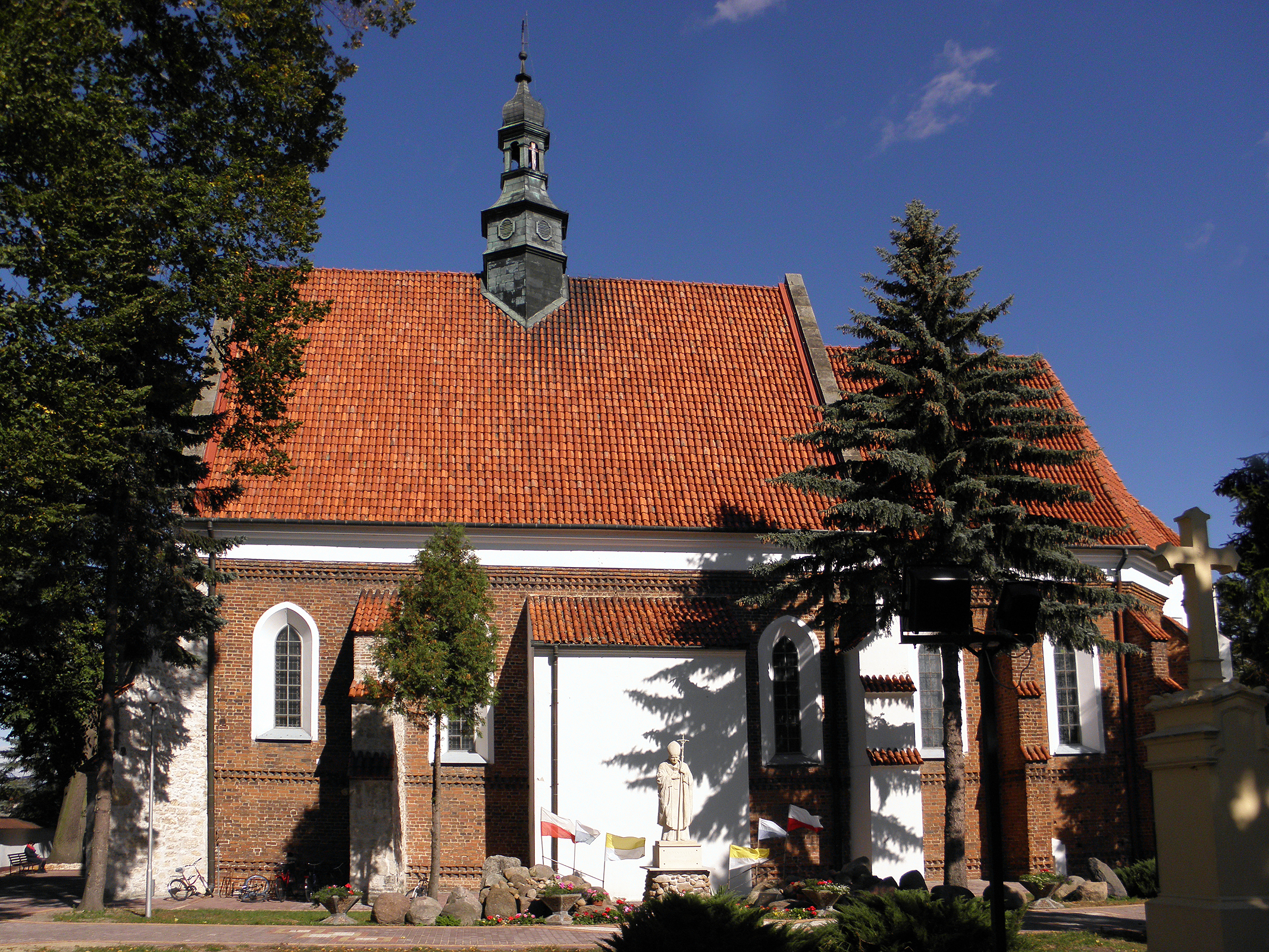
Gothic Saint Sigismund church

The history of Sienno dates back to at least the 14th century, in 1375 was built the first wooden church, at that time it belonged to the parish in Chotcza. Sienno received town rights in approx. 1430. Between 1431 and 1442 Dobisław z Oleśnicy, the lord of Sienno, was built of a church of brick in the Gothic style and it was consecrated by Cardinal Zbigniew Oleśnicki.

In the 16th century the church was replaced by Sebastian Sienieński as a calvinist church. Catholics reconsecrated the building at the beginning of the 18th century. It was partially destroyed by fire in 1879 and again during World War I. Rebuilt in the interwar period, it is today an example of Gothic architecture. Five Gothic paintings on Panel with from 1460 are located in Medieval Art Gallery in the National Museum in Warsaw.

In 1628, King Sigismund III Vasa established annual fairs.

Following the Third Partition of Poland in 1795, the town was annexed by Austria. After the Polish victory in the Austro-Polish War of 1809, it was regained by Poles and included within the short-lived Duchy of Warsaw, and after the dissolution of the duchy in 1815, it passed to the Russian Partition of Poland. Sienna has lost its town rights after the January Uprising in 1869. Sienna residents participated in the January uprising and in the resistance during World War II. There was a battle 7 km (4 mi) to the North of the village. This was the place of death of Colonel Dionizy Czachowski.

Sienno had a significant Jewish population which may have begun in the 16th century. In 1921, Jews numbered 735, about 44 percent of the town's population. By the German occupation of September 1939, that number had grown to around 800. The Germans forced Sienno's Jews into a ghetto in December 1941 and other Jews of the region were deported into it. Overcrowding contributed to a typhus epidemic in February 1942. Without a doctor or hospital, several died. When the Jewish population was rounded up in October 1942, there were 2,000. All were sent to the Treblinka extermination camp where they were gassed. Other Jews from the region were then briefly brought into the empty ghetto, later also to be gassed at Treblinka. Some of Sienno's Jews escaped to the forest where they formed, with others, a partisan band. Without many armaments, they were wiped out by Germans in December 1942. The number of Holocaust survivors from Sienno is unknown. The historic wooden synagogue in Sienno was destroyed by the Germans as was the cemetery. A famous Rabbi from Sienno was Abraham Joshua Heschel, the famous Jewish philosopher, theologian, and writer.

== People of Sienno ==
Sienno was the home town of prominent members of Dębno coat of arms including among others, Bishop of Krakow Cardinal Zbigniew Oleśnicki (later Archbishop of Gniezno), Jakub z Sienna. Coat of Arms for Sienno is the coat of arms of the Dębno family, which, inter alia, includes the Oleśnicki's and Sienieński's families.

- John from Sienno, founder of Zloczow 1442
- Dobiesław Sienieński, Canon of Gniezno, Dean of Kielce and Radom
- Zbigniew Sienieński, Castellan
- Zbigniew Oleśnicki Cardinal
- Włodzimierz Sedlak, priest, professor
- Abraham Joshua Heschel, the Jewish philosopher and theologian, Rabbi in Sienno
- Lucjan Fornalski, landowner, owner of a nearby farm Coins (Narożniki)

== Gallery ==
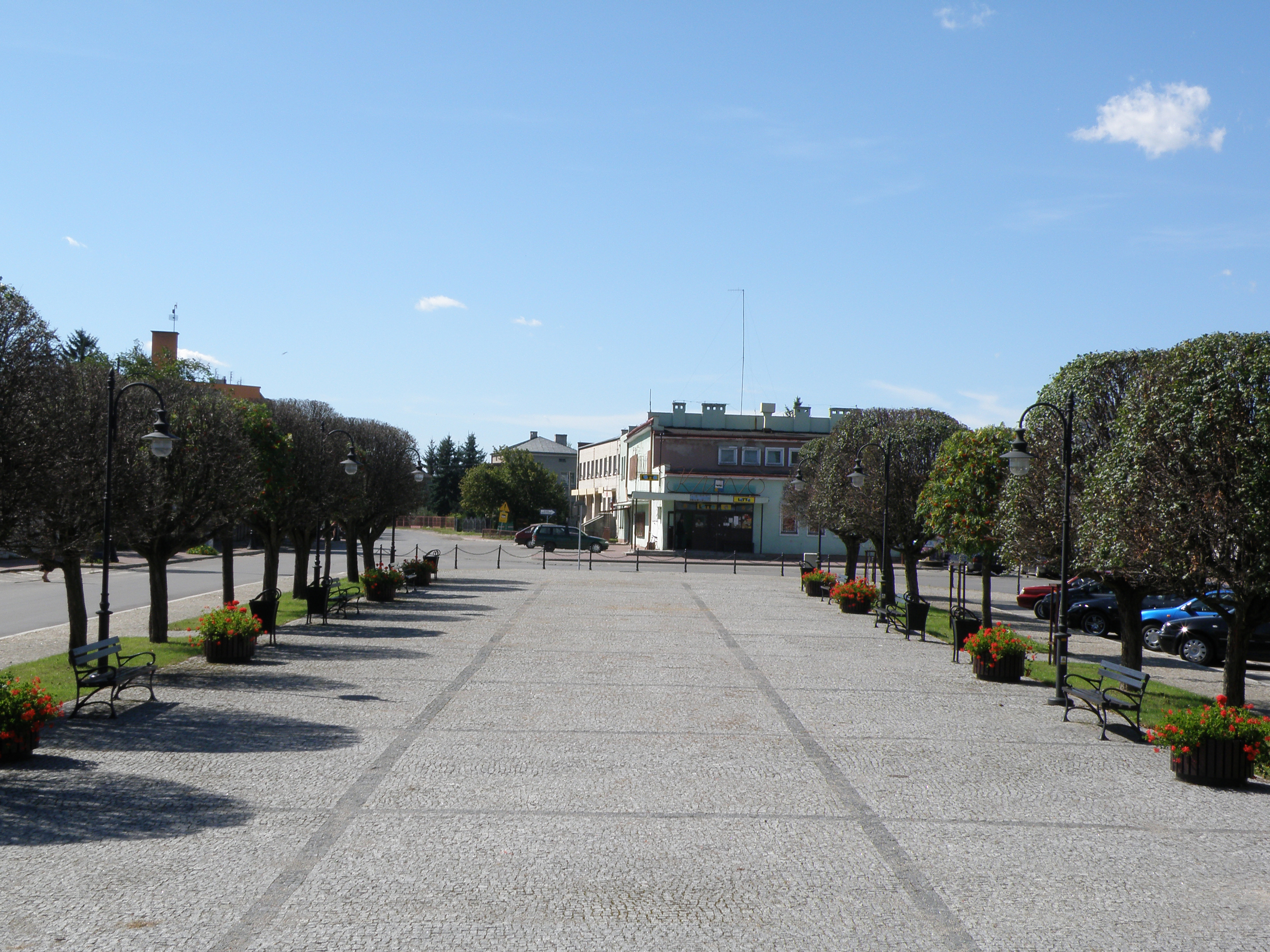
Main square

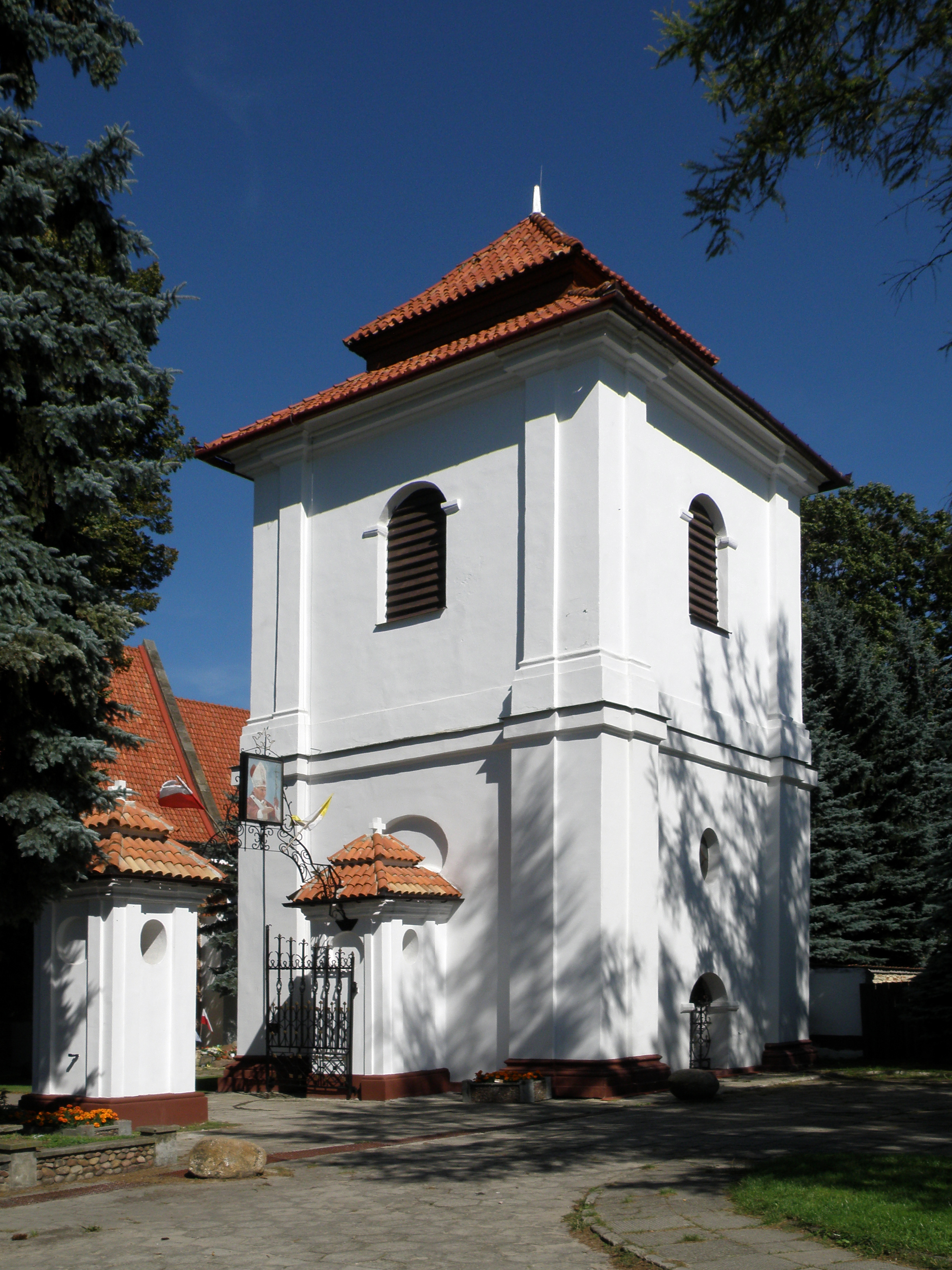
Bell tower of Saint Sigismund's Church

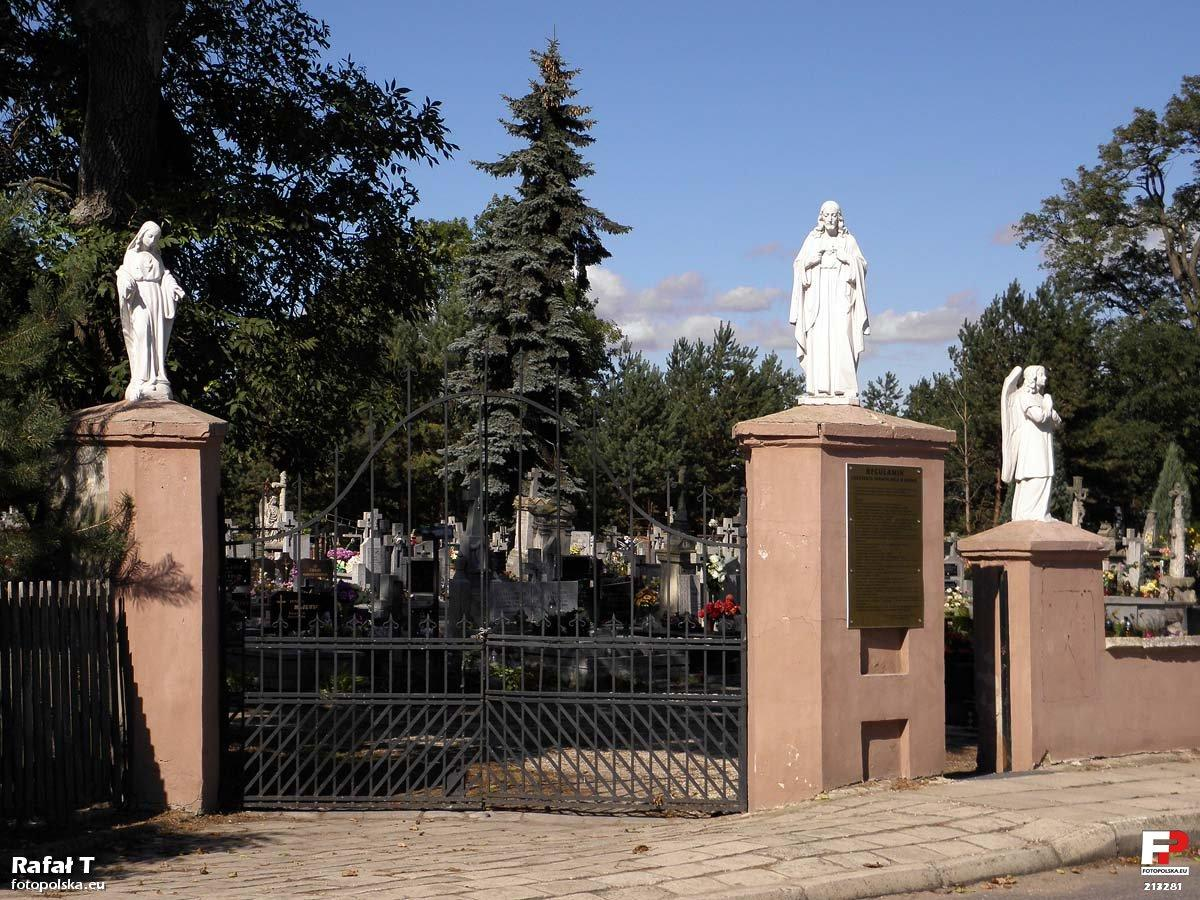
Catholic cemetery

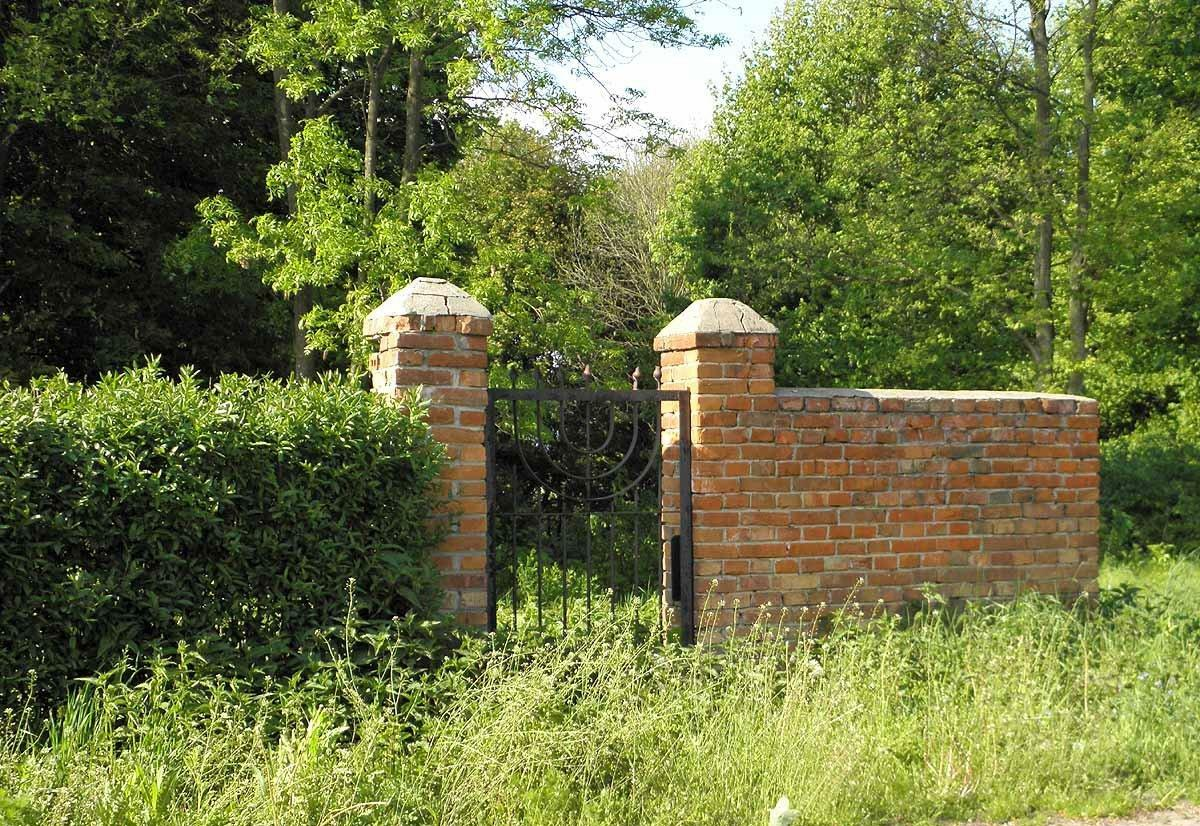
Jewish cemetery
