= Dukla Palace =

Coordinates: 49.5570°N 21.6848°E

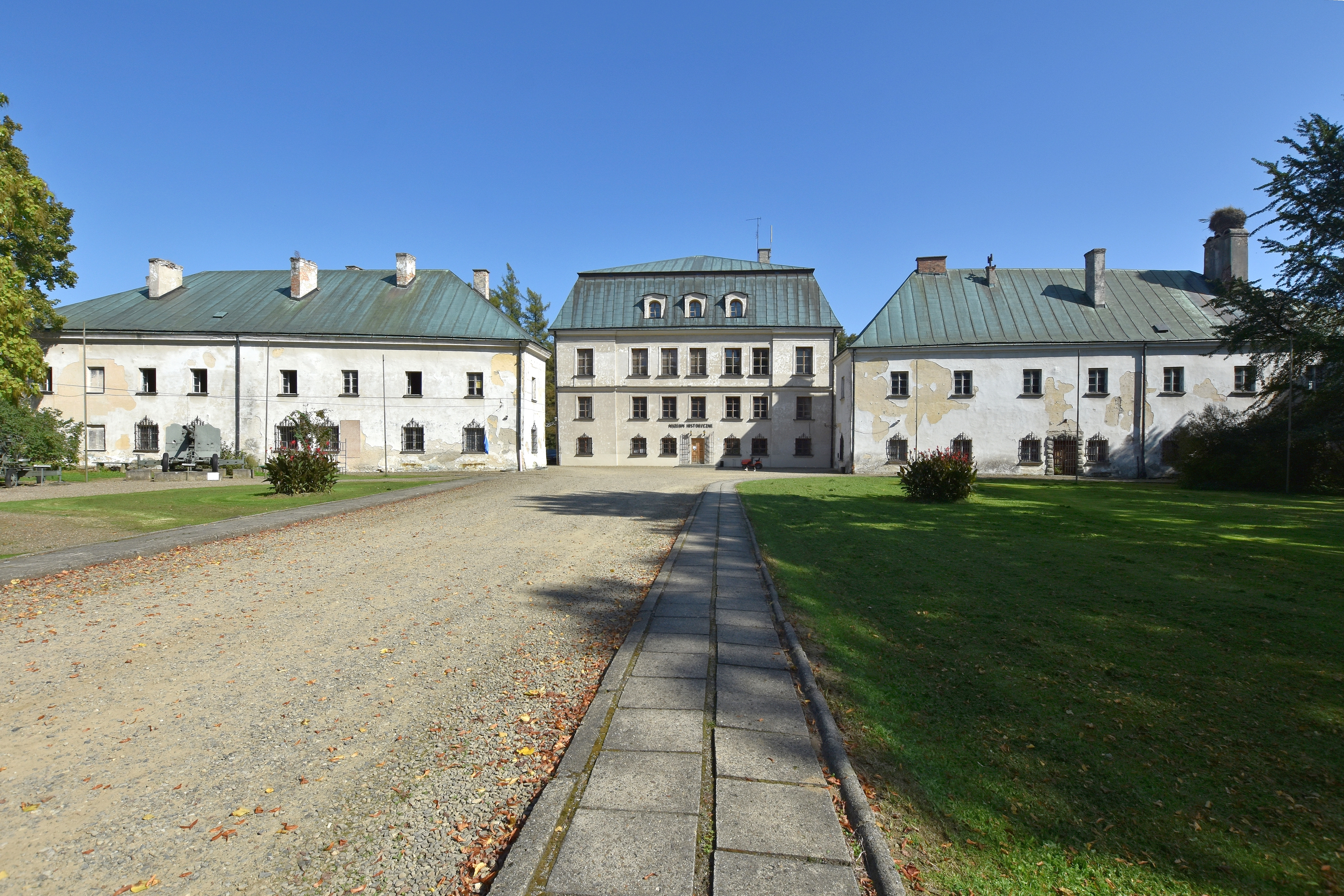
- Interactive map of the Dukla Palace area

General information
- Type: Palace
- Architectural style: Late Baroque
- Location: Dukla, Poland
- Owner: Tarnowscy family

Dukla Palace is a Polish palace and park complex formed in 1764–1765, located in the town of Dukla.

This lavish late-baroque magnate residence in the French style with exceptional architectural and landscape values is a unique example of the "entre cour et jardin" concept in the Subcarpathian Voivodeship. The Mniszech residence was one of the most beautiful in Poland at that time.

Currently, there is a museum in the palace.

== History ==
From the time of its foundation, Dukla was a private town, which in 1540 was bought by Jan Jordan from Zakliczyn from Ewa Cikowska, the widow of Stanisław Cikowski. Around the mid-16th century, Jordan built a brick castle in Dukla. In 1636, the structure, which had fallen into ruin, was acquired by the starosta (district governor) of Sanok, Franciszek Bernard Mniszech, the brother of Marina Mniszech, Tsarina of Russia. Between 1636 and 1638, he established a residence on the existing ruins, designed in the popular "palazzo in fortezza" style of that time, which combined features of a palace with defensive characteristics. The simple, brick, two-story building, nearly square in plan, with four bastions at the corners, was surrounded by earth fortifications. In 1661, Franciszek Mniszech died. The building was finished by his son, Józef Antoni, in the years 1696–1709.

In 1740, Jerzy August Mniszech, the Crown Court Marshal, became the heir of Dukla and the surrounding estates. Twenty-four years later, he moved to the palace in Dukla. Together with his wife, Maria Amalia, they decided to make it an important center of social and political life with a significance beyond the regional level, modeled after Warsaw or Puławy. Between 1764 and 1765, a new late-Baroque residence complex in the "entre cour et jardin" style was established. The palace was extended by one story, reoriented along an east–west axis, and the front (western) façade was framed with two outbuildings constructed on the former western bastions. The bastions on the park side were demolished, and the existing earth fortifications were removed as well.

The palace interiors were partially remodeled: the upper floor housed private apartments, while the second floor featured reception rooms with a salon and a chapel. The outbuildings were converted into living quarters for the servants, theater artists, and the court orchestra, as well as technical rooms (kitchens, laundries, and others). A theater was also built (which no longer exists). French and Polish plays, including works by Jan Potocki, were performed there. There was a court orchestra. The interiors were adorned with paintings by well-known masters, ancient antiques, valuable military artifacts, and artistic furniture. Following the example of other magnates, Mniszech maintained his own private army, known as the court militia, which included an elite company of dragoons. Geometric gardens were also established, equipped with garden structures and small architectural features such as stone bridges, garden benches, fences, and vases. The redesign project was probably carried out by the Dresden architect Jan Fruderyk Knobl, and the construction work was directed by Leonard Andrys, the Mniszchs' court builder.

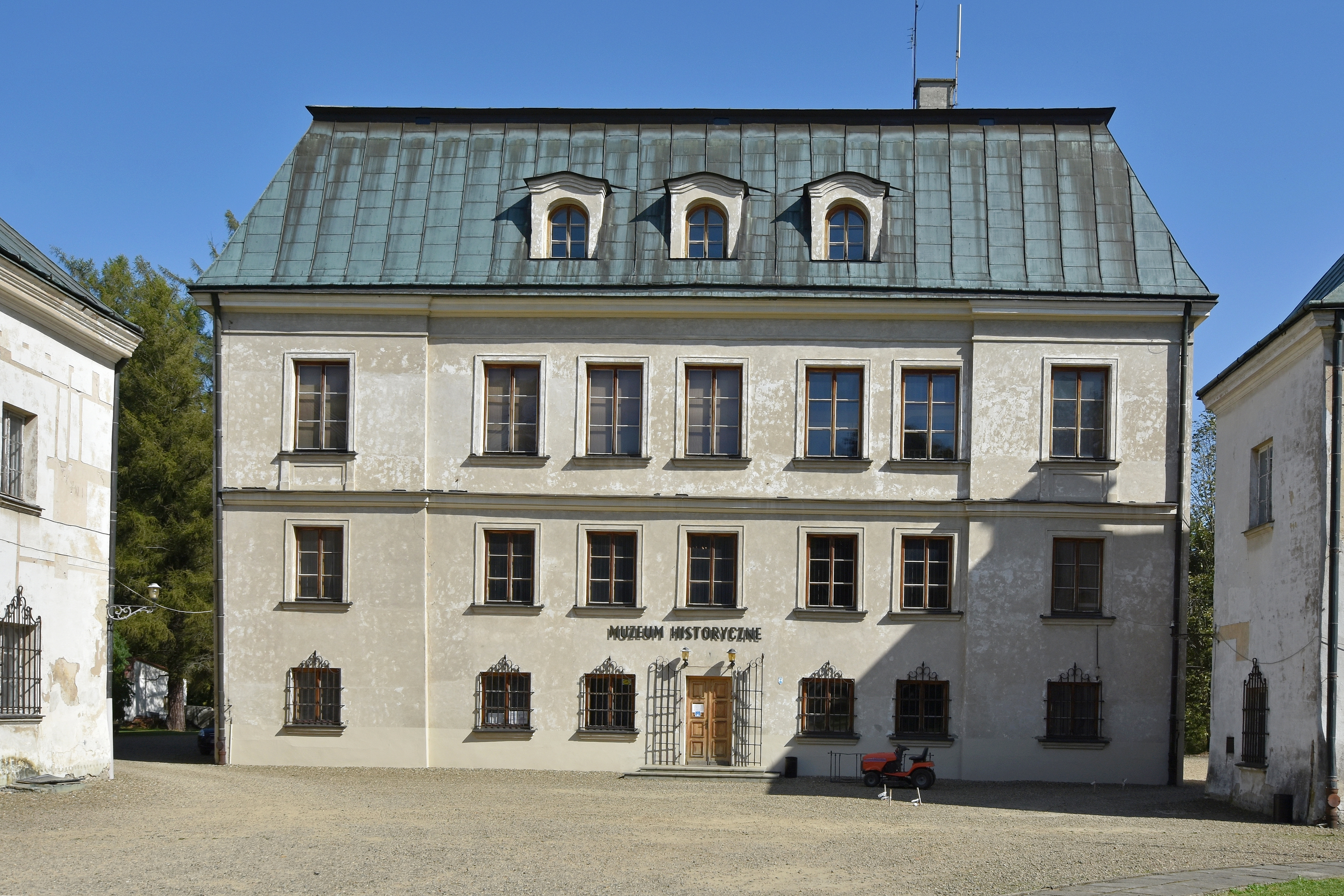
Palace – front elevation

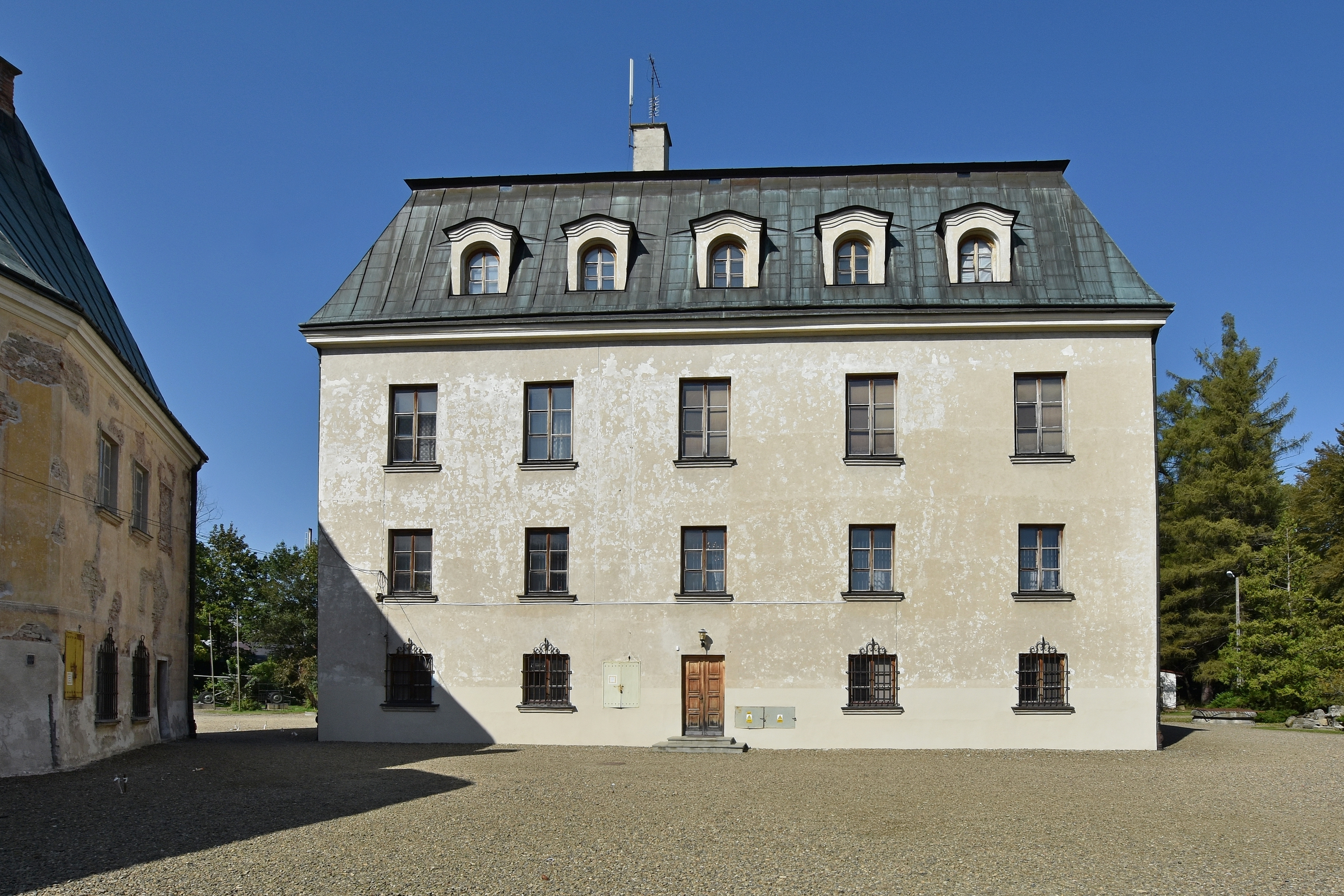
Palace – southern façade

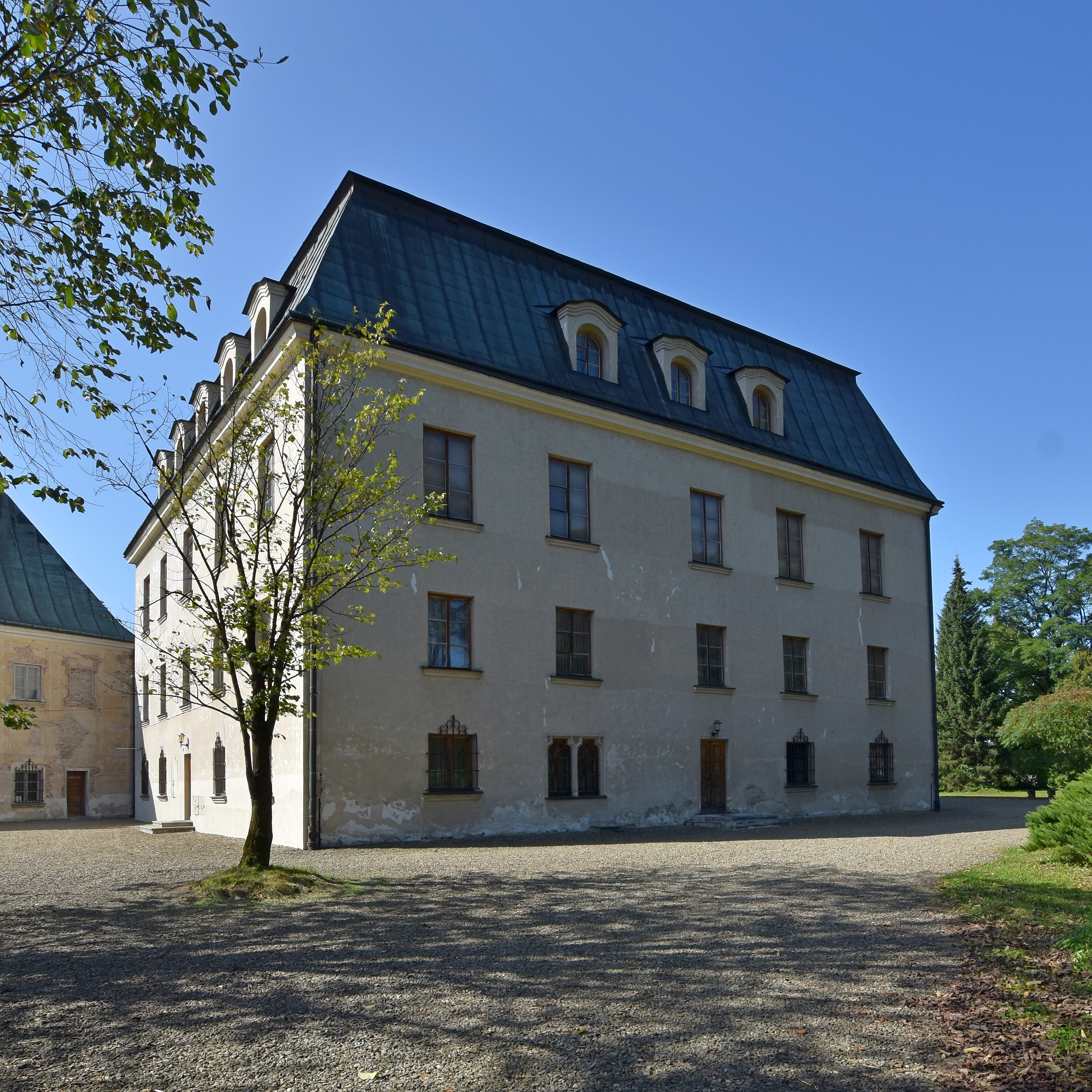
Palace – eastern façade

In 1772, the palace was occupied by Austrian troops who set up barracks there. Two years later, the estate passed into the hands of the Potocki family due to the marriage of the owners' daughter, Józefina Amalia Mniszech, to Szczęsny Potocki. In 1779, Józef Ossoliński, voivode of Volhynia, became the owner of the palace complex. After his death, the property was purchased by Antoni Stadnicki, followed by his son Franciszek, then inherited by Franciszek's daughter, Helena, wife of Wojciech Męciński. Męciński gathered a collection of paintings in the Dukla palace, one of the largest collections in Galicia at that time. The palace remained in the hands of his family until 1923. In 1923, due to Stanisław Tarnowski (1918–2006), who was adopted by the Męciński family, the palace remained in the hands of the Tarnowski family until World War II.

In the 19th century, the palace suffered several fires: in 1810, 1821 and 1848. It underwent a more serious transformation in 1875, when, due to the efforts of Adam Męciński, the internal divisions of the ground floor and the decoration of all façades were changed.

After the operations of World War I, the palace, partially damaged and robbed, remained uninhabited in the interwar period. The destruction was completed by World War II. Completely stripped and ruined, it remained without a roof or ceilings for several years. It was taken over by the State Treasury. In 1958, the annexes were renovated, and in 1962–1963 the walls were secured, ceilings were laid and the mansard roof of the palace was reconstructed. The Brotherhood in Arms Museum was established in one of the annexes. In the 1980s, the reconstruction of the palace was completed and it housed the Historical Museum under a new name. At the beginning of the 21st century, the foundation walls were insulated.

On September 18, 2012, the palace and park complex in Dukla was regained by the Tarnowski family.

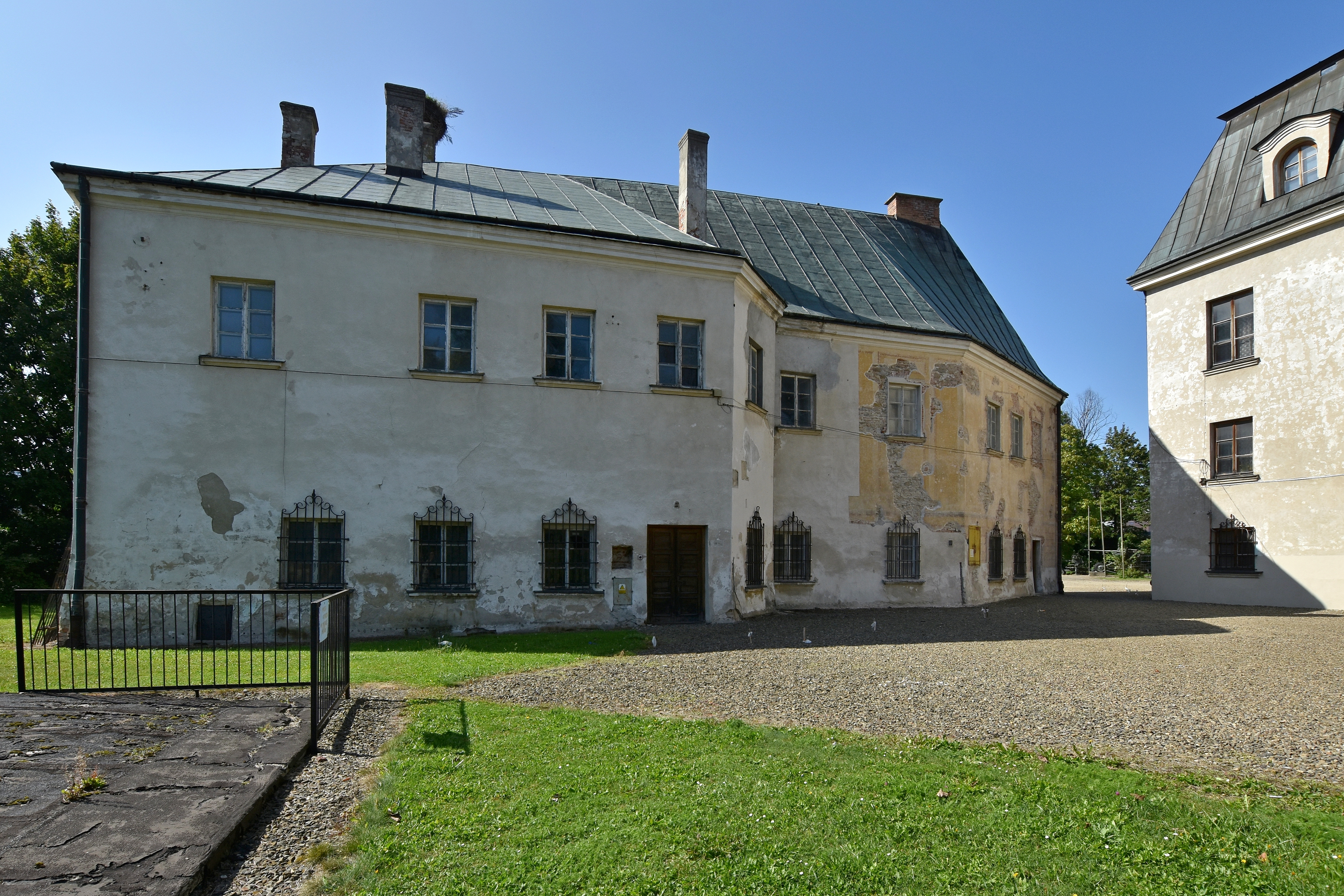
Southern outbuilding

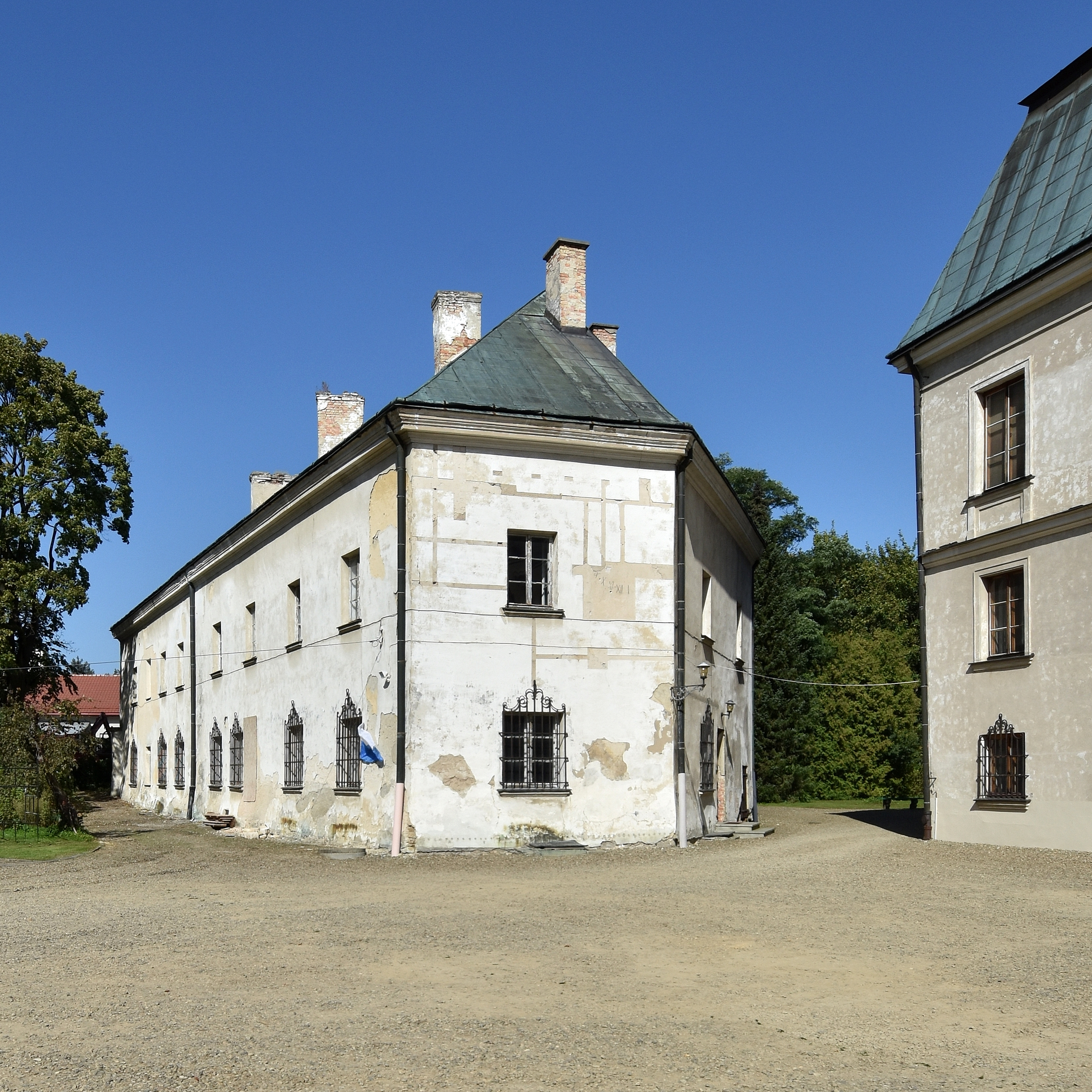
Northern outbuilding

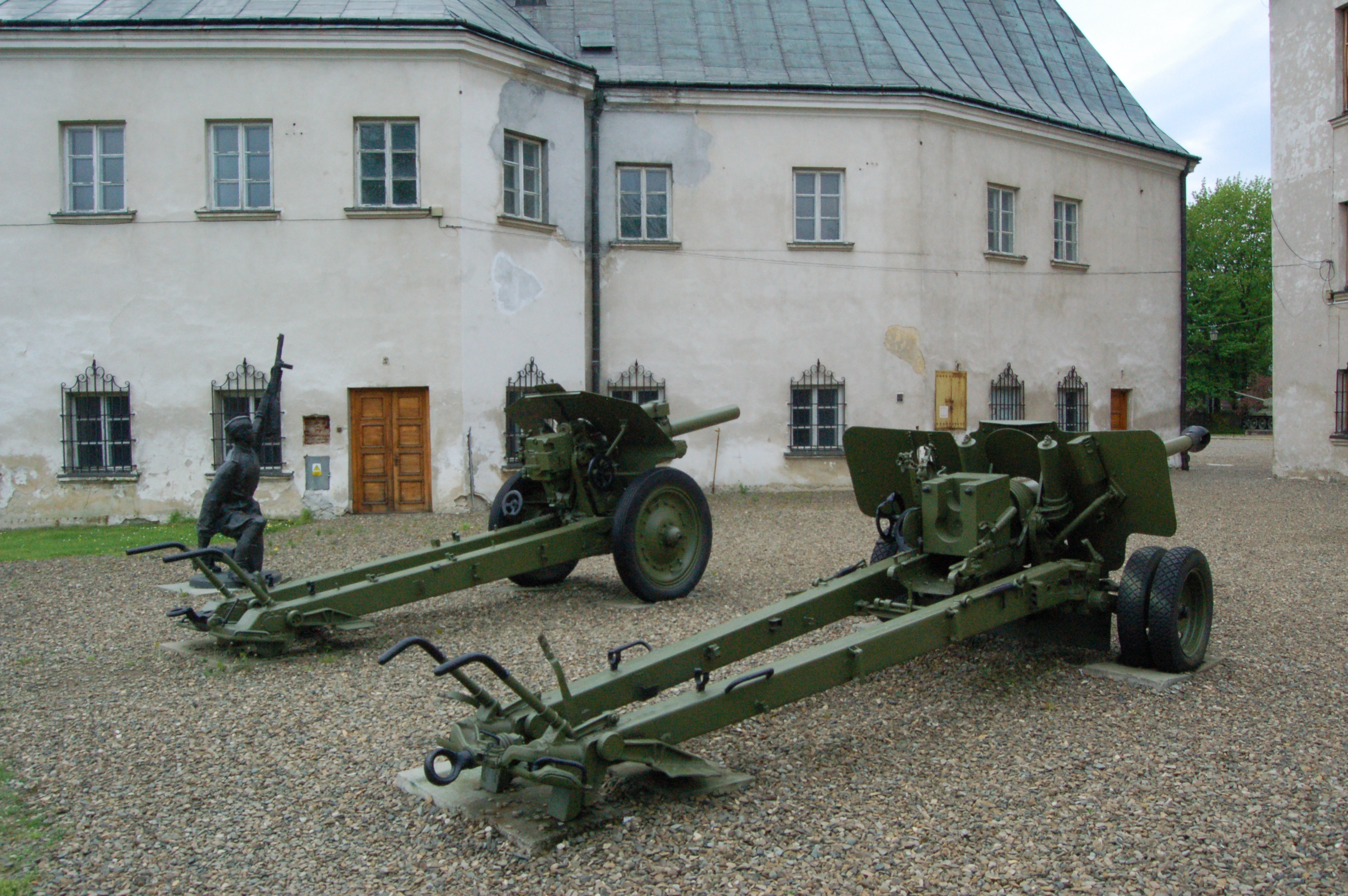
The museum exhibition was located in the courtyard

== Architecture ==
The residence consists of a palace, a southern annex, a northern annex and a palace park with a chapel and an ice house.

- Palace – a late Baroque stone and brick building on a square plan, with a two-story structure, covered with a high mansard roof. The seven-axial front (western) façade is divided by shallow avant-corps in the extreme axes and an inter-story cornice above the first floor. There are three symmetrically arranged dormers with semicircular windows on the roof. The eastern façade is smooth, five-axial, asymmetrical, with similar dormers. The northern and southern elevations are twin, symmetrical, five-axis, with an entrance on the axis and five dormers in the roof. The whole thing is topped with a cordon cornice. Inside, the building has a three-bay layout of rooms.
- The northern outbuilding – located north of the palace, frames its front elevation on the left side, on an irregular pentagonal plan, two-story, basement, covered with a hipped roof. It was built of stone and brick, with a roof covered with sheet metal. On the façades, windows of different widths are arranged on axes. The whole thing is topped with a cordon cornice. Inside, there are preserved vaults from the 17th century.
- Southern outbuilding – located south of the palace, frames its front elevation on the right side, on an irregular heptagonal plan, similar to a pentagon, two-story, basement, covered with a hipped roof. Built of stone and brick. The roof is covered with sheet metal. On the façades, windows of different widths are arranged on axes. The whole thing is topped with a cordon cornice. Inside, there are preserved vaults from the 17th century.
- Chapel – from 1925, located in the central part of the park, near its northern border. It is a rectangular building with a projection in the shorter wall. Built of stone blocks, on a plinth, with a steep, multi-slope roof. The façades are varied with the rhythm of simple pilasters, between which, in the longer walls, there are rectangular windows. The roof is accentuated with a turret topped with a spherical cupola with a cross.
- Icehouse – preserved in a rudimentary form within the park, embedded in the slope descending towards Jasiołka. It is built on a square plan, made of stone.
- Park – established around 1765, originally in the style of a French formal garden, transformed in the 19th century into a landscape park, with three ponds divided by dikes with rows of trees, mainly lindens, hornbeams and locusts. Elements of the garden architecture have been preserved: a stone bridge and garden benches.
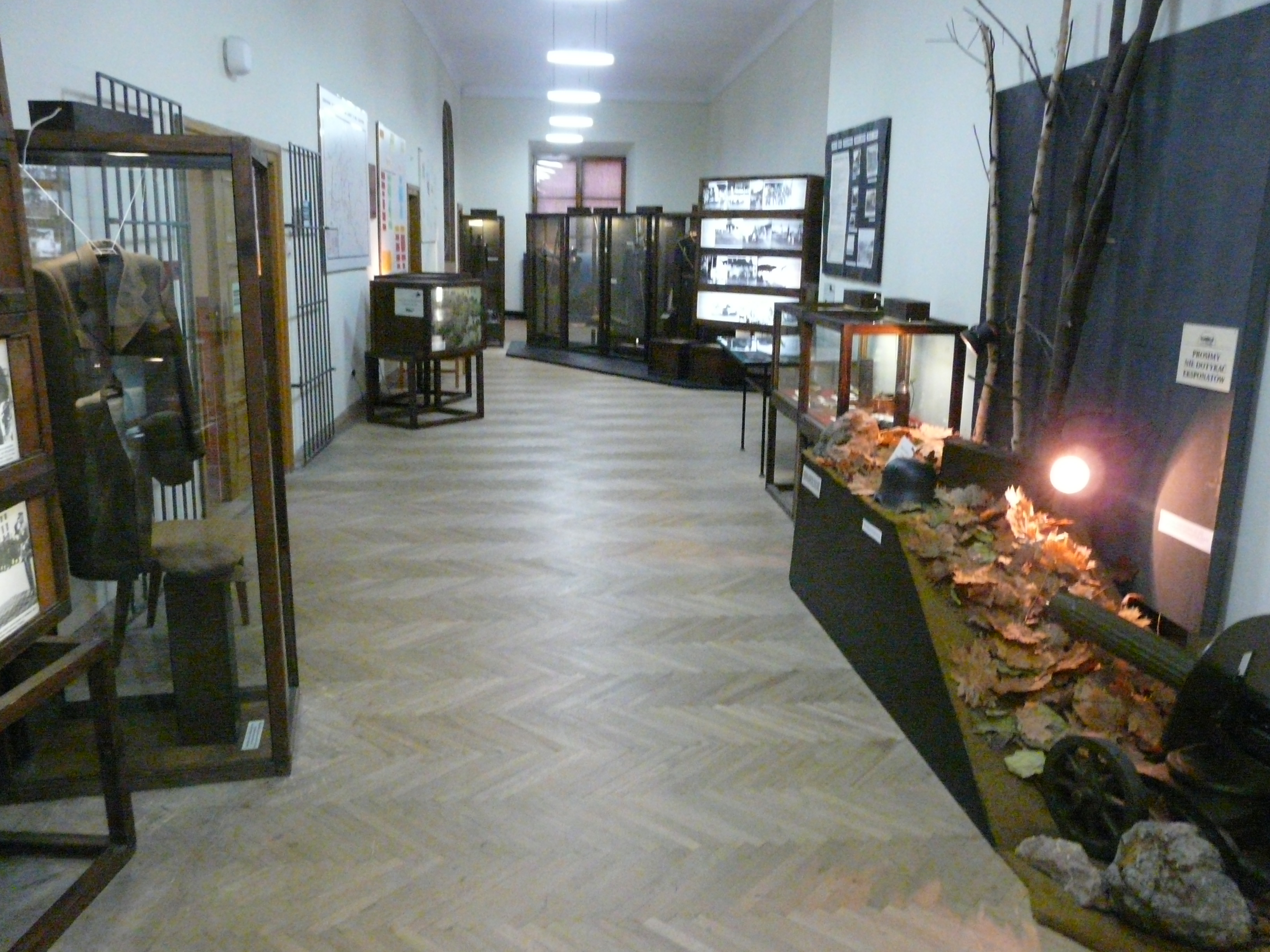
Interior of the palace (museum)

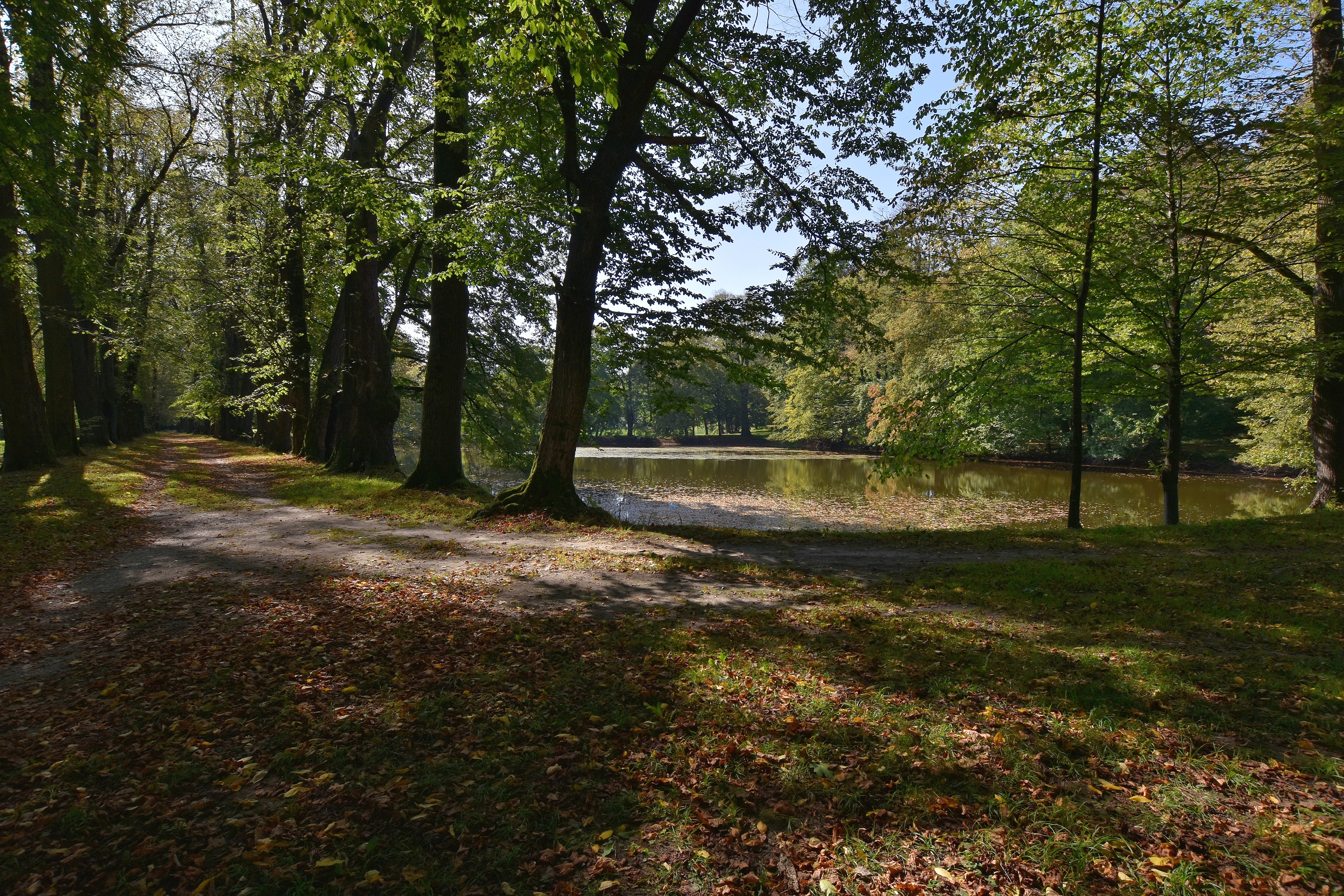
Part of the park

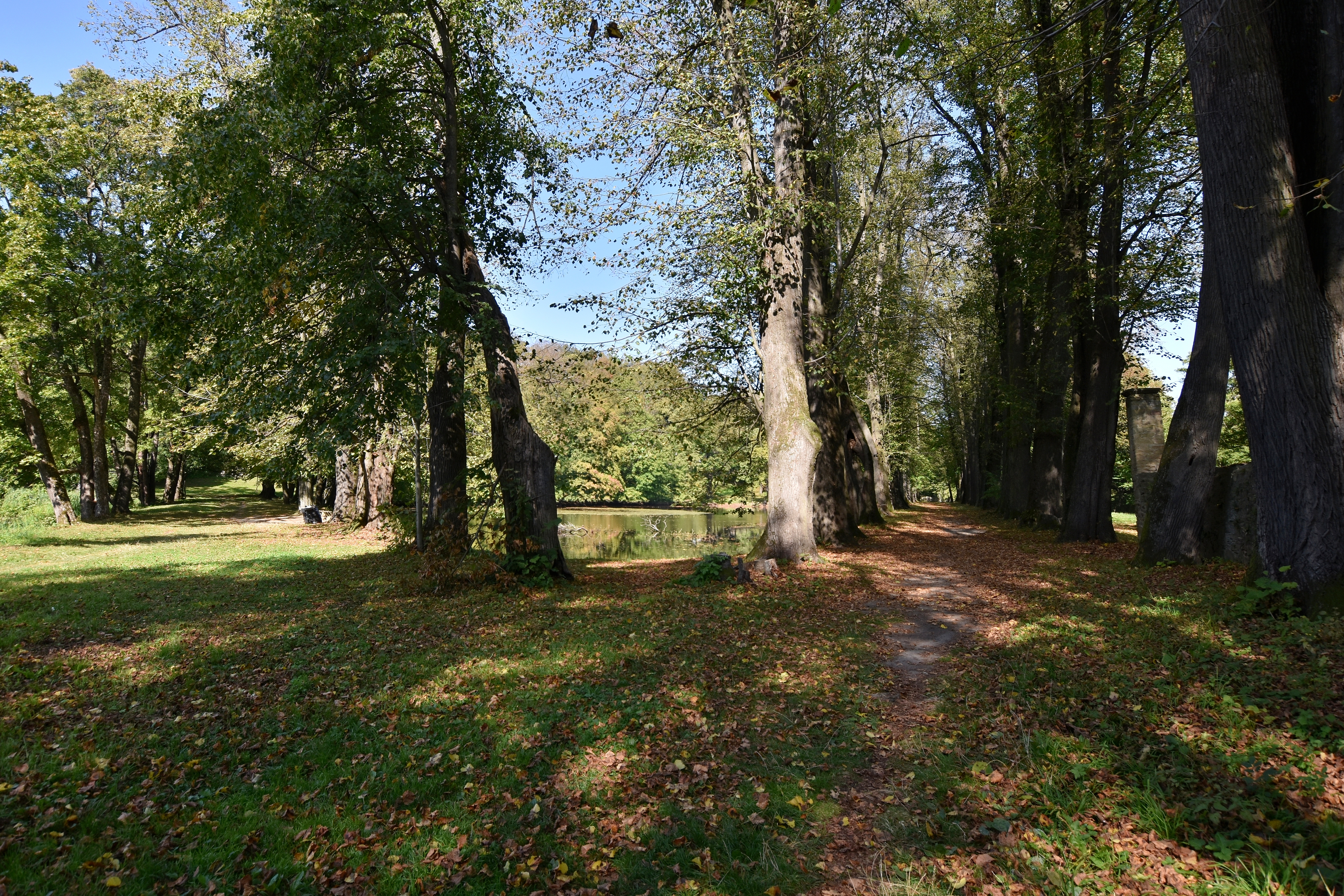
Part of the park

== Palace episodes ==
- In 1656, King John Casimir, returning to Lviv from exile in Silesia during the Swedish Deluge, stopped to rest in the palace.
- In 1755, Jerzy Mniszech founded a Masonic lodge in the palace, one of the first in Poland. Its main ideologist was Mokronowski, and its members included many aristocrats and military members.
- Maria Amalia, the second wife of Jerzy August Mniszch, was thoroughly educated, with great artistic taste, a good politician, but she was also a master of intrigues. Her ambition was to marry her daughter, only child Józefina, to Szczęsny Potocki, a borderland king and the greatest lord in Poland at that time. She was suspected of organizing the kidnapping and murder of Szczęsny's first wife, Gertruda . Shortly after this fact, Józefina became Szczęsny's wife.
- The Mniszechs supported the Bar Confederation, especially Maria Amalia, who had close contacts with Prince Karol Radziwiłł, the Bishop of Kamieniec Adam Krasiński and Kazimierz Pułaski, a frequent guest at the palace in 1769–1770. The latter organized long-distance cavalry raids from the palace in Dukla, but he failed to convince George Augustus to place his selected dragoons under Confederate command.
- In 1775, Tadeusz Kościuszko, a young graduate of the Corps of Cadets in Warsaw, came to the palace, unsuccessfully seeking Mniszech's protection in joining the Royal Saxon Army.
- A pair of storks, called "palace storks", made their nest on the chimney of the southern annex.
