= Jerzy Mniszech =

Polish nobleman and diplomat (c. 1548 – 1613)

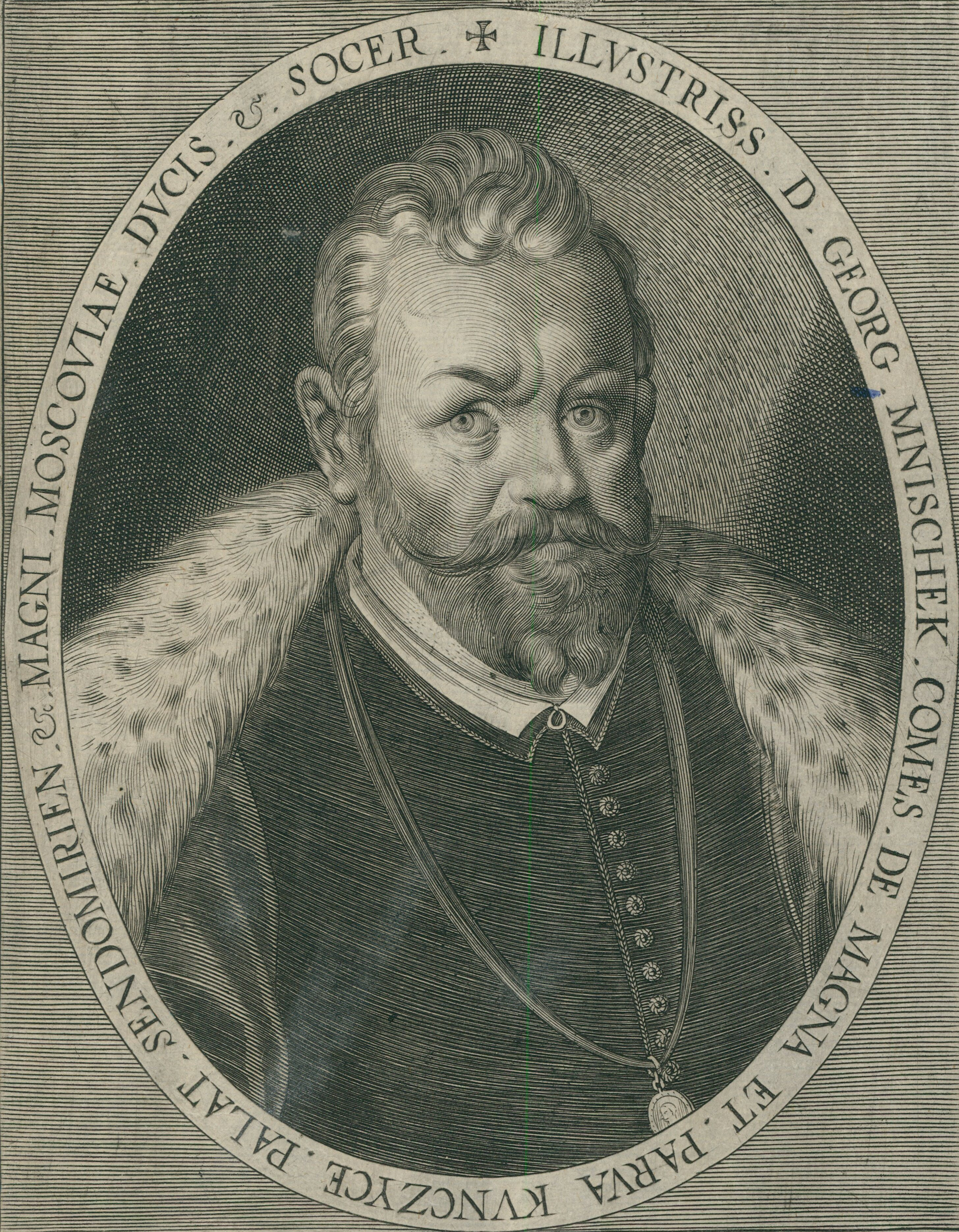
- Coat of arms: Mniszech
- Born: c. 1548
- Died: 16 May 1613
- Family: Mniszchowie
- Consort: Jadwiga Tarło
- Issue: Urszula Mniszech; Marina Mniszech; Eufrozyna Mniszech; Mikołaj Mniszech; Stanisław Bonifacy Mniszech; Stefan Jan Mniszech; Franciszek Bernard Mniszech
- Father: Mikołaj z Wielkich Kuńczyc
- Mother: Wracimowa Mniszech

Jerzy Mniszech (c. 1548 – 1613) was a Polish nobleman and diplomat in the Polish–Lithuanian Commonwealth. He was a member of the House of Mniszech. He served as krajczy koronny in 1574, castellan of Radom in 1583, voivode of Sandomierz Voivodship in 1590, starost of Lwów in 1593, and starost of Sambor, Sokal, Sanok, and Rohatyn.

== Biography ==
He was the father of Marina Mniszech, who was queen of Russia for 9 days in 1606. He dealt with providing courtisans for the courts of some Commonwealth magnates. He is known for meddling in Russia's Times of Troubles, as he wed his daughter Marina to the False Dmitri I and later convinced her to marry the False Dmitri II.

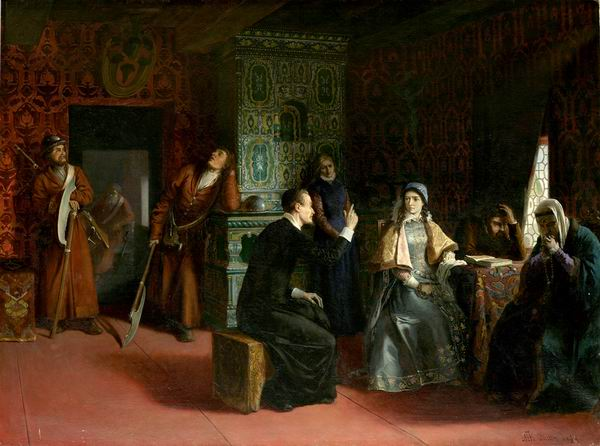
Marina Mniszech and her father Jerzy in exile at Yaroslavl, by Klodt von Urgenburg.

He had several other children:

- His daughter Urszula Mniszech, born in 1603, married prince Konstanty Wiśniowiecki, voivode of Russia (1564–1641).
- Anna Mniszech married Piotr Szyszkowski, castellan of Wojno.
- Eufrozyna Mniszech married Hermolaus Jordan.
- Mikołaj Mniszech (1587–1613) became starost of Łuków
- Stanisław Bonifacy Mniszech (died 1644) became a starost of Lwów in 1613, Sambor, Gliniany; married (1602/1603) Zofia ks. Hołowczyńska.
- Stefan Jan Mniszech became starost of Sanok.
- Franciszek Bernard Mniszech became castellan sądecki in 1638, starost of Sanock and Szczyrzyc, married Barbara Stadnicka from Nowy Żmigród.

Jerzy Mniszech is one of the personas on the painting by Jan Matejko: Kazanie Skargi (The Sermon of Piotr Skarga).

He is commemorated with a bronze bust in the Knights Hall of Warsaw Castle.

== Notes ==
1. Sources vary
