= Andrzej Jerzy Mniszech =

Polish painter and art collector (1823–1905)

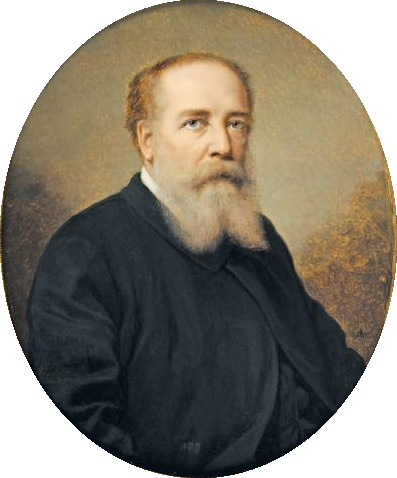
- Self-portrait, 1895
- Born: 21 November 1823; Vyshnivets
- Died: 11 May 1905 (aged 81); Paris

Count Andrzej Jerzy Mniszech (1823–1905) was a Polish nobleman, landowner, painter and art collector.

== Early life ==
His was born as the younger son of Count Karol Filip Wandalin Mniszech (1794–1844), and his wife, Countess Eleonora Cetner (1798–1871). His paternal grandfather was Count Michał Jerzy Mniszech, a Polish nobleman who was Grand Marshal of the Crown during the reign of Stanisław II Augustus.

== Biography ==
He spent his youth in the family palace in Wiśniowiec and in Paris. In 1846 he inherited a lot of debt, and when he moved with his wife, Countess Anna Elżbieta Potocka (1827–1885) and their son Leon (1849–1901) to Paris in 1854, he took with him a large part of the private family collection from Wiśniowiec, especially paintings. The palace the couple acquired in 1861 at 16 Rue Daru in Paris was owned by his wife, and after her death in 1885, it passed to their son Leon. The entire collection counted about 500 paintings, engravings, drawings, ceramics and furniture. Mniszech collected mainly Dutch masters of the 17th century and French art of the Rococo period. He was one of the first amateur collectors of Frans Hals. The collection was dispersed twice: in 1902 following his son Leon's death, and in 1910 when the collection went up for auction.

He was active in Paris during the years 1854–1905. He started drawing lessons with his elder brother, Count Jerzy Wandalin Mniszech (1822-1881), in Wiśniowiec. In the 1860s he continued in Paris, studying with Jean Gigoux and Leon Cogniet. He painted mainly portraits often using the triptych form. In October 2007 his painting, Portrait of a Geisha, sold in Sotheby's, New York, for $85,000.
