= Urszula Zamoyska =

Polish noblewoman and socialite

Ursula Mniszek
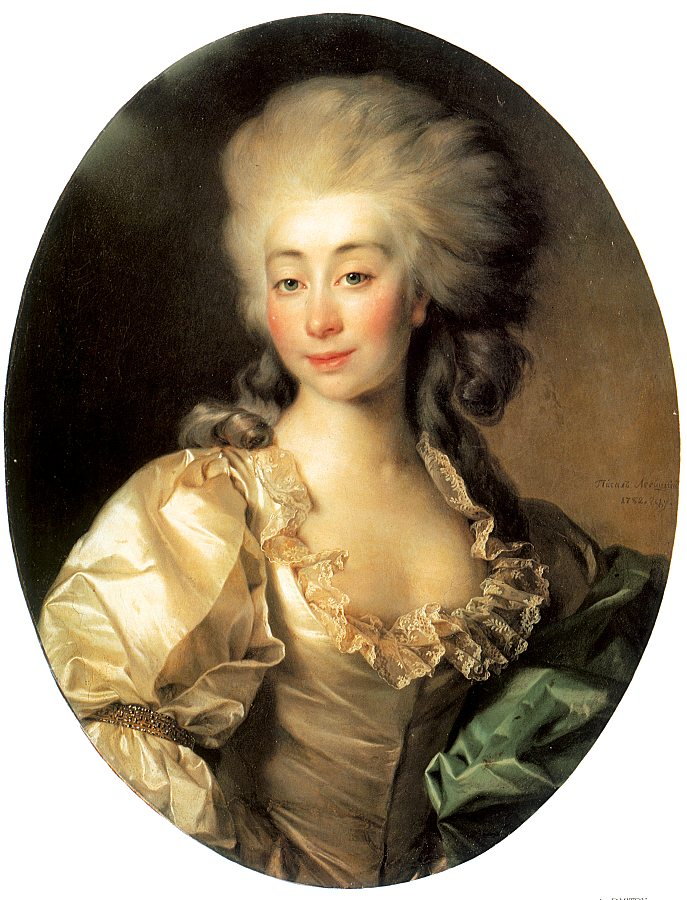
- Portrait by Dmitry Levitzky
- Born: c. 1750
- Died: 1808
- Noble family: Zamoyski
- Spouses: Wincenty Potocki; Michał Jerzy Mniszech
- Issue: Karol Filip Wandalin Mniszech; Pauline Constance, Gräfin Mniszechówna
- Father: Jan Jakub Zamoyski
- Mother: Ludwika Maria Poniatowska

Urszula Zamoyska (c. 1750–1808), was a Polish noblewoman and socialite, niece of king Stanisław August Poniatowski. She is known for her public role during the reign of her uncle, when she played the ceremonial role of the hostess of his court.

== Life ==
She was the daughter of Ludwika Maria Poniatowska and Jan Jakub Zamoyski. Her parents separated shortly after her birth. In 1763, her maternal uncle, Stanisław August Poniatowski, was elected king of Poland. In 1773, she married Count Wincenty Potocki (d. 1825). Her marriage was discontinued by a divorce in 1777. According to the diary of the king, the fault was with her spouse. Her divorce was subject to a poem by Ignacy Potocki. Grigory Potemkin presented a marriage proposal, but the king did not support it. She married secondly to Michal Jerzy Mniszech in 1781.

=== Hostess of the Royal Court ===
She played a significant role during the last two decades of her uncle's reign. As the king was unmarried and there was no queen, his favorite niece Urszula Zamoyska often played a ceremonial role by his side, and accompanied him in public. The king reportedly had the palace in Dęblin remade for her.

In October 1781, the meeting between the king and the heir to the Russian throne, Grand Duke Paul, took place in her palace in Wiśniowiec in Wołyń in her presence, during which she was given a portrait encrusted with diamonds by the Grand Duchess Maria; she herself visited Saint Petersburg a few months later. Described as a haughty beauty, she played the role of hostess at the royal court of king Stanisław and was a leading figure in the aristocratic high society life of Warsaw. She formed a theatrical society which staged plays at court consisting of amateur actors from the nobility.

She had a good relationship with the Russian ambassador Stackelberg, and arranged a reception for him on his arrival in Poland. In 1787, she accompanied her uncle the king to his meeting with empress Catherine the Great in Kaniów, during which she was given the Order of St. Catherine on 20 March. On their return to Poland, she was the hostess on the king's meeting with emperor Joseph II, during which she staged plays and ballets for his amusement. During the Great Sejm (1787–1791), Julian Ursyn Niemcewicz's political comedy, The Return of the Deputy (1790), was performed in her salon.

In the spring of 1791, she and her mother visited Paris during a difficult period in Poland, which attracted bad publicity. During the crisis of 1793, she and her spouse left for Grodno. Reportedly the Russian ambassador Jacob Sievers threatened to have her property, which was now situated in the Russian sector of Poland, confiscated, which contributed to the king giving in to Russian demands. During the crisis of 1794, it was noted that she and her spouse had plans to evacuate to Königsberg, though it is unconfirmed if they did leave.

=== Later life ===
On 7 January 1795, she and her family joined king Stanisław in Grodno, and remained by his side during the Third Partition of Poland. Reportedly, she and her mother, along with their coterie and urged by the Russian N. Repnin, contributed to persuade the king to sign his abdication on 25 November, as they feared that his refusal would lead to a Russian confiscation of their property and their ruin.

After the abdication on 25 November 1795, the confiscation of the Mniszch property and her palace in Dęblin was lifted, which she could control herself after having visited her property on the summer of 1796. On the mission of Repnin, she was also given the task to persuade Józef Poniatowski to join them in exile in Russia. In February 1797, she followed her uncle, the deposed king, to St Petersburg. She participated in the coronation of Paul I, was given the honorary rank of Imperial Portrait Lady of the Russian court, and was celebrated by the Russian aristocracy.

After the death of her uncle the former king in 1798, Urszula Zamoyska returned to Poland and settled with her spouse in Wiśniowiec. After being widowed in 1806, she lived in Vienna and Paris.

== Legacy ==
She was subject of many Latin poems by nuncio AM Durini, and the "Czestochowa Song" by Celestyna Czaplica.

She described the 1787 journey to Kaniów to her mother, and her letter was published in French by Andrzej Edward Koźmian (it was also published in Russian by P. Saweljew in 1843).
