= Józefina Amalia Mniszech =

Polish noblewoman (1752–1798)

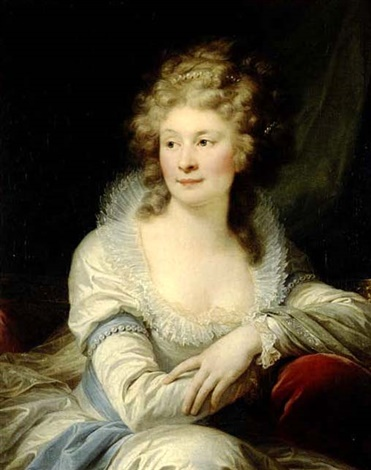
- Coat of arms: Mniszech
- Born: 28 August 1752; Krakov
- Died: 1 October 1798 (aged 46); Saint Petersburg
- Family: Mniszech
- Consort: Stanisław Szczęsny Potocki
- Issue: Pelagia Róża Potocka; Szczęsny Jerzy Potocki; Witoria Potocka; Ludwika Potocka; Róża Potocka; Konstancja Potocka; Stanisław Potocki; Oktawia Potocka; Jarosław Potocki; Włodzimierz Potocki; Idalia Potocka
- Father: Jerzy August Mniszech
- Mother: Maria Amalia von Brühl

Countess Józefina Amalia Mniszech (1752–1798) was a Polish noblewoman, State Lady, Dame of the Order of Saint Catherine, amateur painter, and art collector.

== Early life ==
By birth a member of the House of Mniszech, she was born as the only child of Court Marshal Jerzy August Mniszech and Countess Maria Amelia Friederike von Brühl, and the granddaughter of Heinrich von Brühl.

On 1 December 1774 Józefina Amalia was married in Dukla to Count Stanisław Szczęsny Potocki, member of the House of Potocki on the behest of her parents. They had eleven children, only eight of whom reached adulthood. As a dowry, Mniszech received Vyalikaya Byerastavitsa. The couple lived in Tulchyn where she had eleven children, however the paternity of the younger children is in doubt as they didn't live together after 1787.

Józefina Amalia was known in society for her beauty, cheer, ambition, and conversation, which did not always follow etiquiette of the time. She took lovers both before and during the marriage. Jozef Klembowski who managed the Potocki residence could be the father of some of her children. Her later lovers include the Colonel of the Targowicki Regiment, Dzierżański, who is assumed to be the father of her youngest daughter, Idalia, and the Commander of the Court Police in Tulchyn, Tadeusz Mossakowski.

Countess Potocka enjoyed the favour of Catherine the Great, who granted her the title of Lady of State in 1792, and in 1793, bestowed upon her the Order of Saint Catherine of the Grand Cross.

1791, Stanisław Potocki expressed his desire to legally marry Countess Sophia Witt, but Józefina Amalia, who was backed by the Empress, refused to grant him a divorce. On 23 May 1792, Potocki entered into an arrangement with his wife, where he transferred his estates and the custody of their children to her, in return she pledged to pay him 50 thousand gallons per year. Following this, he left with Countess Witt and they lived in Hamburg for two and a half years.

Józefina Amalia left the management of her property to the discretion of the stewards and continued to live in Saint Petersburg, participating is society and refusing to send her husband a single penny.

In 1796 Potocki returned to Russia and with difficulty managed to break the arrangement. Józefina Amalia agreed to a divorce only after Catherine II had died. The episcopal court in Kamianets-Podilskyi announced the divorce in the beginning of 1798. However the same year, Józefina Amalia unexpectedly died in her St. Petersburg house on the Fontanka at the age of 46, leaving behind many children "products of years and leisure" as she herself said.
