= Michał Jerzy Mniszech =

Polish nobleman (1748–1806)

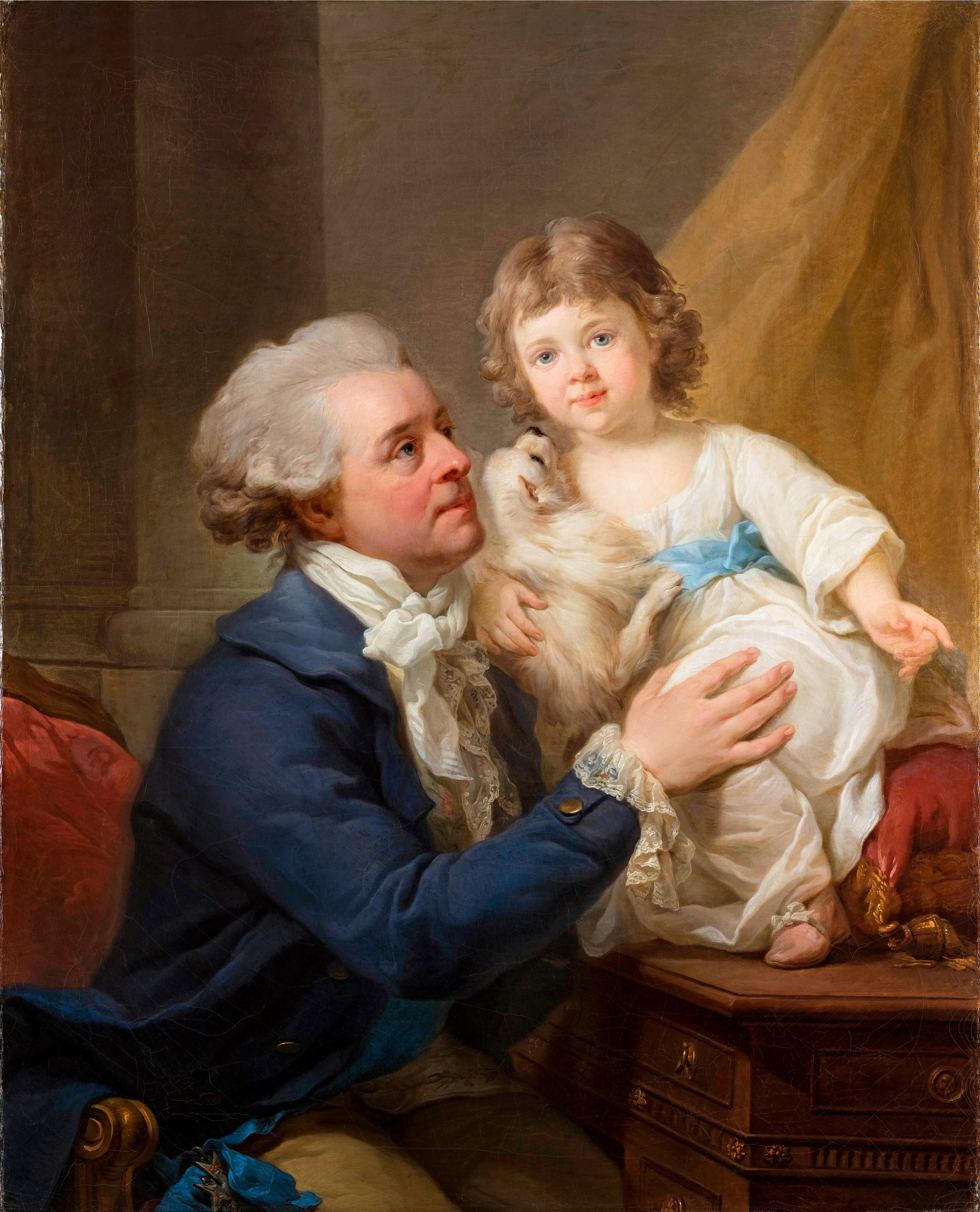
- Portrait with daughter Elżbieta, by Marcello Bacciarelli, 1795

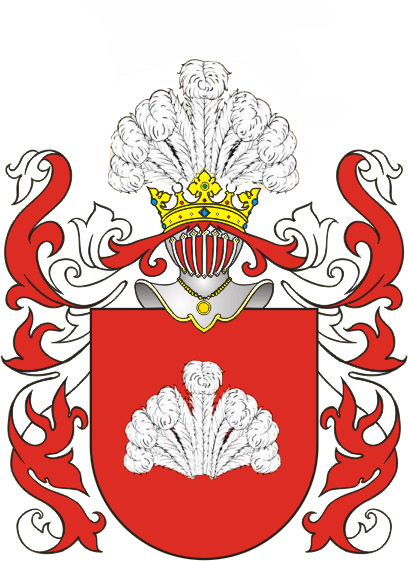
- Coat of arms: Mniszech
- Born: 1742; Wiśniowiec, Volhynian Voivodeship
- Died: 14 March 1806
- Family: Mniszchowie
- Consort: Pelagia Teresa Potocka; Urszula Zamoyska
- Issue: with Urszula Zamoyska; Izabella Mniszech; Paulina Mniszech
- Father: Jan Karol Mniszech
- Mother: Katarzyna Zamoyska

Count Michał Jerzy Wandalin Mniszech (1748–1806) was a Polish nobleman.

Michal became Colonel in 1757, Crown Cupbearer in 1777, Lithuanian Grand Secretary in 1778, Chief of the Royal Chancellery in 1780. He served also as Lithuanian Court Marshal from 1781 until 1783 and Crown Grand Marshal from 1783 until 1793. In 1797 he was appointed Privy Councillor of state by Paul I. He was starosta of Lublin, Jawor, Słonim and Rostoki.

As one of the senators he participated in the Great Sejm.

== Awards ==
- Knight of the Order of the White Eagle

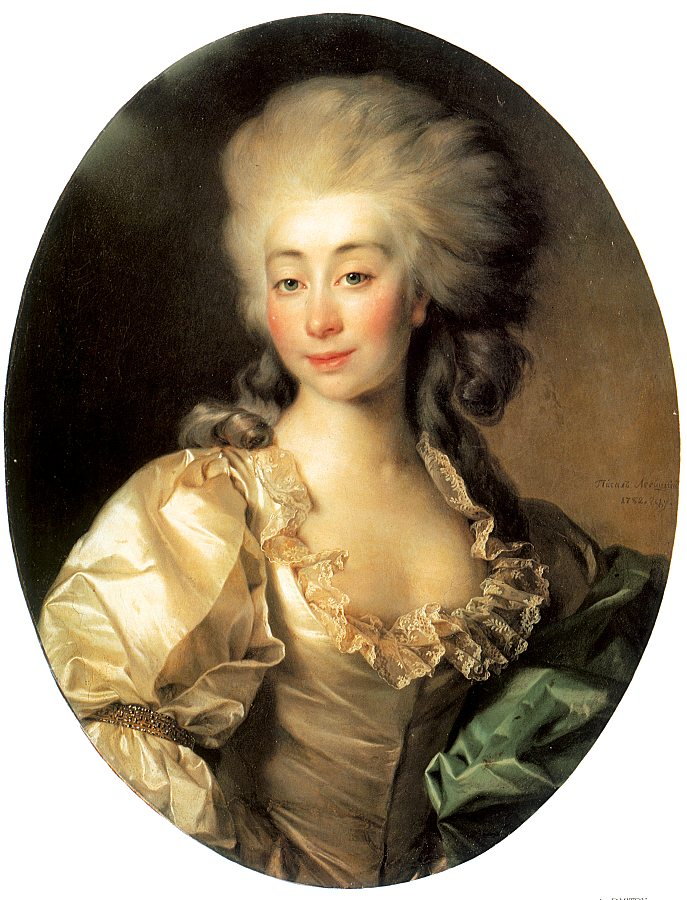
His wife, Urszula Zamoyska by Dmitri Levitsky.
