= Wincenty Potocki =

Polish general statesman

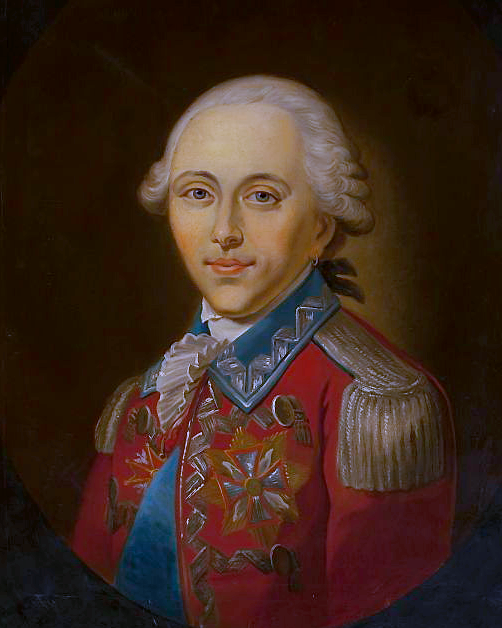
- Coat of arms: Piława
- Born: 1740
- Died: 1825 (aged 84–85)
- Noble family: Potocki
- Spouses: Hélène Massalska; Urszula Zamoyska
- Father: Stanisław Potocki
- Mother: Helena Zamoyska

Wincenty Potocki was a Polish general, statesman and magnate. He was the royal court chamberlain from 1773 to 1794 and a lieutenant general from 1773. He was awarded the Order of Saint Stanislaus and the Order of the White Eagle He was married to Urszula Zamoyska and then later to Hélène Massalska.
