= Maria Amalia Mniszech =

Polish-Saxon noblewoman (1736–1772)

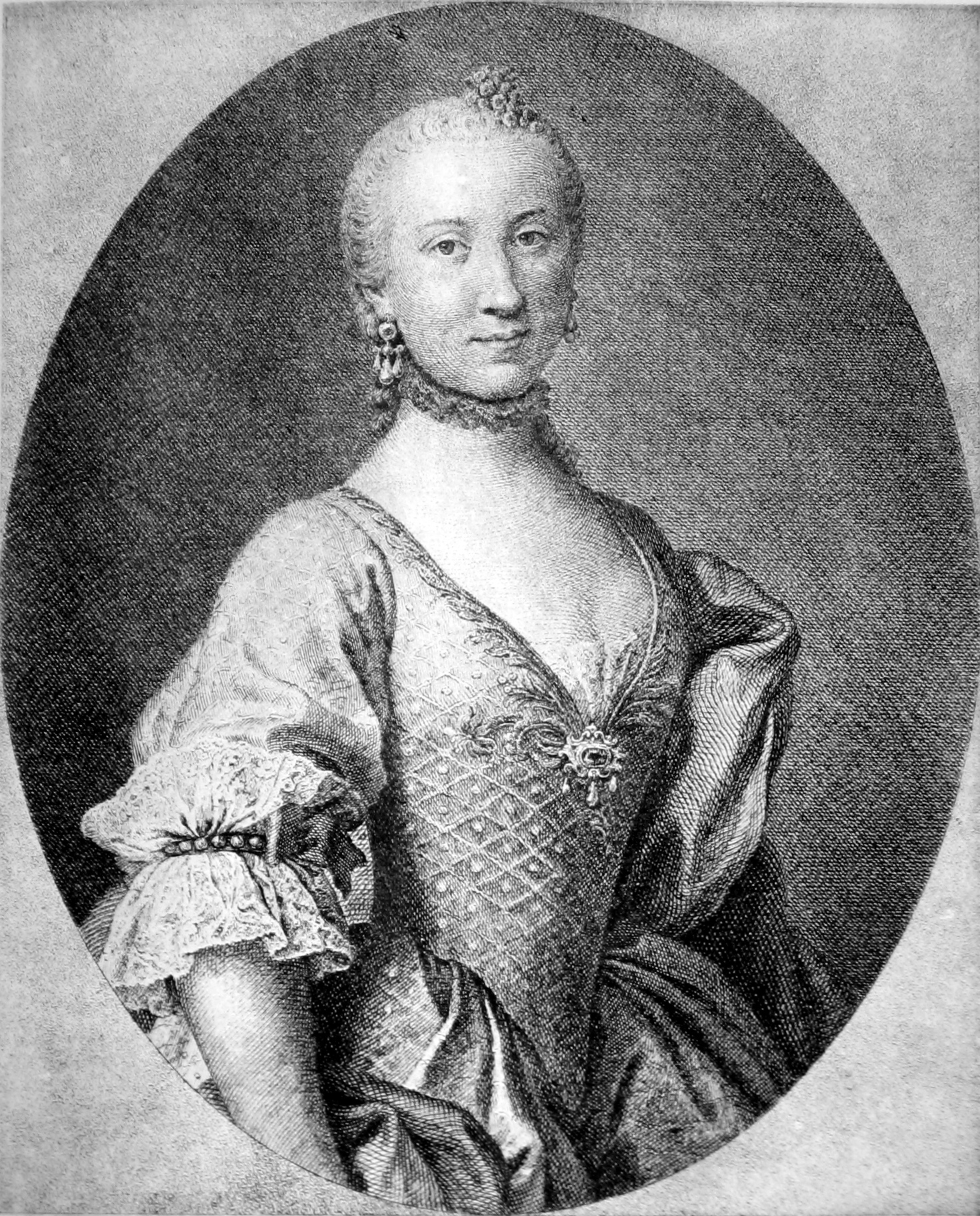
- Mniszech in 1785

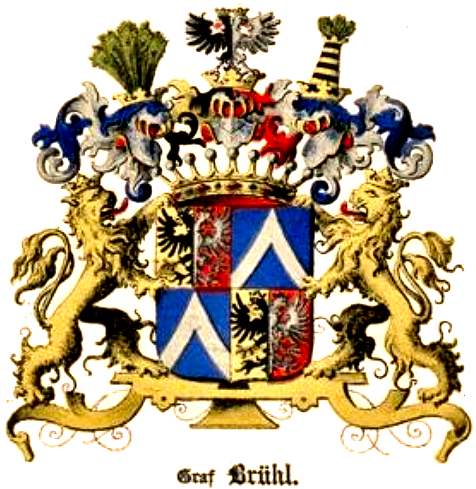
- Coat of arms
- Born: 10 July 1736
- Died: 30 April 1772 (aged 35); Dukla
- Family: Mniszech née von Brühl
- Consort: Jerzy August Mniszech
- Issue: Józefina Amalia Mniszech
- Father: Heinrich von Brühl
- Mother: Countess Franziska von Kolowrat-Krakowska

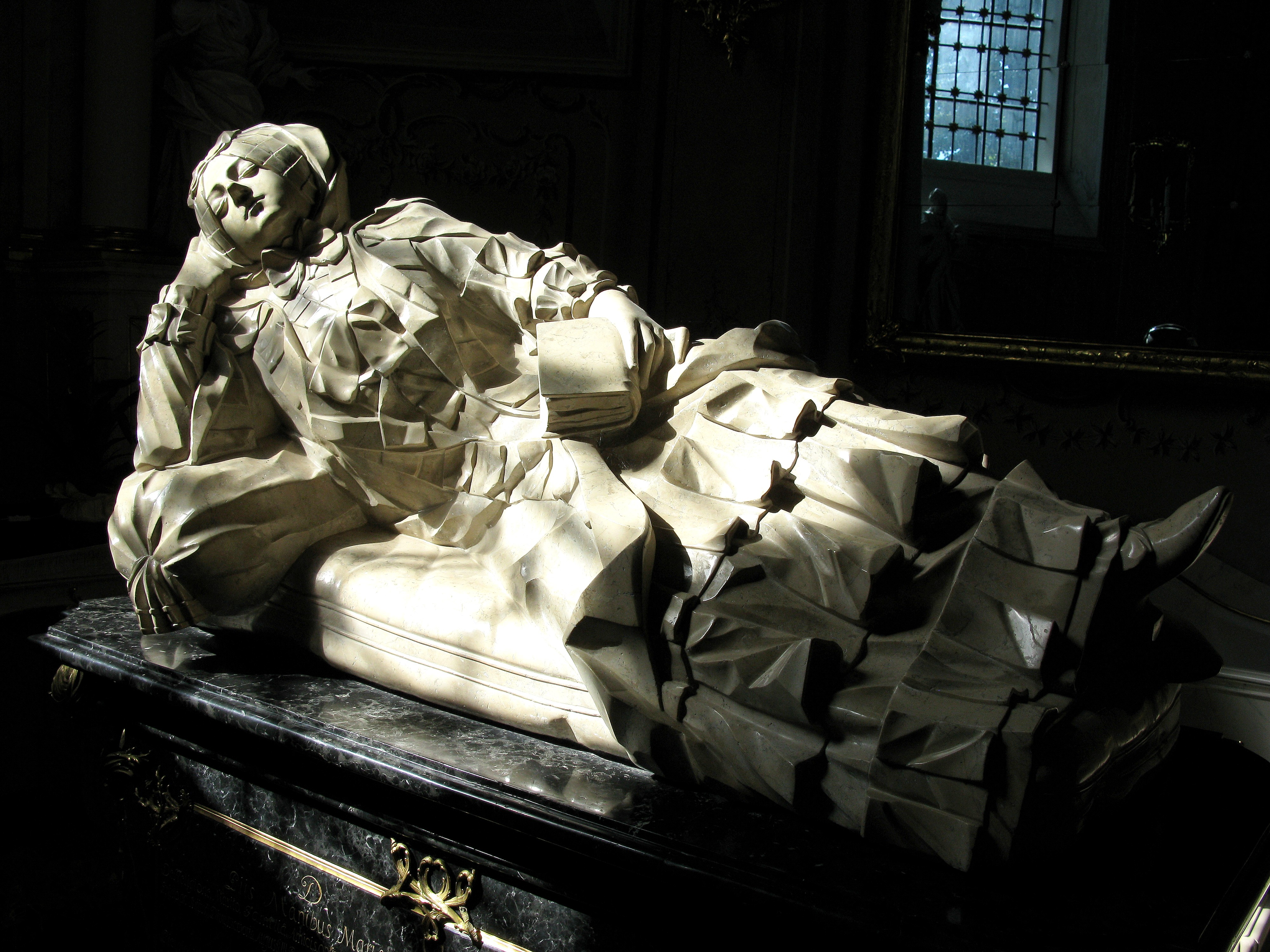
Effigy of Maria Amalia Mniszech in Saint Mary Magdalene Church in Dukla

Countess Maria Amalia Mniszech (1736–1772), née Countess von Brühl, was a Polish-Saxon noblewoman and lady-in-waiting. She was active as a political Polish agent in the court of Empress Maria Theresa in Vienna, where she was sent to influence the empress in favour of Poland.

== Life ==
Maria Amalia Friederike was born as the eldest child and only daughter of Count Heinrich von Brühl and his wife, Countess Franziska von Kolowrat-Krakowska (1717–1762).

Carefully educated at great expense under the tutelage of Maria Josepha of Austria, she spoke six languages. From an early age, she participated in court intrigues in Warsaw at the court of Augustus III of Poland, as well as at the royal courts in Dresden and Paris, before eagerly being sent by her father to the court of Maria Theresa in Vienna.

As a lady-in-waiting to Maria Teresa, she often tried to interest the empress in Polish affairs, and on 14 September 1750 she was awarded the Order of the Starry Cross. After the death of August III (1763), she left Saxony and divided her time between Dukla and Warsaw. In June 1764, while in Dukla the Mniszechs funded the construction of the Bernardine church. In 1769, during the Bar Confederation, Maria Amalia funded the construction of a stone chapel in the village of Trzciana at the site of the Hermitage of St. John of Dukla.

On 13 February 1771, Maria Amalia Mniszech was accused of organizing, together with the Potocki family, the assassination of Gertruda Komorowska, the first wife of the then 18-year-old Stanisław Szczęsny Potocki. Potocki had eloped with Komorowska, despite being betrothed to Maria Amalia's only daughter, Józefina Amalia Mniszech.

Maria Amalia died of tuberculosis at the age of 35 according to the family's official account. Suspicions abounded, however, that she had poisoned herself for fear of being sued by the Czartoryski family for the murder of Gertruda Komorowska. Two years after her death, her daughter Józefina Amalia Mniszech married Stanisław Szczęsny Potocki, finally fulfilling her wishes. She is buried in the Rococo St. Mary Magdalene Church in Dukla.

In 1773, Jerzy Mniszech erected a Rococo tomb by Jan Obrocki of Lwów in the chapel of the Dukla parish church of St. Mary Magdalene. The chapel is designed as a Rococo boudoir, her sarcophagus is carved from black and white marble and depicts the deceased in court dress, her head resting on one hand and a book in the other, as if she were dozing. Her epitaph was written by Rafał Modlibowski. In Warsaw, in the church of St. Antoni Padewski on Senatorska Street also has the epitaph for the two wives of court marshal Jerzy Mniszech, including "Maria Amalia née von Brühl".[2] There's also a plaque commemorating Maria Amalia Mniszech in the Franciscan church in Sanok, as well as the Franciscan church in Biecz, St. John the Baptist Church in Kobylanka, and the St. Catherine of Alexandria Church in Jaśliska.

== Personal life ==
On 29 April 1734 she married Count Jerzy August Mniszech (1715-1778), the owner of the Dukla estate. They had one daughter:

- Countess Józefina Amalia Mniszech (29 August 1752 - October 1798), amateur painter, and a collector of art.
