= Mniszech family =

Polish noble family

Coat of arms of Mniszech family

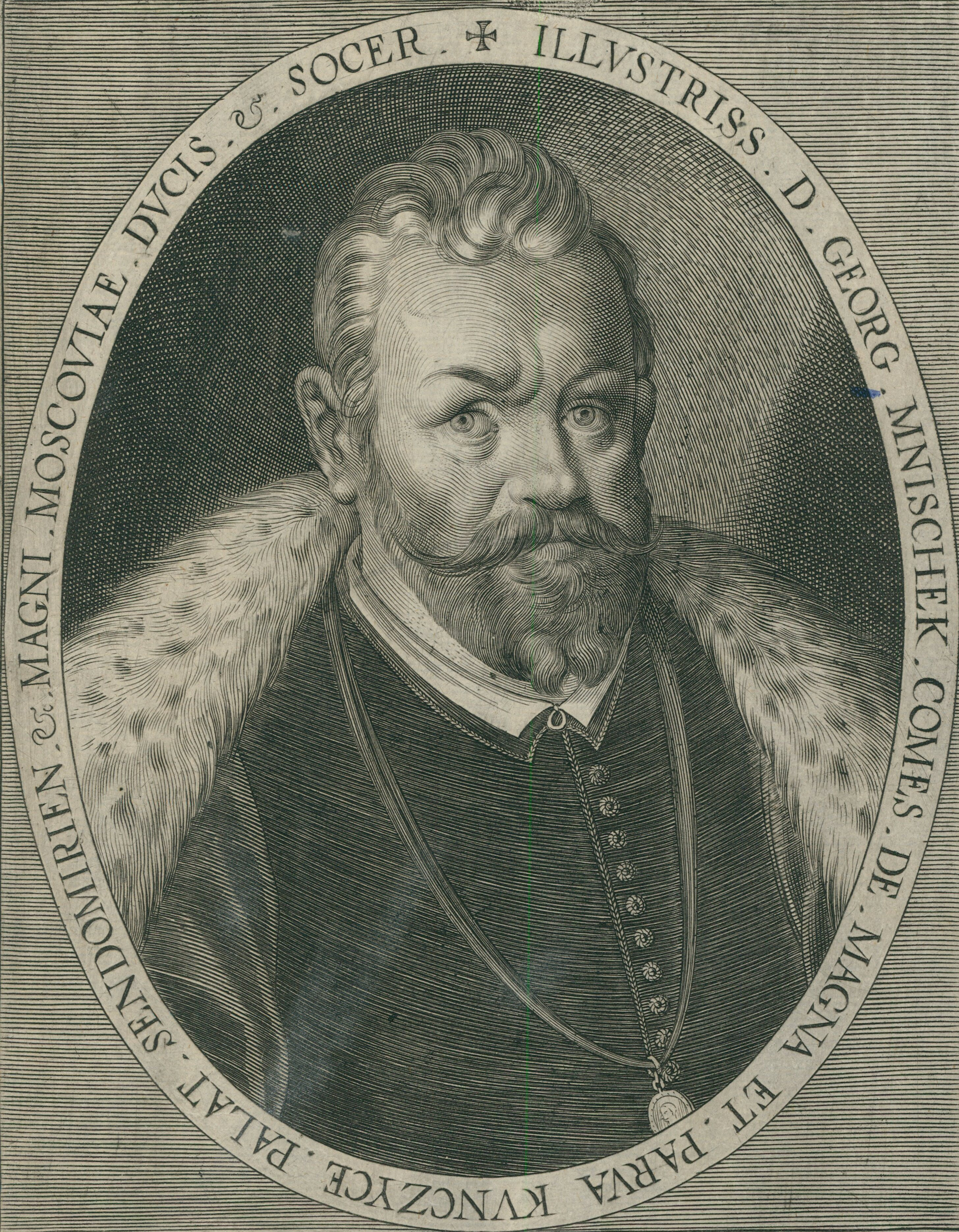
Jerzy Mniszech.

The House of Mniszech (plural: Mniszchowie, historical feminine forms: Mniszchówna (unmarried), Mniszchowa (married or widow)) was a Polish magnate and noble family bearing the Mniszech Coat of Arms.

== Notable members ==
- Andrzej Jerzy Mniszech (1823–1905), painter
- Barbara Mniszech (died c. 1569)
- Franciszek Bernard Mniszech
- Jan Karol Wandalin Mniszech
- Jan Mniszech
- Jerzy August Mniszech
- Jerzy Jan Wandalin Mniszech
- Jerzy Mniszech (c. 1548–1613), starost of Lwów, voivode of Sandomierz
- Julia Teresa Wandalin-Mniszech
- Józef Jan Wandalin Mniszech
- Józef Wandalin Mniszech
- Józefina Amalia Mniszech (1752–1798), wife of Stanisław Szczęsny Potocki
- Ludwika Mniszech
- Maria Amalia Mniszchowa (1736–1772)
- Maryna Mniszchówna (c. 1588–1614), Tsaritsa of Russia
- Michał Jerzy Wandalin Mniszech (1742–1806), Marshal of the Court of Lithuania and Grand Marshal of the Crown
- Mikołaj Mniszech (1484–1553)
- Stanisław Bonifacy Mniszech
- Stanisław Jerzy Wandalin Mniszech
- Urszula Mniszchówna

== Palaces ==
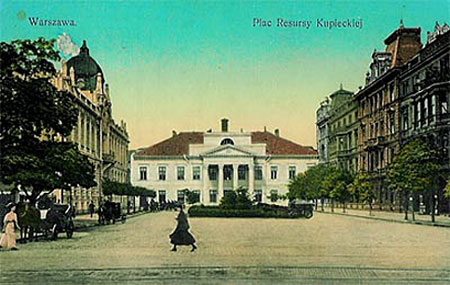
Mniszech Palace in Warsaw

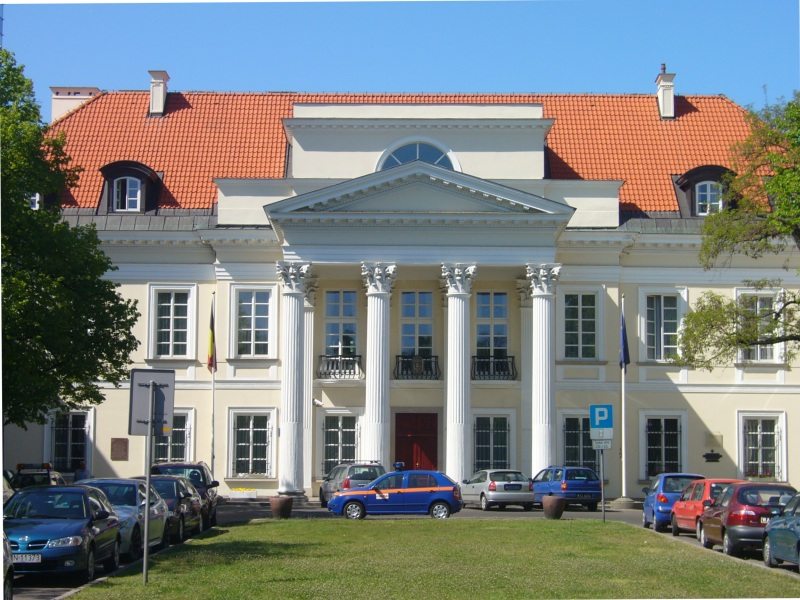
Mniszech Palace in Warsaw

== Bibliography ==
- Kossakowski S. K., 1860, Monografie historyczno-genealogiczne niektórych rodzin polskich, t. 2, Warszawa.
- Leitgeber S., 1993, Nowy Almanach Błękitny, Oficyna Wydawnicza „Audiutor”, Poznań-Warszawa.
- Zielińska T, 1997, Poczet polskich rodów arystokratycznych, WSiP, Warszawa.
