= Kończyc III coat of arms =

Polish coat of arms

Mniszech
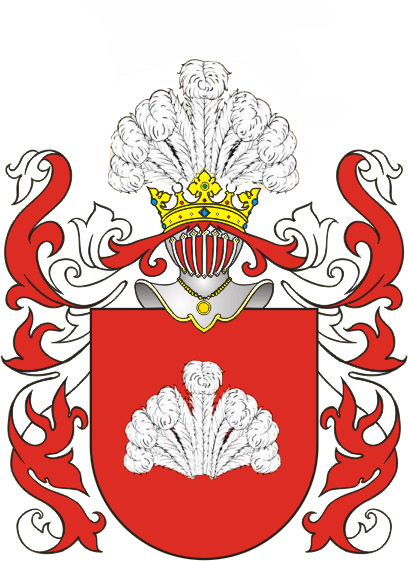
- Alternative name: Kończyc
- Families: Mniszech

Kończyc III, also known as Mniszech, is a Polish coat of arms. It was used by the Mniszech family in the times of the Polish–Lithuanian Commonwealth.

== Notable bearers ==
Notable bearers of this coat of arms include:

- Mniszech family

== See also ==
- Polish heraldry
- Heraldry
- Coat of arms
- List of Polish nobility coats of arms

== Sources ==
- Kasper Niesiecki, Herbarz Polski, wyd. J.N. Bobrowicz, Lipsk 1839-1845
