= Doły Jasielsko-Sanockie =

The Jasielsko-Sanockie Pits
- Polish: Doły Jasielsko-Sanockie
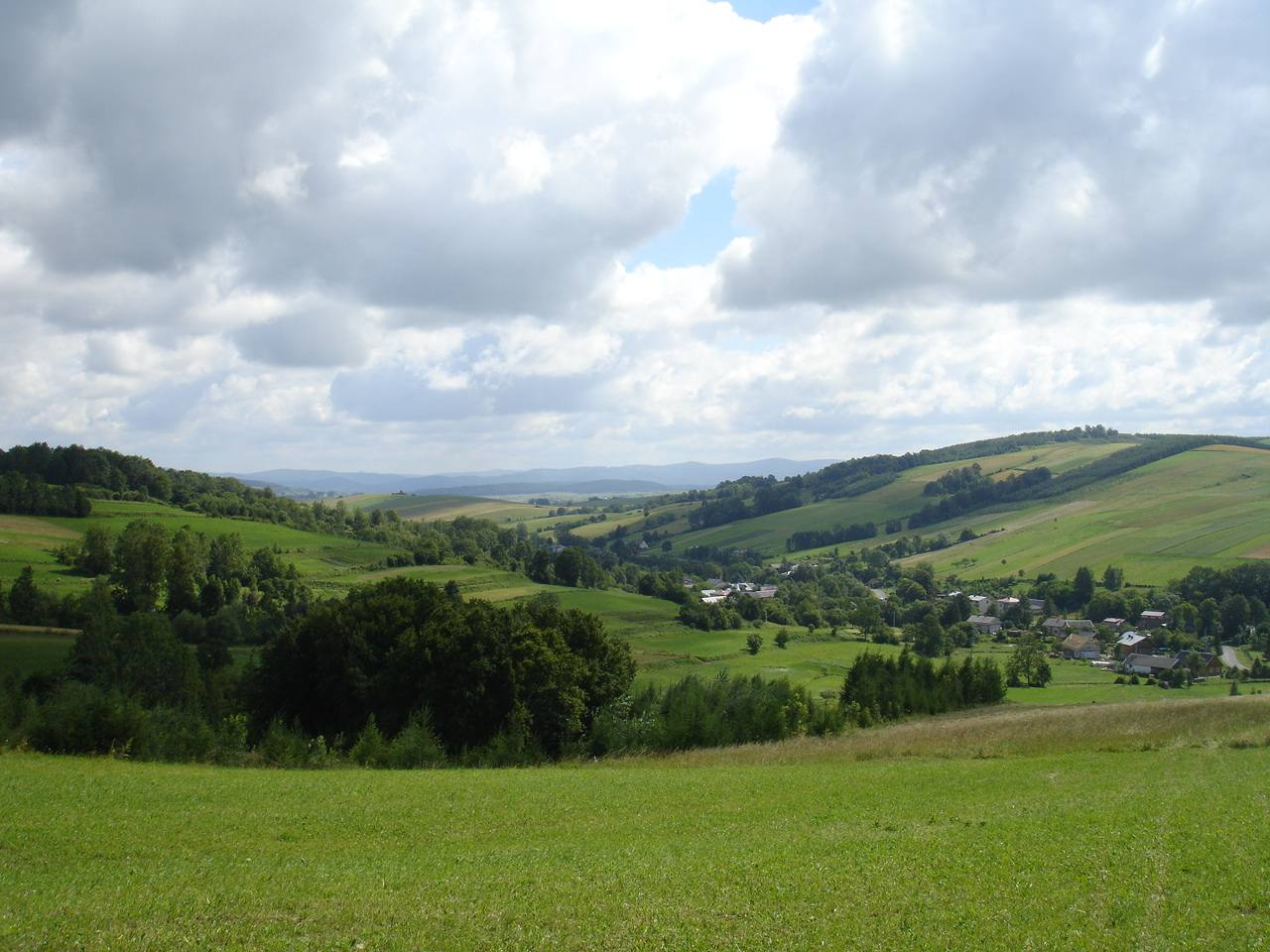
- A view from Bukowica Peak in western Nowotaniec.

Highest point
- Peak: Dział (peak)
- Elevation: 678 m (2,224 ft)
- Coordinates: 49°29′00″N 22°40′04″E

Dimensions
- Length: 100 km (62 mi) west-east
- Width: 18–20 km (11–12 mi) north-south
- Area: 1,200 km^{2} (460 mi^{2})

Geography
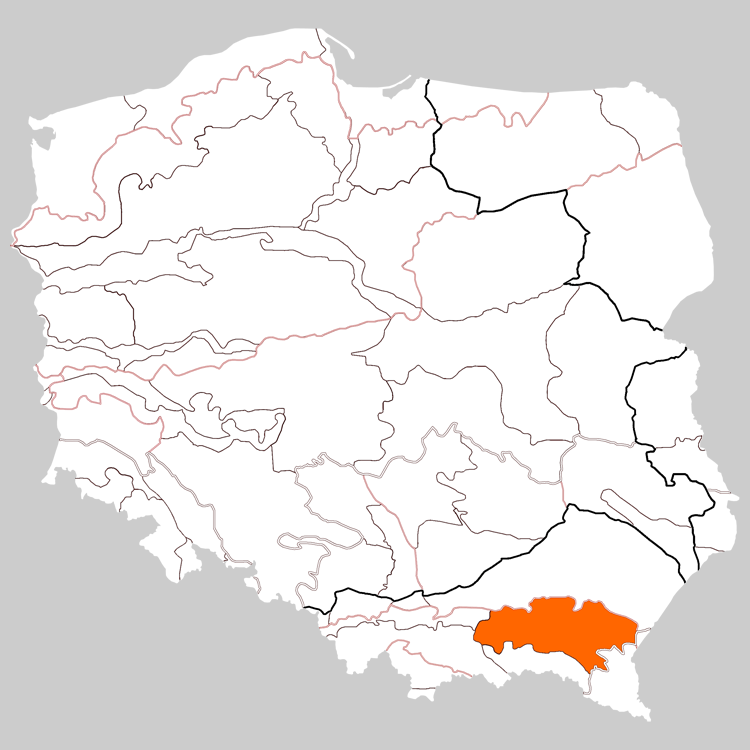
- Country: Poland
- Parent range: Central Beskidian Piedmont in Sanok County, Krosno County, Jasło County, Gorlice County,
- Borders on: Bieszczady Mountains, and Low Beskids

Geology
- Rock type(s): granite, gneiss, limestone

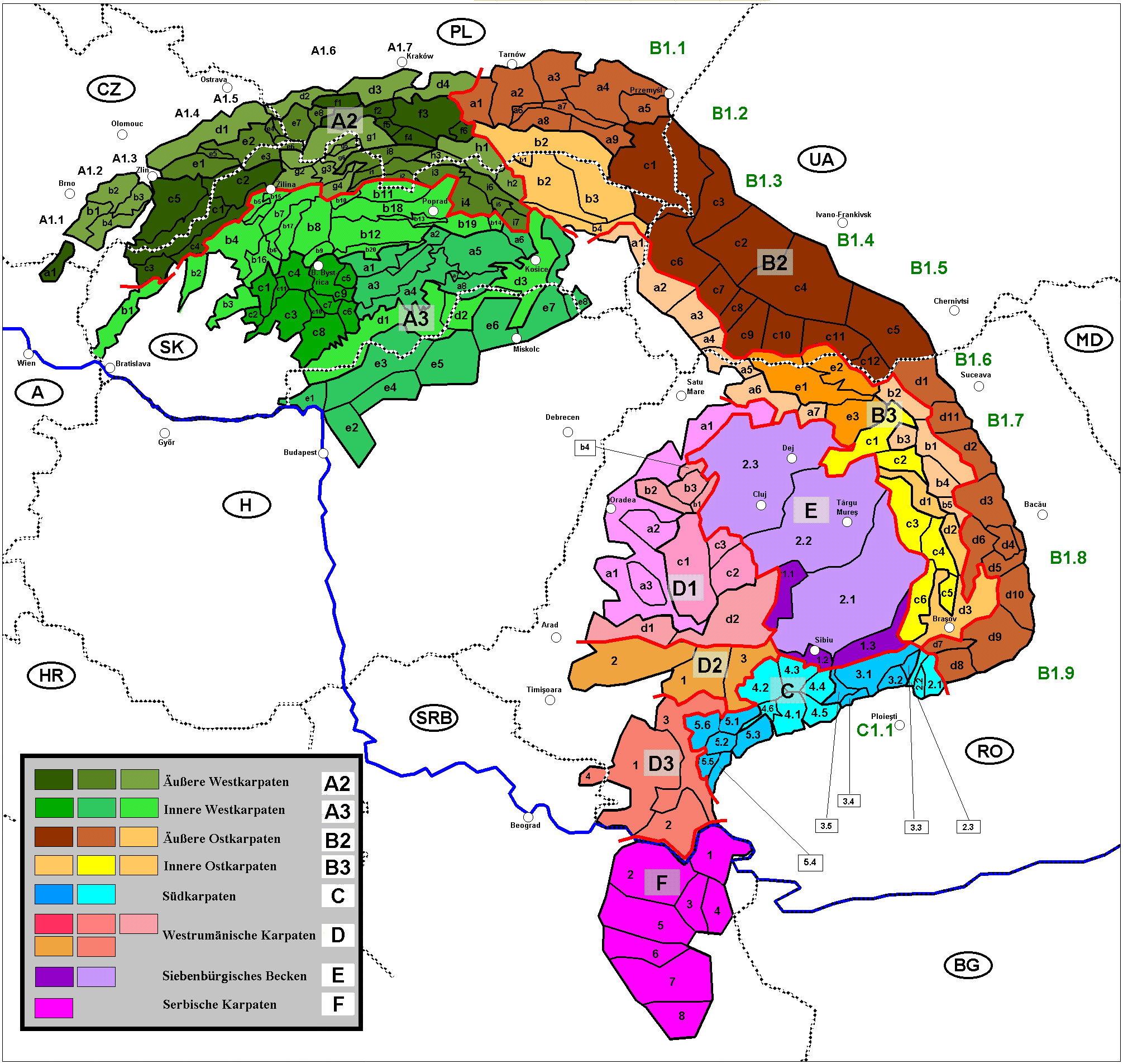
Divisions of the Carpathians. The Doły (Pits)=a9+a8+a6+a7; part of the Outer Eastern Carpathians

The Doły Jasielsko-Sanockie (Latin: Regio Pedemontana, Jasielsko–Sanockie Valleys, Jasło and Sanok Valleys, the Jasło-Sanok Basin or Jasielsko-Sanockie Pits) is a mountain range stretching between the Wisłoka and San Rivers in the West Carpathian Plateau and Central Beskidian Piedmont in southeastern Poland.

== Geography ==
The mountains reach up to 250–500 meters above sea level. The range is situated in the southern part of the Subcarpathian Voivodeship. It is the lowest mountain range of the Polish Carpathians.

They can be divided into: Gorlickie Depression, Jasielskie Plateau, Jasielsko – Krośnieńska Valley and Bukowskie Plateau. They stretch along a 100 km long and 18 km wide strip of land between Low Beskids in the south and heights of plateau in the north.

From the tourist point of view the region of Doły (Pits) is limited from the west by the valley of Ropa River, from the east by the Wisłok and San rivers, from the south by the Low Beskids line and from the north by a Dynowskie Plateau enclosed by the route of the national road No 28 ( from Zator to the national border in Medyka) on the section between Gorlice - Grybów - Biecz - Jasło - Krosno - Rymanów - Sanok. The highest summit on the side is Dział (678 m. high, above the sea level) in the Tabor and Czarny Potok rivers. In general mountains of the Doły are low with gentle slopes and long ridges with a flattened tops and domed summits, and only in some places are characterized by sharp downcasts. The height of summits varies from 350 to 650 m. above the sea level.

== Settlements ==
Important cities of this region include Biecz, Gorlice, Jasło, Krosno, Lesko, Brzozów, Jaćmierz, Rymanów, Jedlicze and Sanok.

== History ==
Historical names for the region include Doły Sanockie (Sanockie Pits) and Podole Sanockie (Sanockie Podolia); it stretches between Krosno County, Sanok County and Brzozów County.

In 1854 the first oil field in the world started producing oil in village of Bóbrka near Krosno.

== Division ==
Since there exist many variants of divisions of the mountain ranges and names for the Doły (Pits), several divisions are given in the following:

- Obniżenie Gorlickie
- Kotlina Jasielsko-Krośnieńską
- Pogórze Jasielskie
- Pogórze Bukowskie

== Hiking trails ==
- European walking route E8
  - Iwonicz-Zdrój – Rymanów-Zdrój - Puławy – Tokarnia (778 m) – Przybyszów – Kamień (717 m) – Komańcza (Główny Szlak Beskidzki)
  - Pasmo Bukowicy - Kanasiówka (823 m) – Wisłok Wielki – Tokarnia (778 m), 1 km – Wola Piotrowa
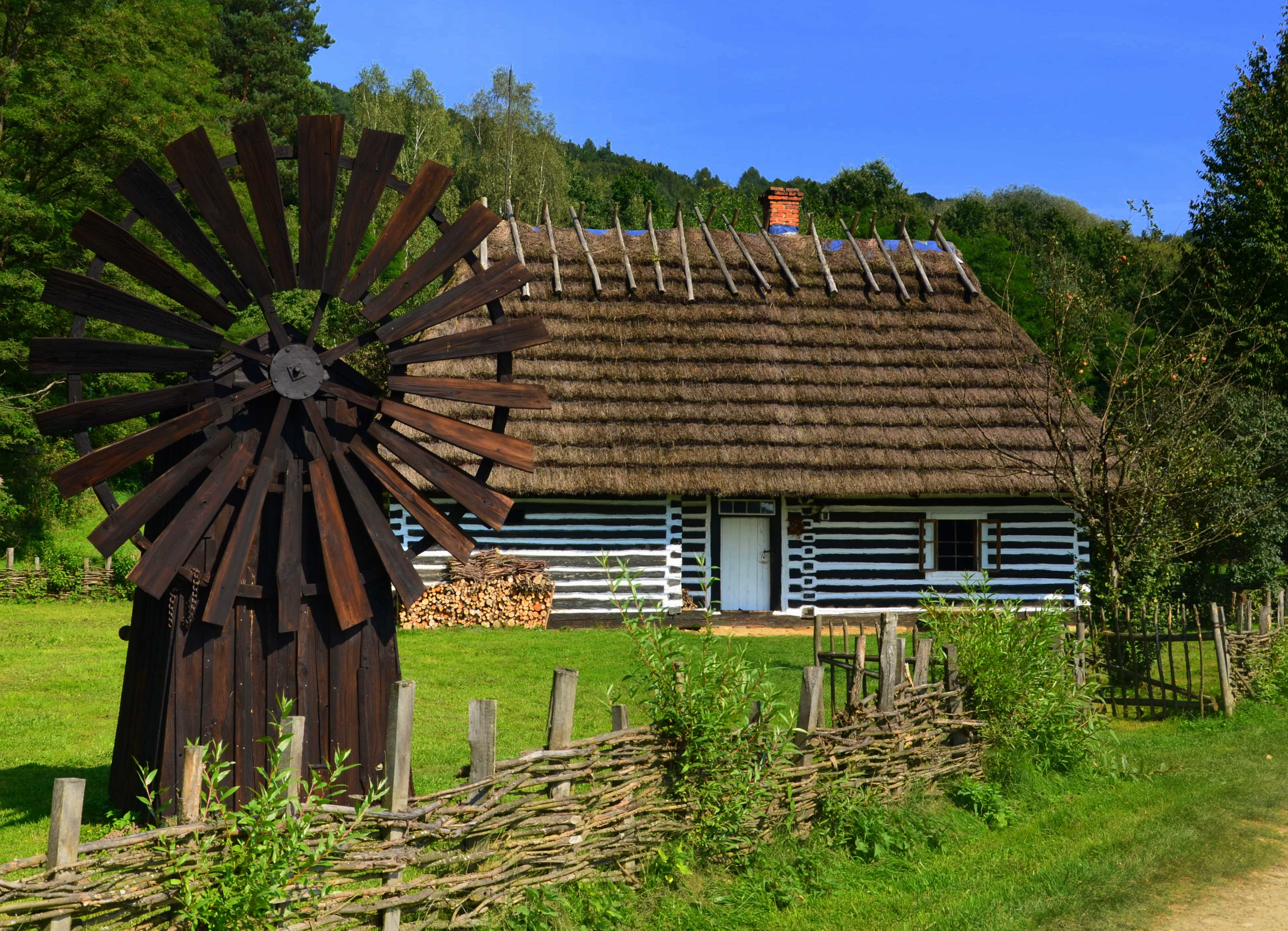

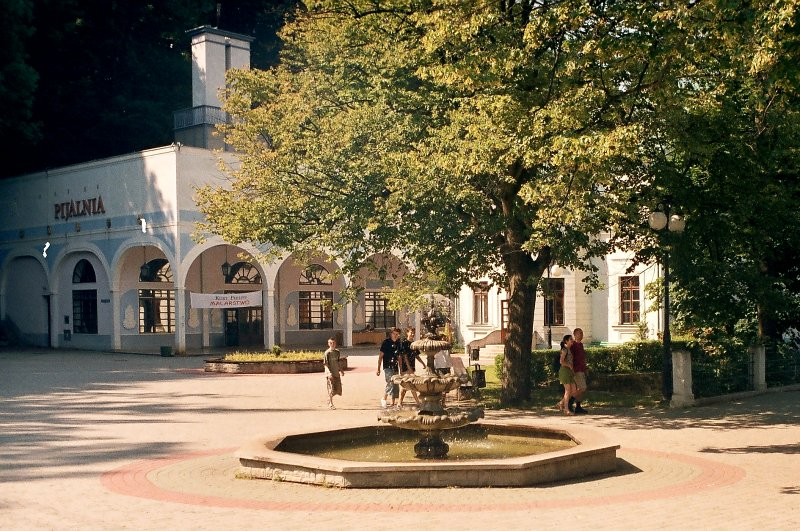

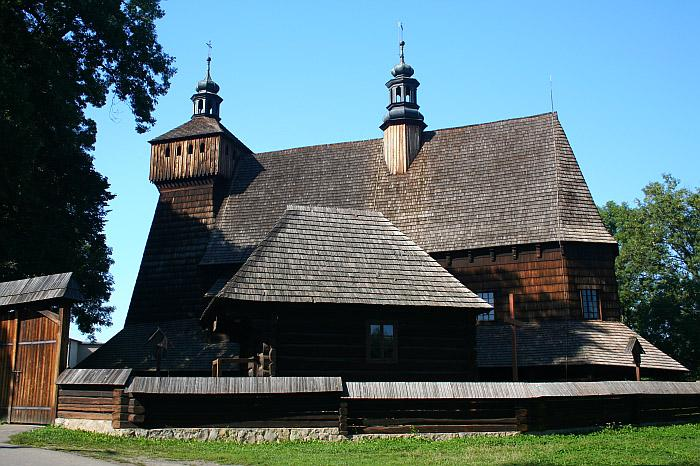

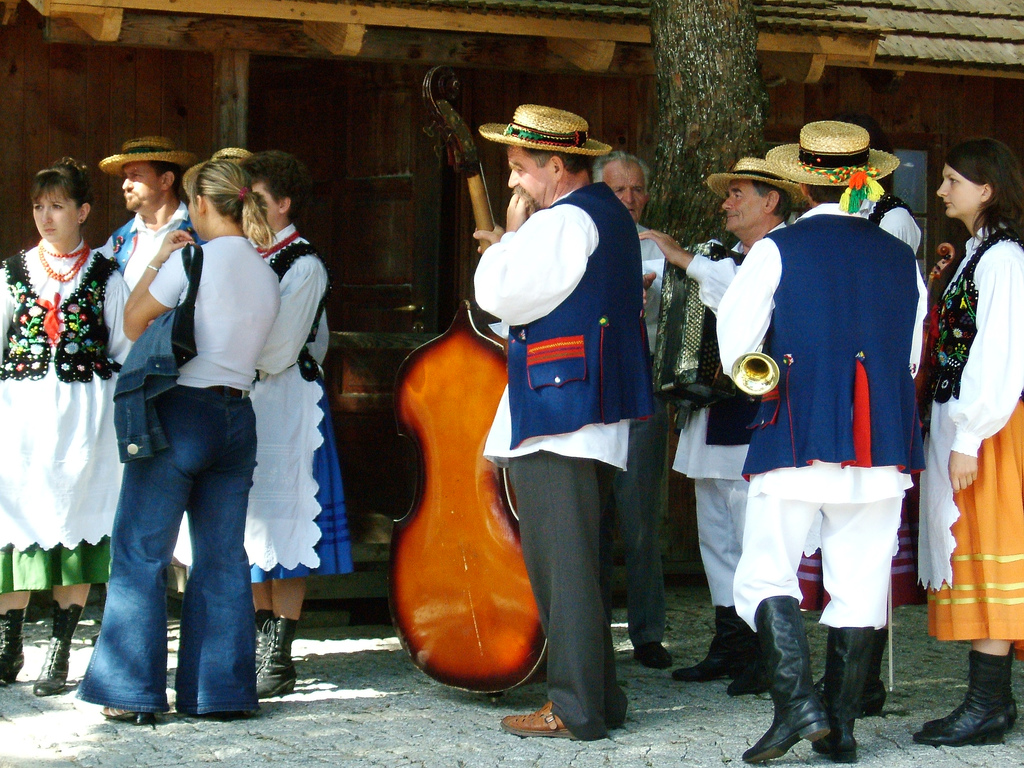

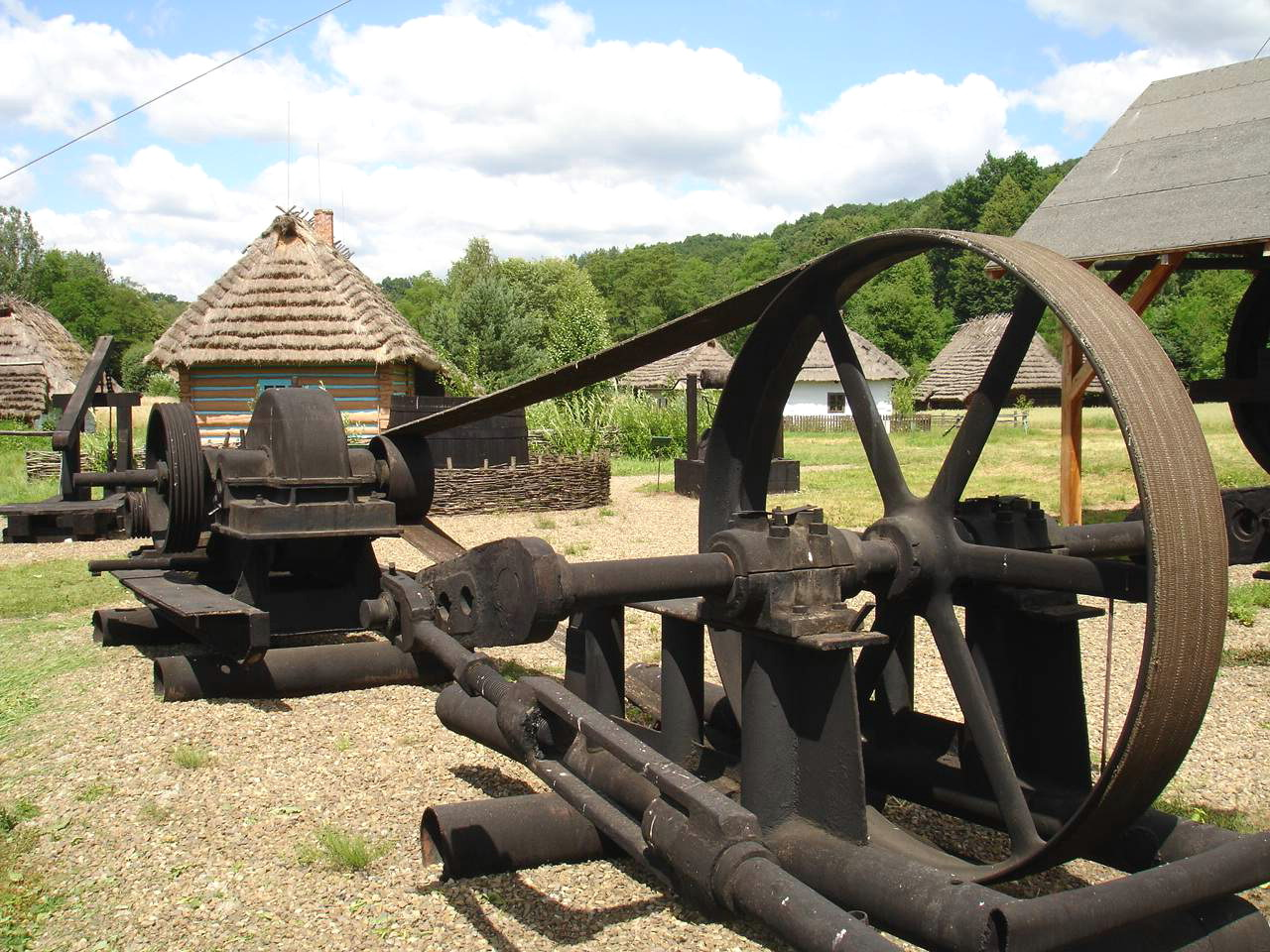

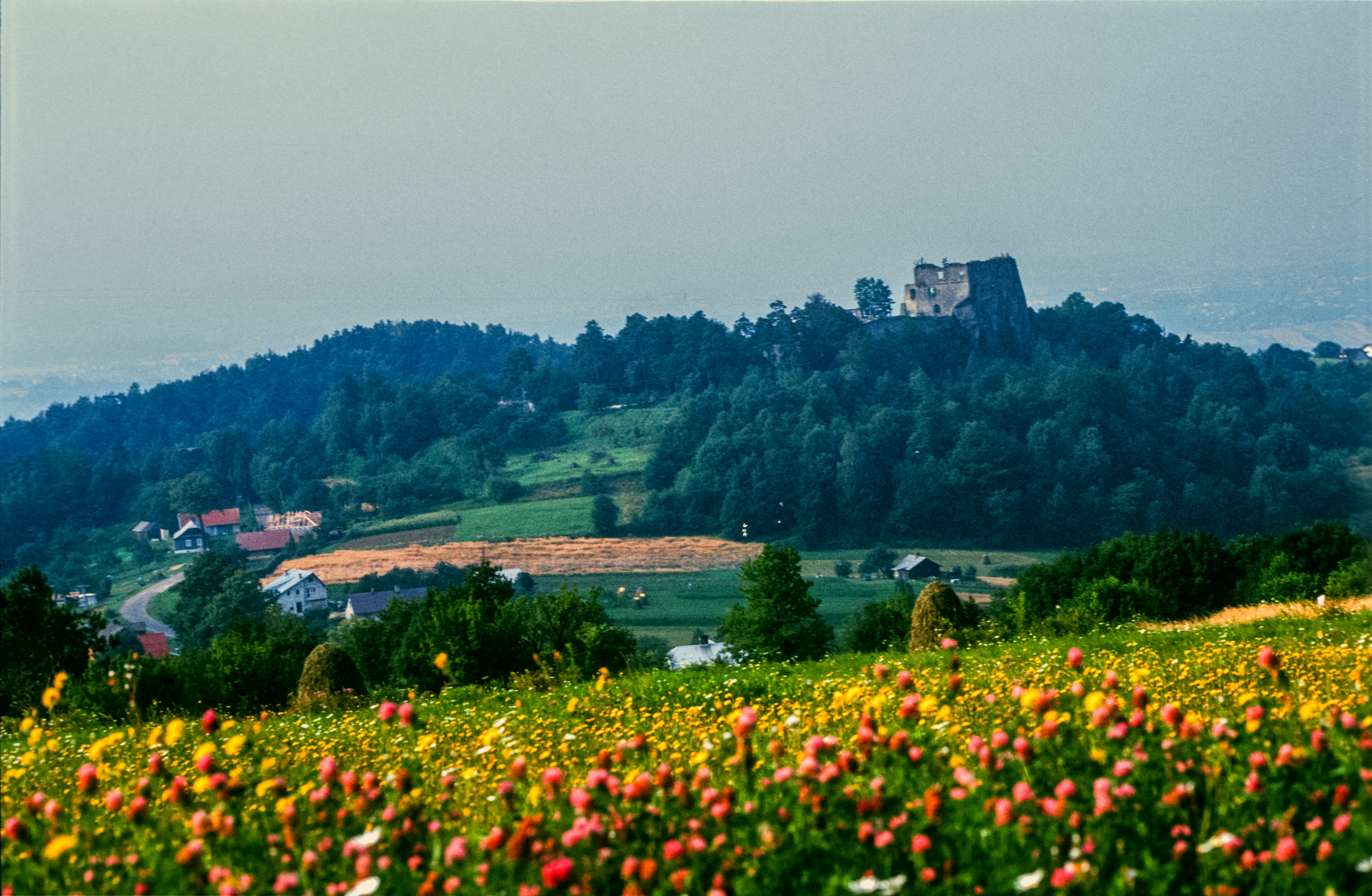

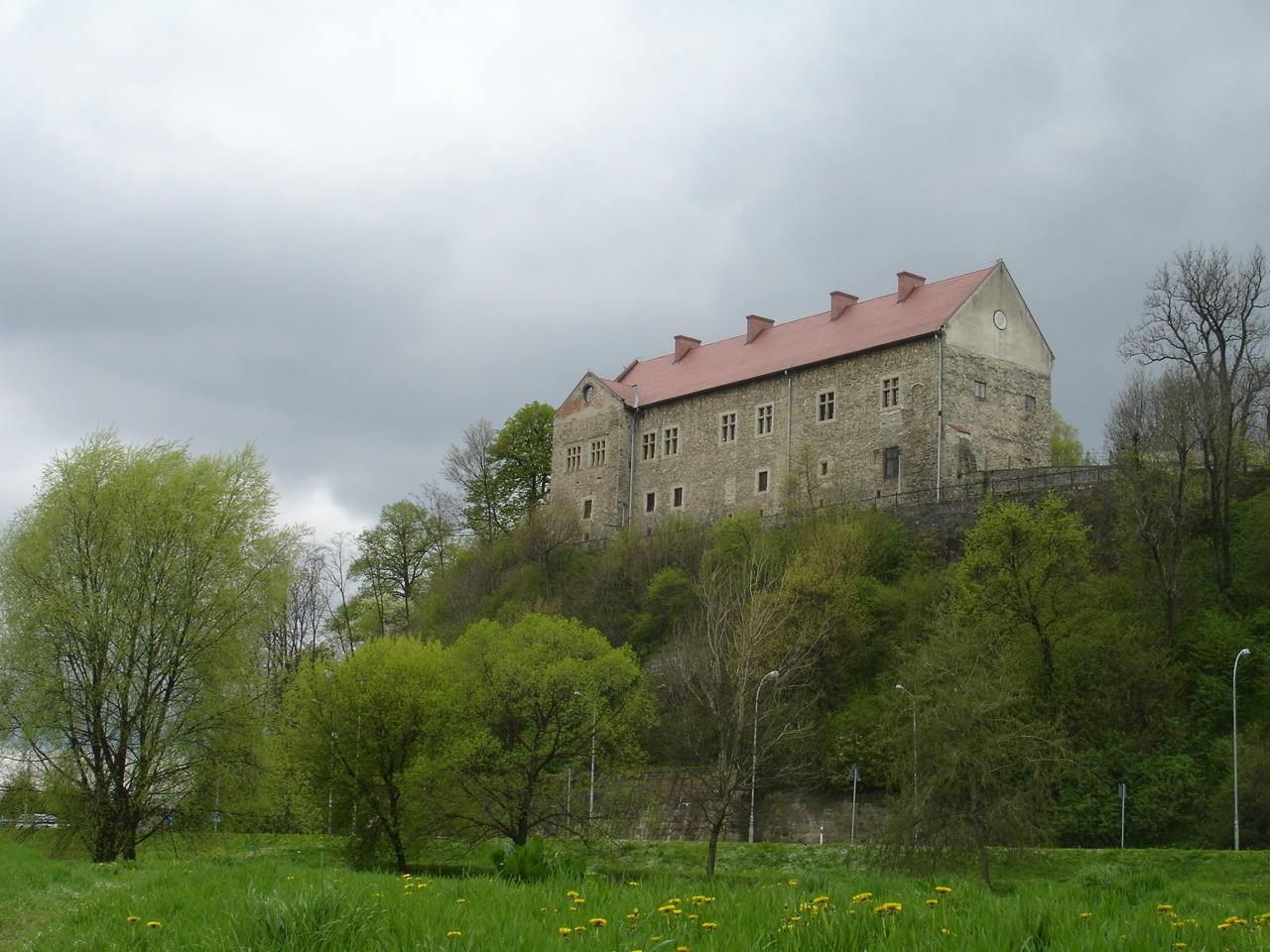

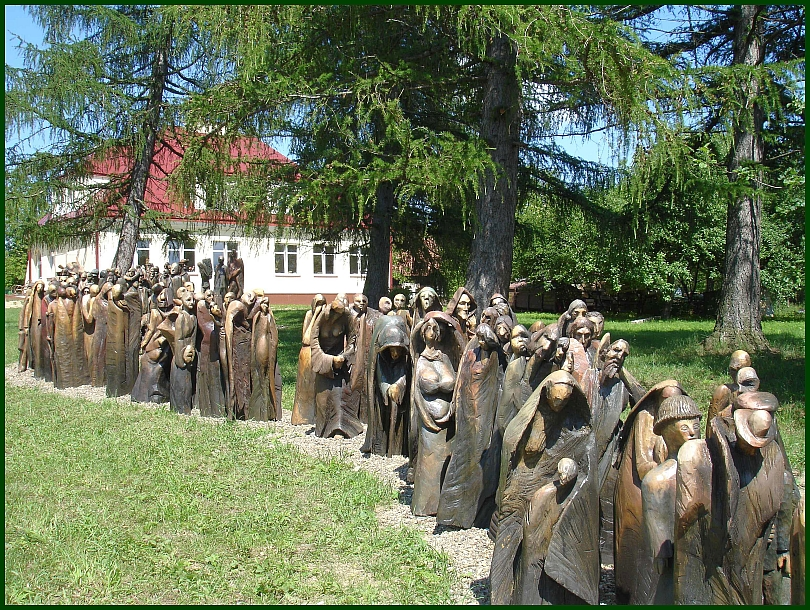

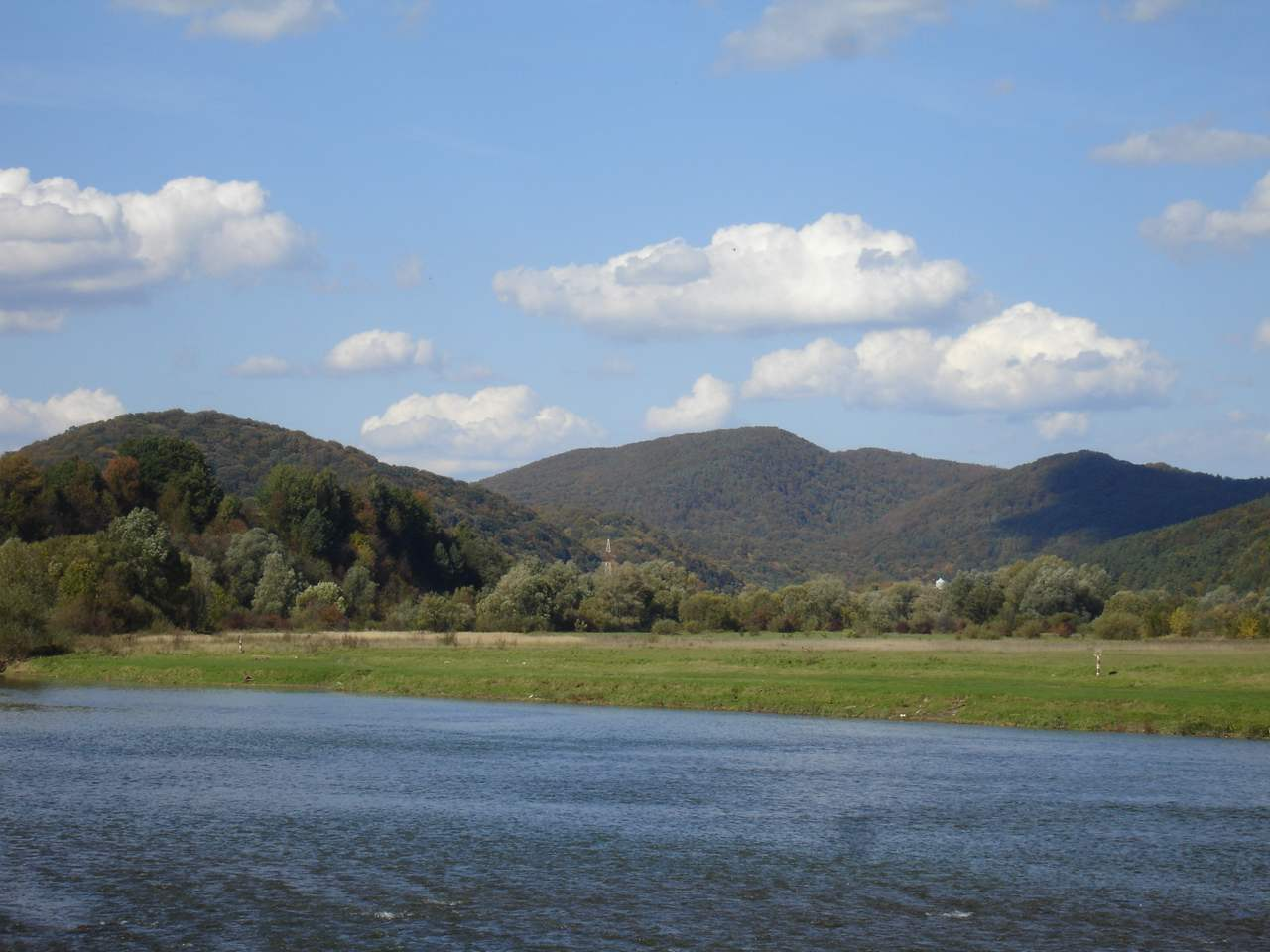

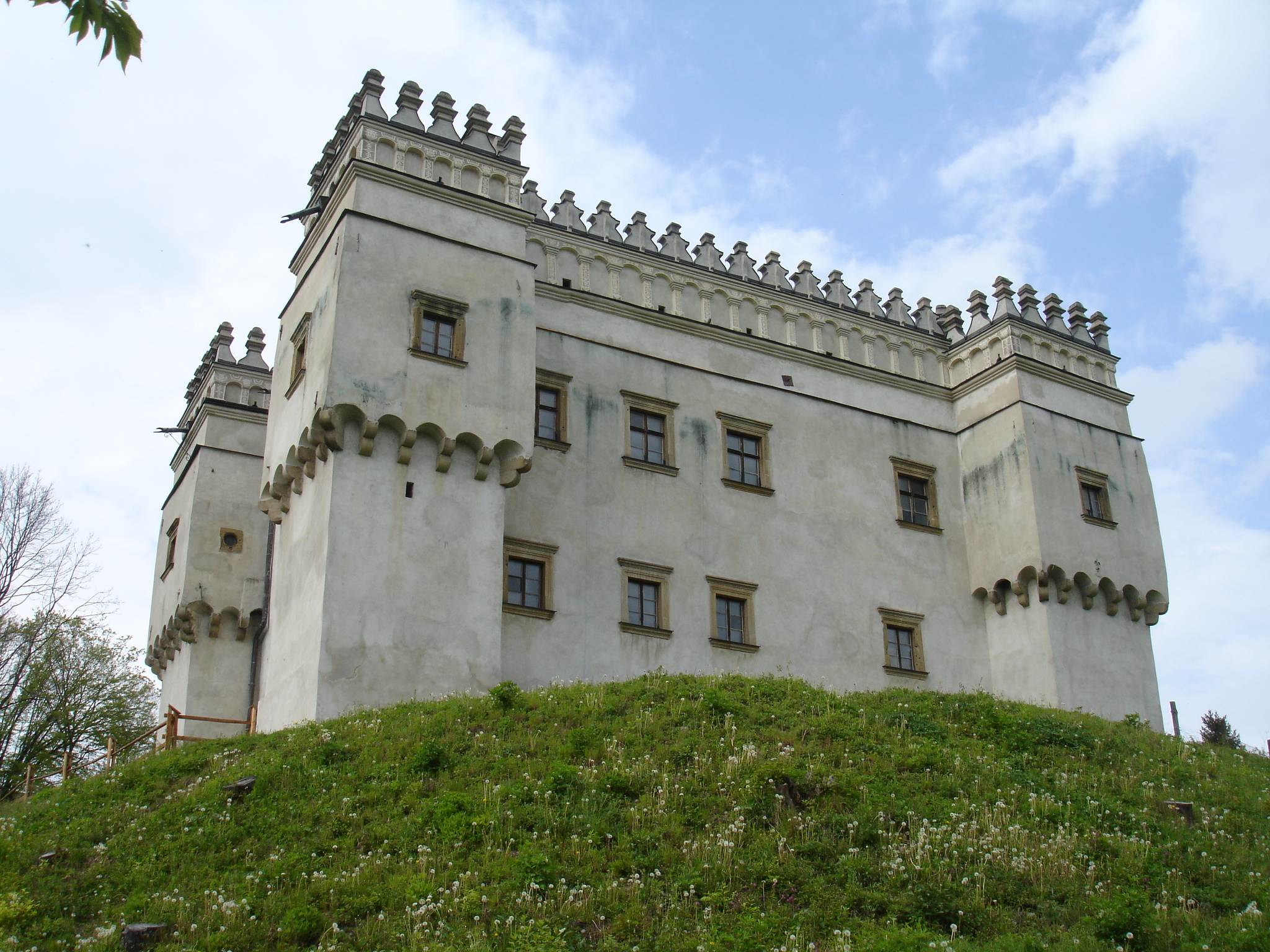

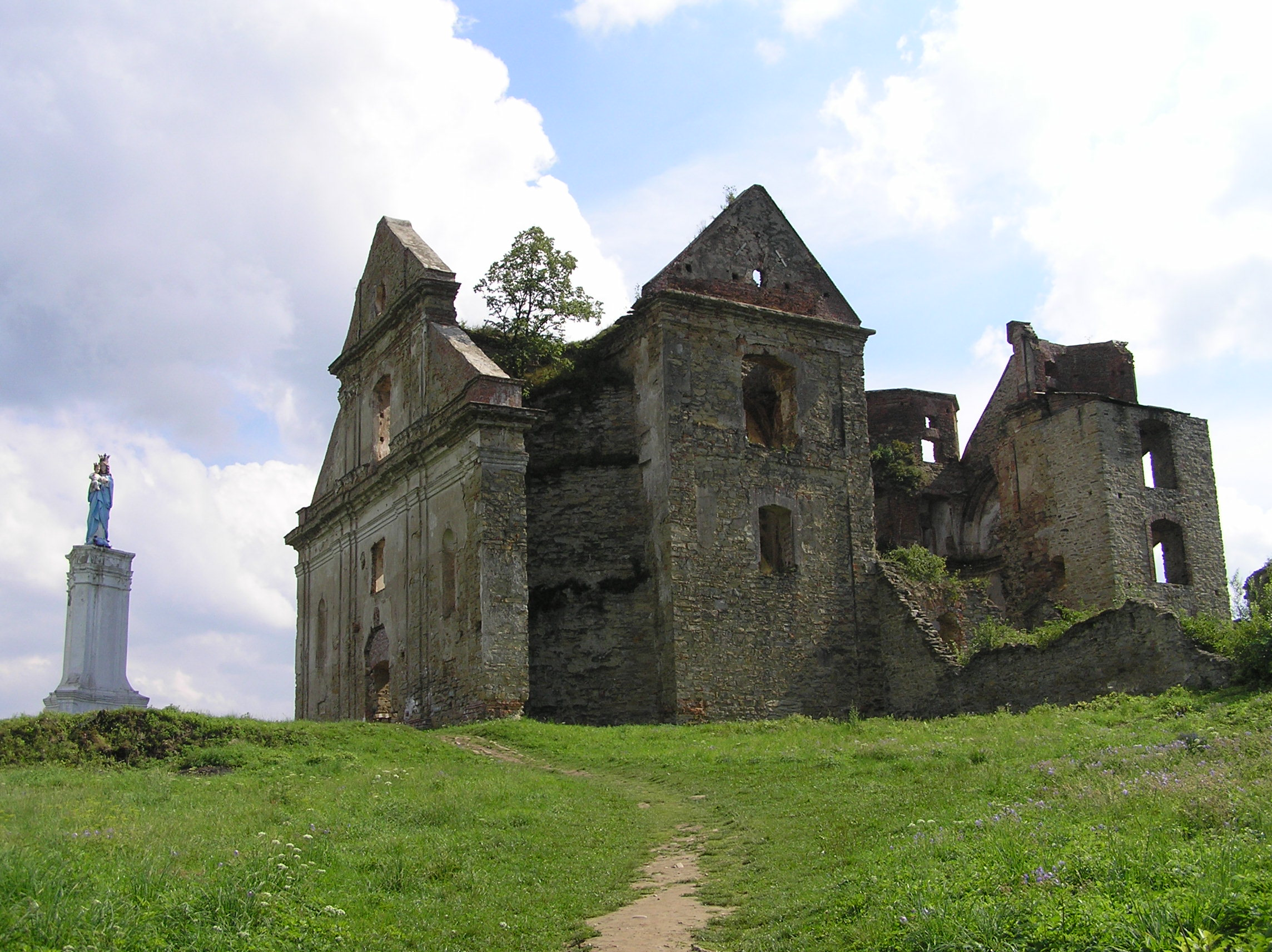

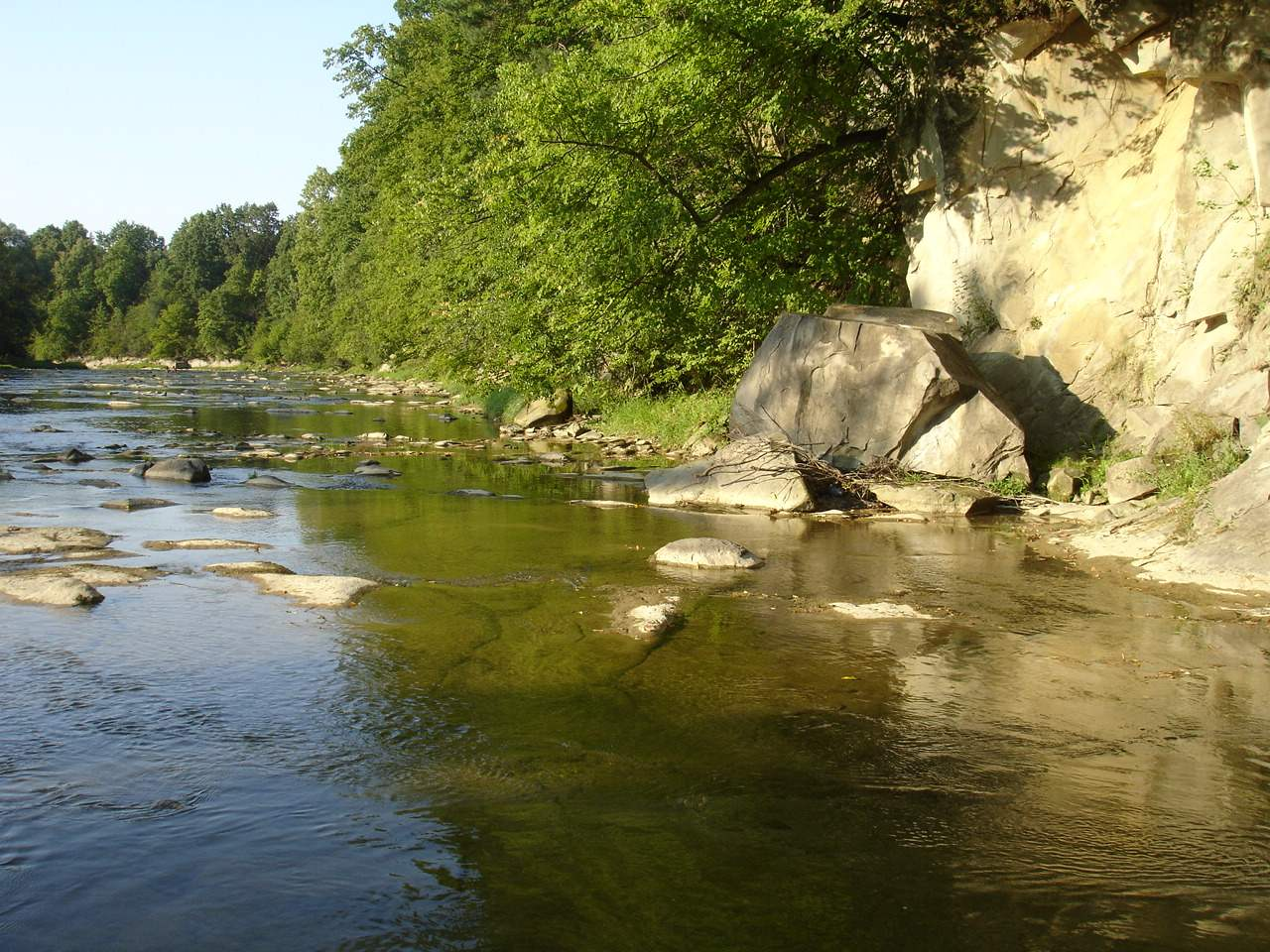

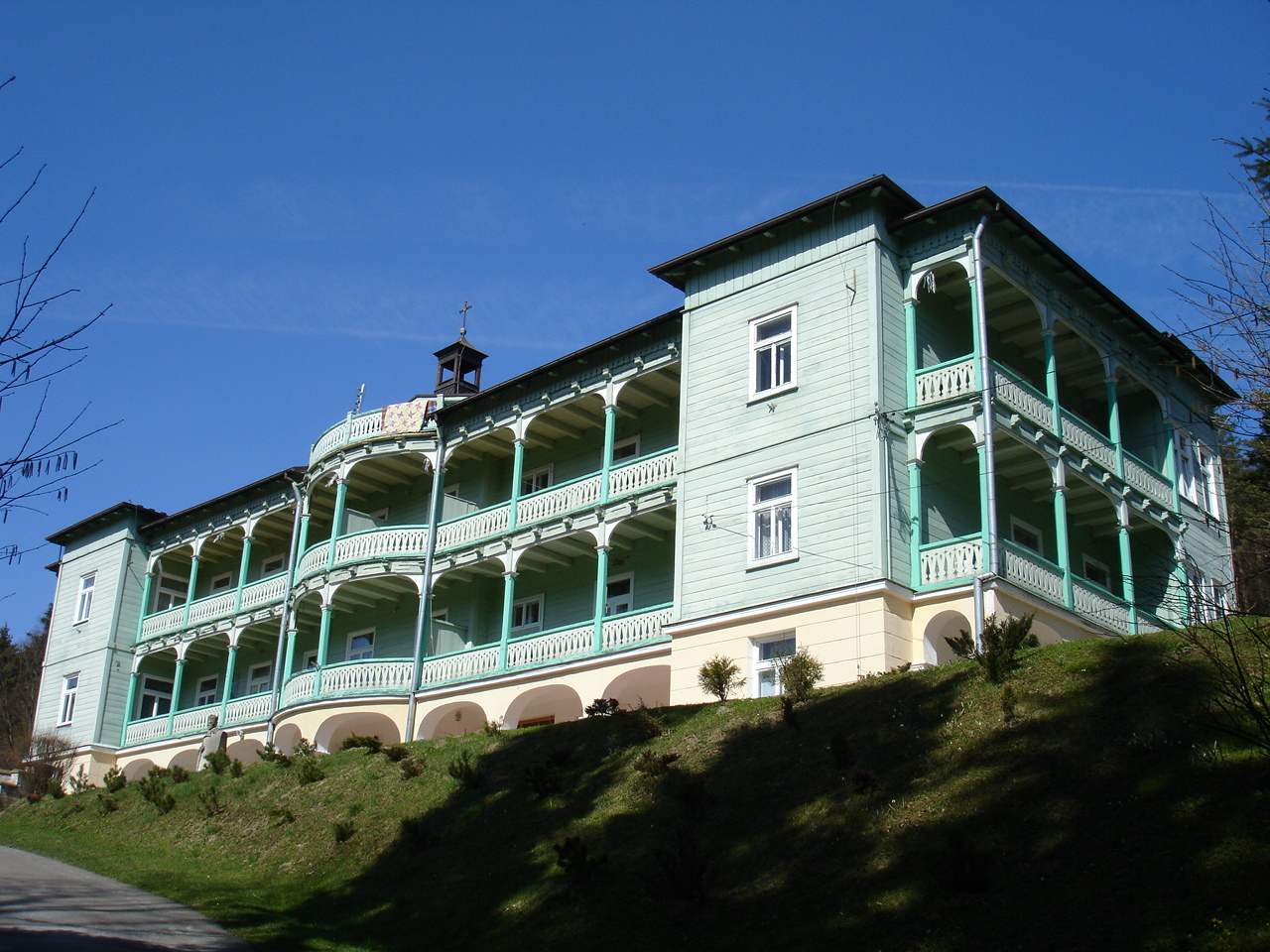

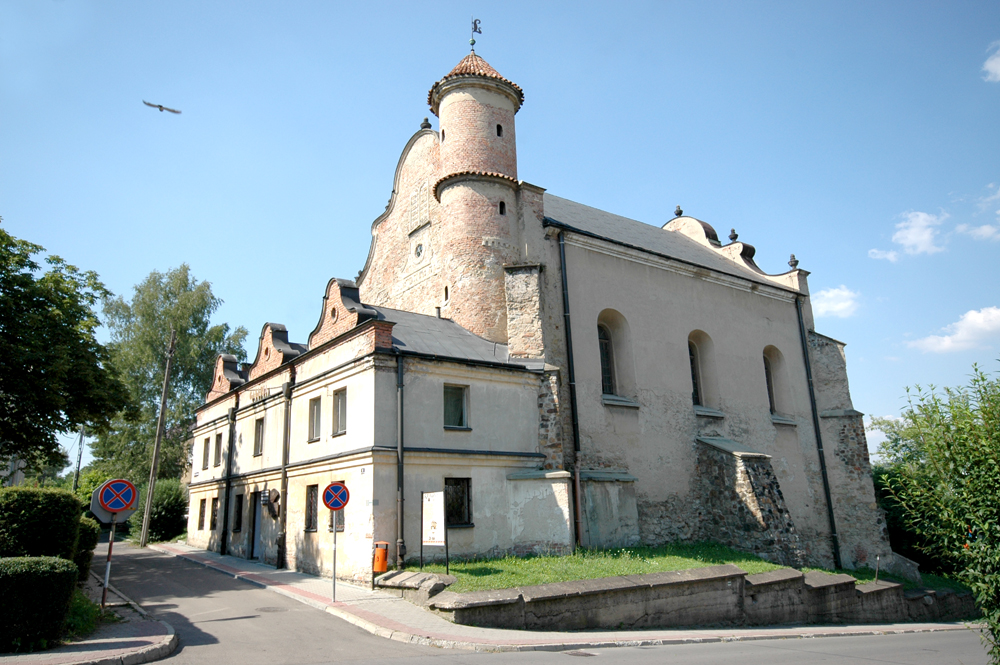

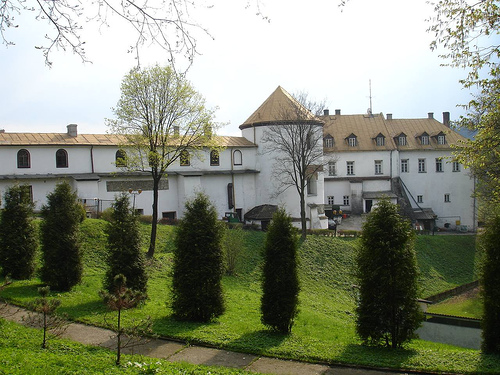

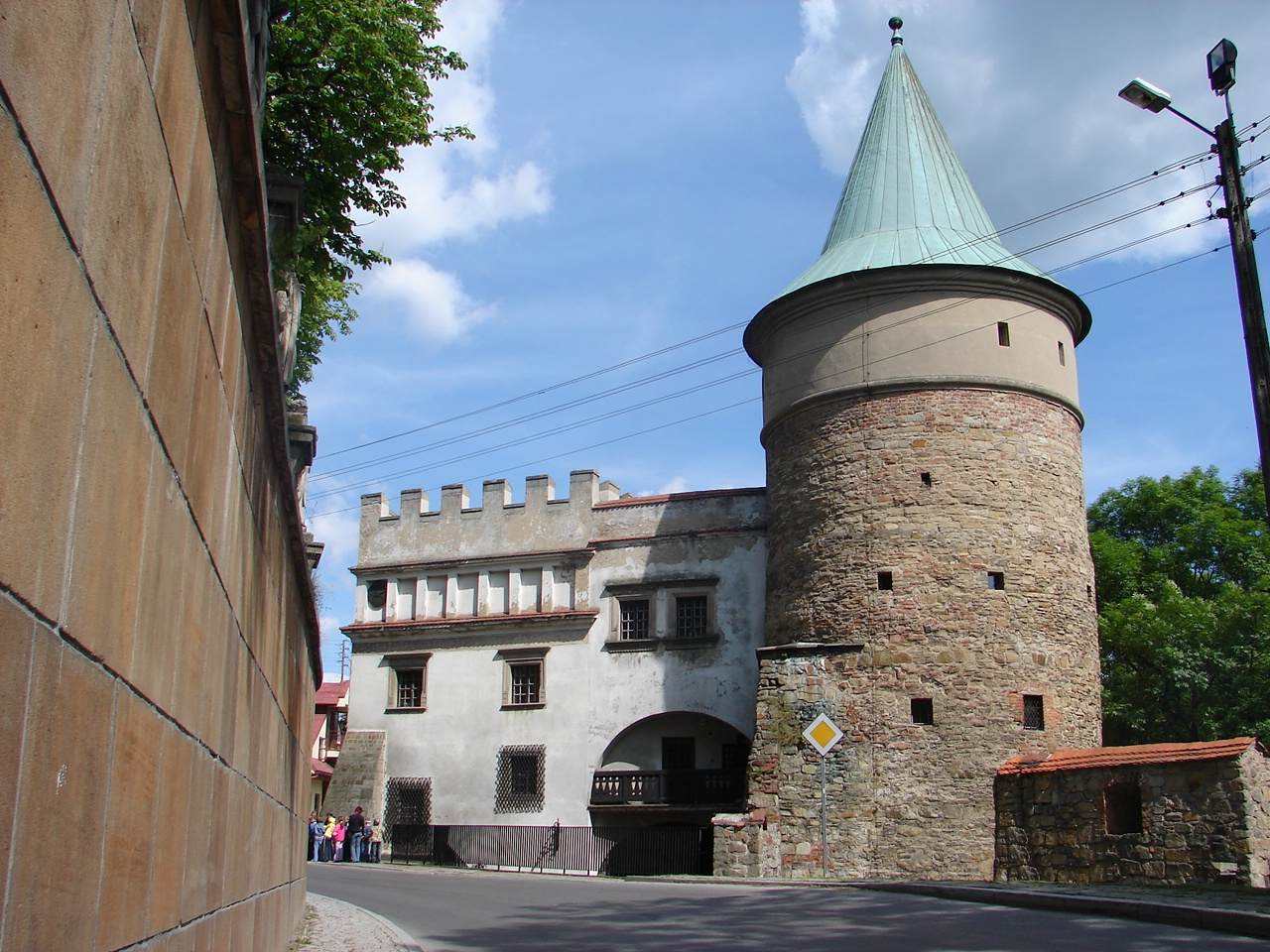

== Ethnic groups ==
- Poles

== See also ==
- Museum of Folk Architecture, Sanok
- Petroleum Trail
