= Pogórze Bukowskie =

Bukowskie Upland
- Polish: Pogórze Bukowskie
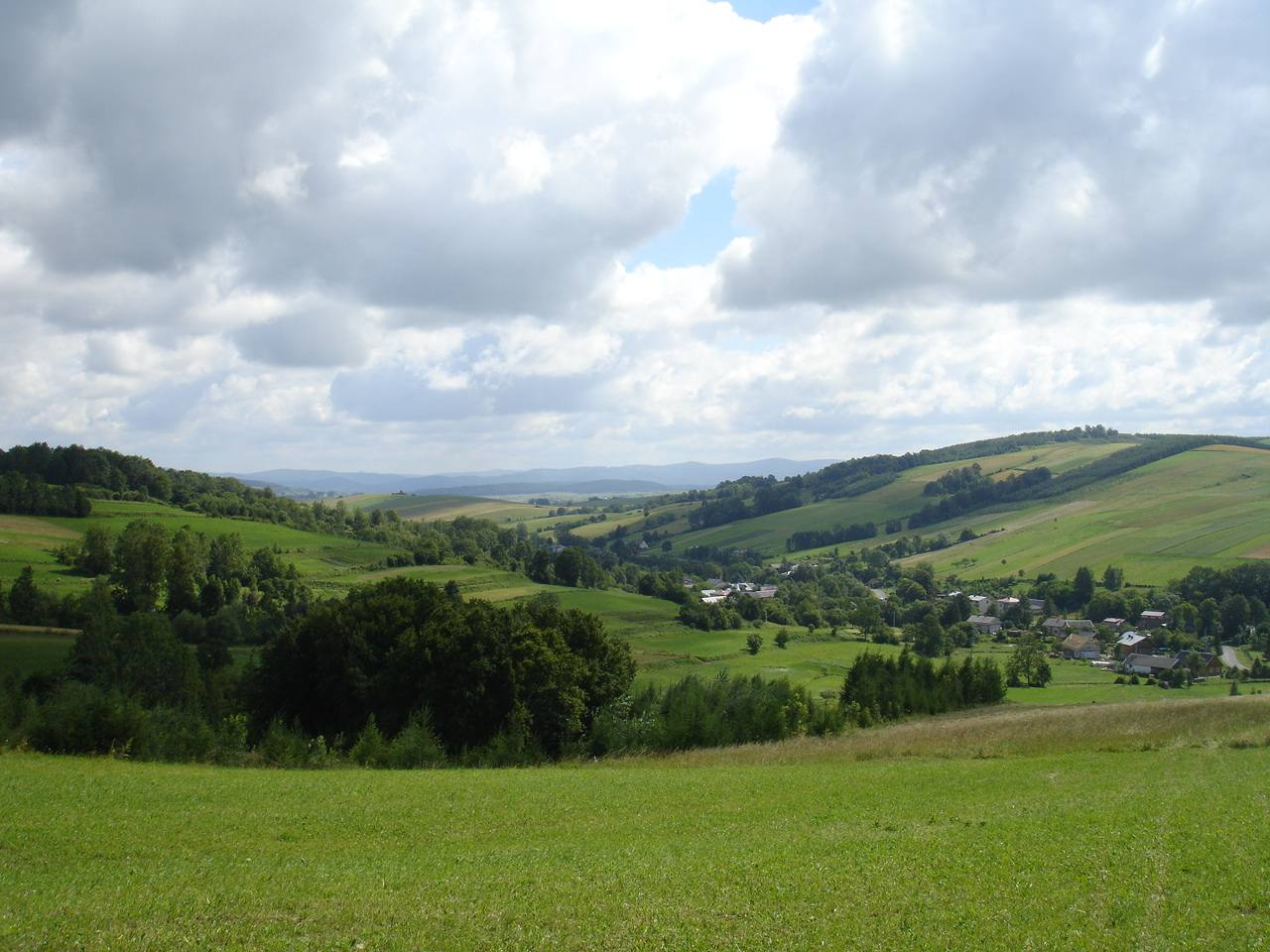
- A view from Bukowica Peak in western Nowotaniec.

Highest point
- Peak: Żurawinka
- Elevation: 664 m (2,178 ft)
- Coordinates: 49°27′00″N 22°46′44″E

Dimensions
- Length: 45 km (28 mi) west-east
- Width: 15–20 km (9.3–12.4 mi) north-south
- Area: 720 km^{2} (280 mi^{2})

Geography
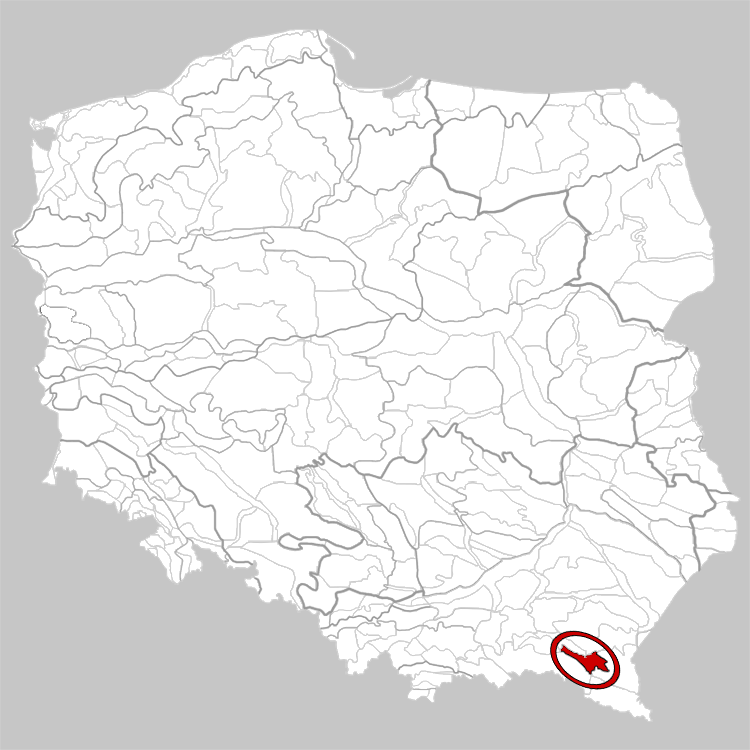
- Country: Poland
- Range coordinates: 49°29′N 22°40′E
- Parent range: Doły Jasielsko Sanockie in Gmina Bukowsko, Gmina Besko, Gmina Sanok, Gmina Lesko, Gmina Komańcza
- Borders on: Bieszczady Mountains, and Low Beskids

Geology
- Rock type(s): granite, gneiss, limestone

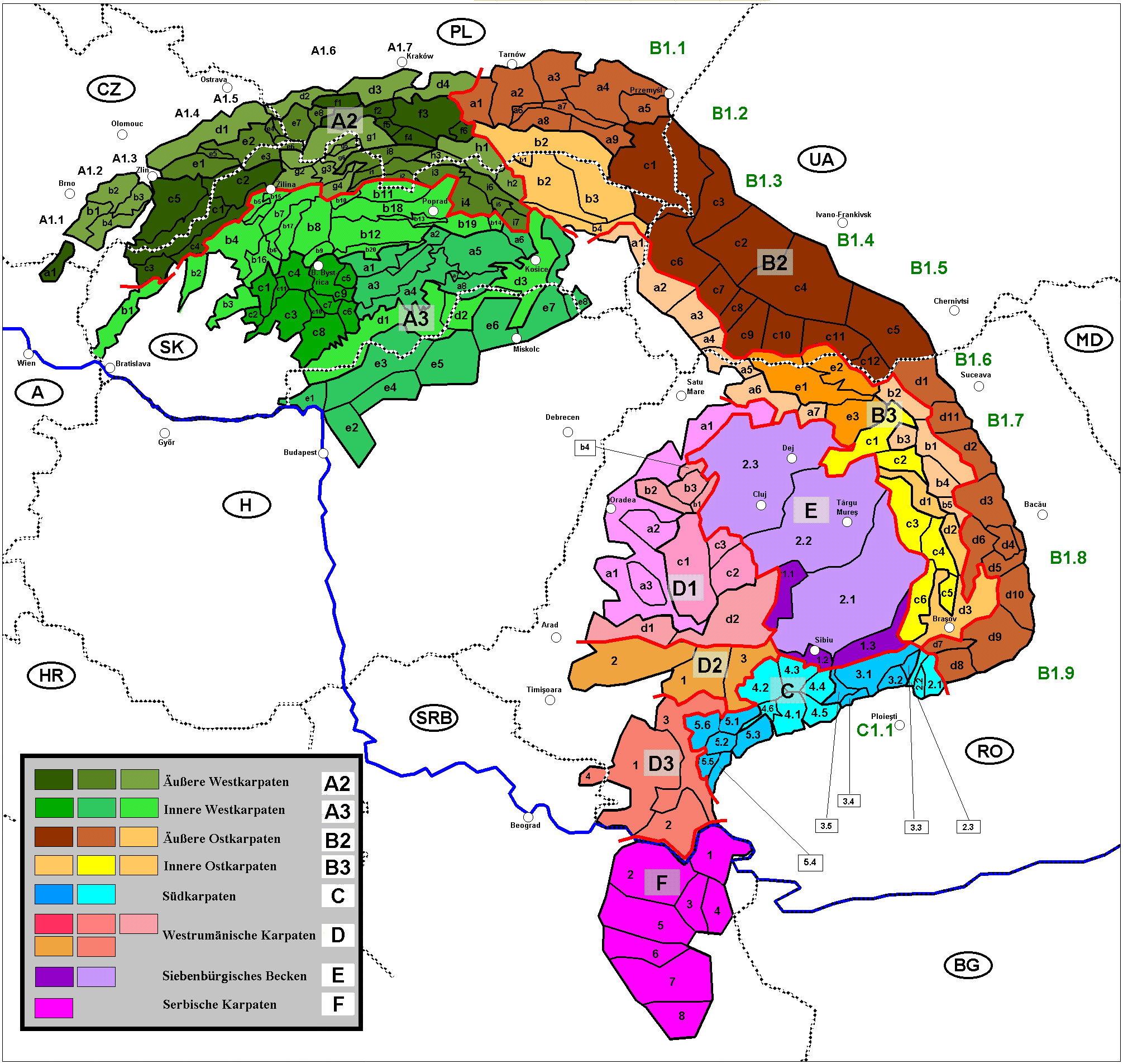
The Pogorze Bukowskie (Bukowskie Upland)=a9; part of the Outer Eastern Carpathians

The Pogórze Bukowskie (also Bukowskie Upland, Bukowsko Upland, Bukowskie Piedmont, Bukowskie Plateau, Bukowskie Foothills) is one of the Beskids mountain ranges of the Outer Eastern Carpathians in southeastern Poland, part of the Central Beskidian Piedmont. Is a hilly region in Poland (Sanok County and Podkarpacie), between Beskid Niski and Bieszczady near the river Osława and San. Its name comes from the west Slavic dialect word buk, meaning "beech".

Important villages in the region include Bukowsko, Komańcza, Nowotaniec, Zagórz, Wola Sękowa, Wola Piotrowa, and Lesko. It is home to the Uniwersytet Ludowy, opened in 2005, which contains many artworks and effects of the folk handworks inspiration. Pogórze Bukowskie is situated in the poorest region of Poland.

The region was a site of contention between Poland, Kievan Rus and Hungary starting as far back as the 9th century.

Until 1947, 45% of the population of this part of the mountains were Lemkos (subgroup of Rusyns), 45% Polish Uplanders and 10% Jews. The killing of the Polish General Karol Świerczewski in Jabłonki by the Ukrainian Insurgent Army in 1947 was the direct cause of the replacement of the Lemkos, the so-called Operation Vistula.

Original flora and fauna were preserved because of the area's remoteness. The mountain range is covered with beech forests. The area is protected by Jaśliski Park Krajobrazowy. Animals living in this reserve include black storks, deer and wolves.

There are many tourist attractions, including historic wooden churches (Wisłok Wielki, Komańcza, Kulaszne, Rzepedź, Szczawne etc.), the increasingly popular skiing resorts of Karlików and Puławy Górne, and the Regional Championship of the Hucul Horse at Rudawka Rymanowska.

== Hiking trails ==
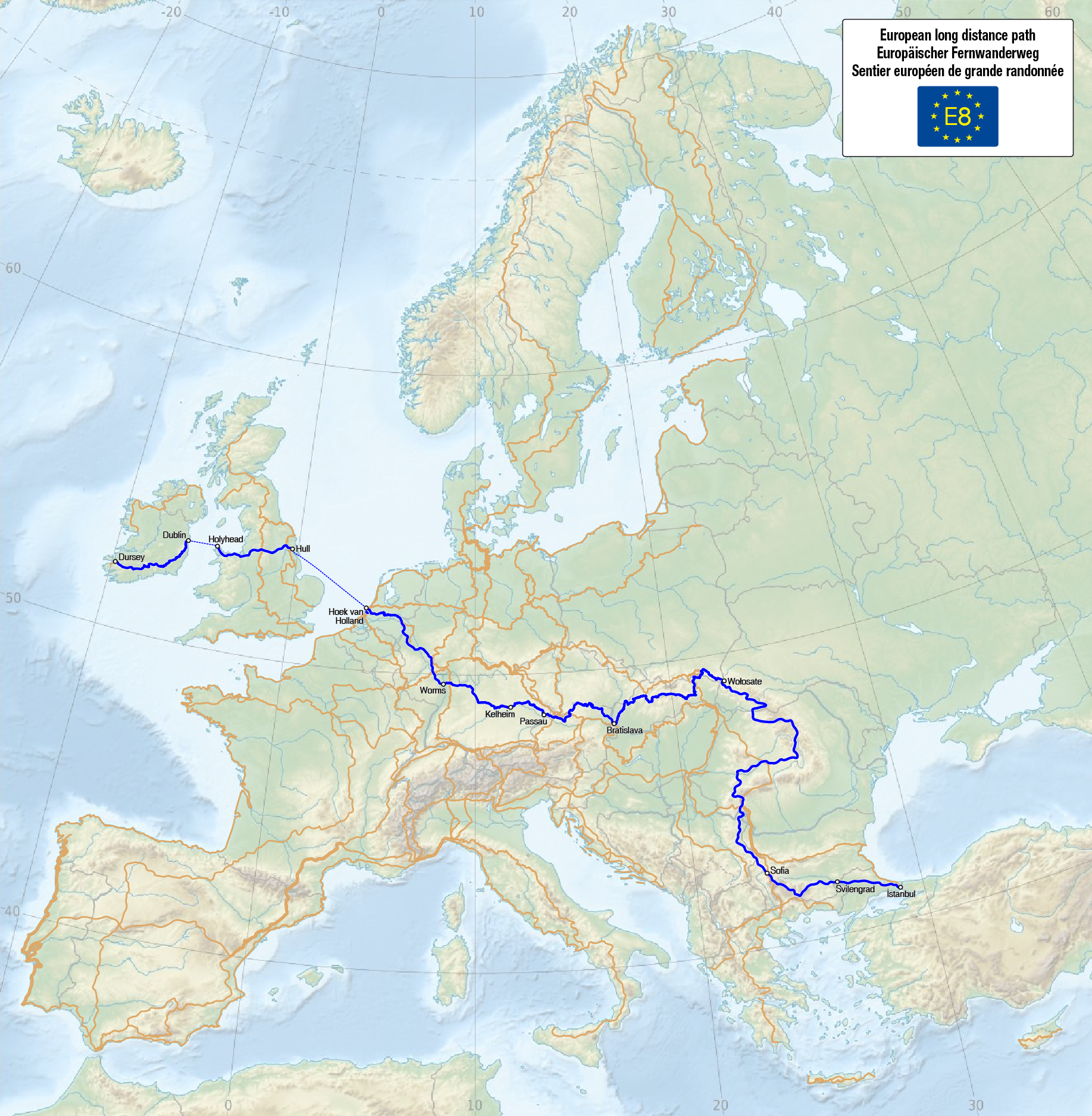
The European walking route E8

- European walking route E8
  - Iwonicz-Zdrój – Rymanów-Zdrój - Puławy – Tokarnia (778 m) – Przybyszów – Kamień (717 m) – Komańcza (Główny Szlak Beskidzki)
  - Pasmo Bukowicy - Kanasiówka (823 m) – Wisłok Wielki – Tokarnia (778 m), 1 km – Wola Piotrowa
  - Komańcza – Dołżyca – Garb Średni (822 m) – Kanasiówka (823 m) – Moszczaniec – Surowica – Darów – Puławy Górne– Besko

== Rivers ==
- Wisłok
- Sanoczek
- Osława
- Pielnica

== National Exposition of the Simmental Cattle ==
Simmental cattle were brought to Poland at the end of 18th century. In 1909, there were 21 Simmental cattle farms in the Polish Kingdom and in 1920 the Association of Highland Cattle Breeders was founded. In the period between the wars, breeding of Simmental cattle was concentrated in Eastern Małopolska Region and, specifically, in two districts: Krośnieński and Sanocki. At the time, the best cattle farms in Biłoboki reached the capacity of 6,295 kg of milk with 3.9 L fat content. From the outburst of the Second World War until 1995, a strong downward trend in the popularity of the breed among Polish breeders could be observed. Simmental bulls were liquidated and cows were typically mated with bulls of the Polish red breed. In 1955, by virtue of a decision issued by the Ministry of Agriculture, the breeding of Simmental cattle was located in south-eastern part of then Rzeszów Region in several counties and the Pedigree Breeding Center was set up in Brzozów. Between 1956 and 1950, cows and bulls were imported from Switzerland, Romania and Austria and, from 1972 to 1974, also from Germany. In total, between 1956 and 1974, 1,770 Simmental cows and 61 Simmental bulls were imported to Poland. From the early 1990s, the breeding of the Simmental cattle experienced another crisis resulting directly from a general recession in the whole Polish farming sector. The sale of the State Pedigree Breeding Center in Brzozów followed by the Center's liquidation aggravated the crises. In the end of the 1990s, the condition of the sector began to improve slightly. At present, the population of Simmental cattle in Poland is nearly 40,000.

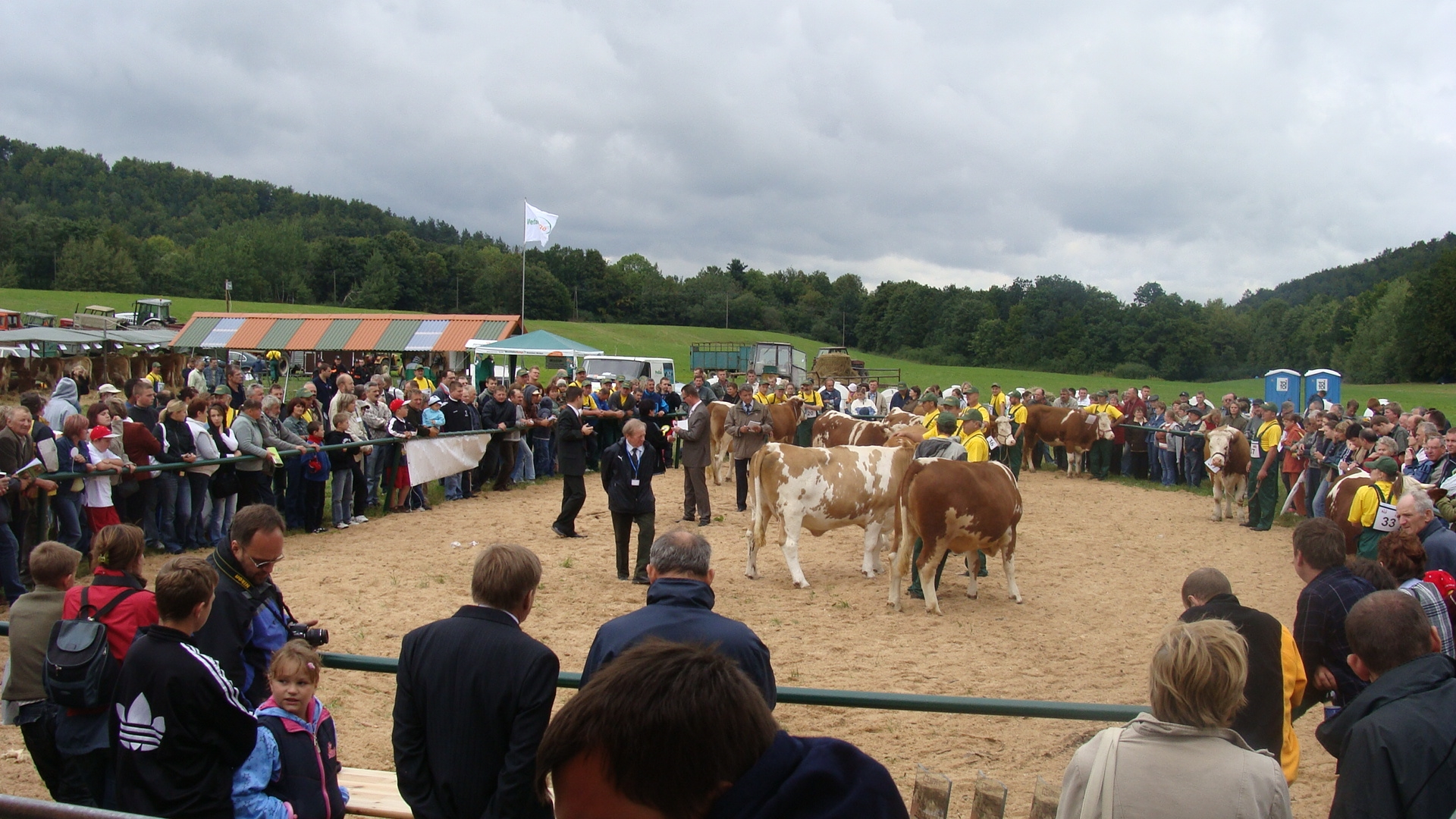
National Exposition of the Simmental Cattle and the Regional Championship of Hucul Horse.

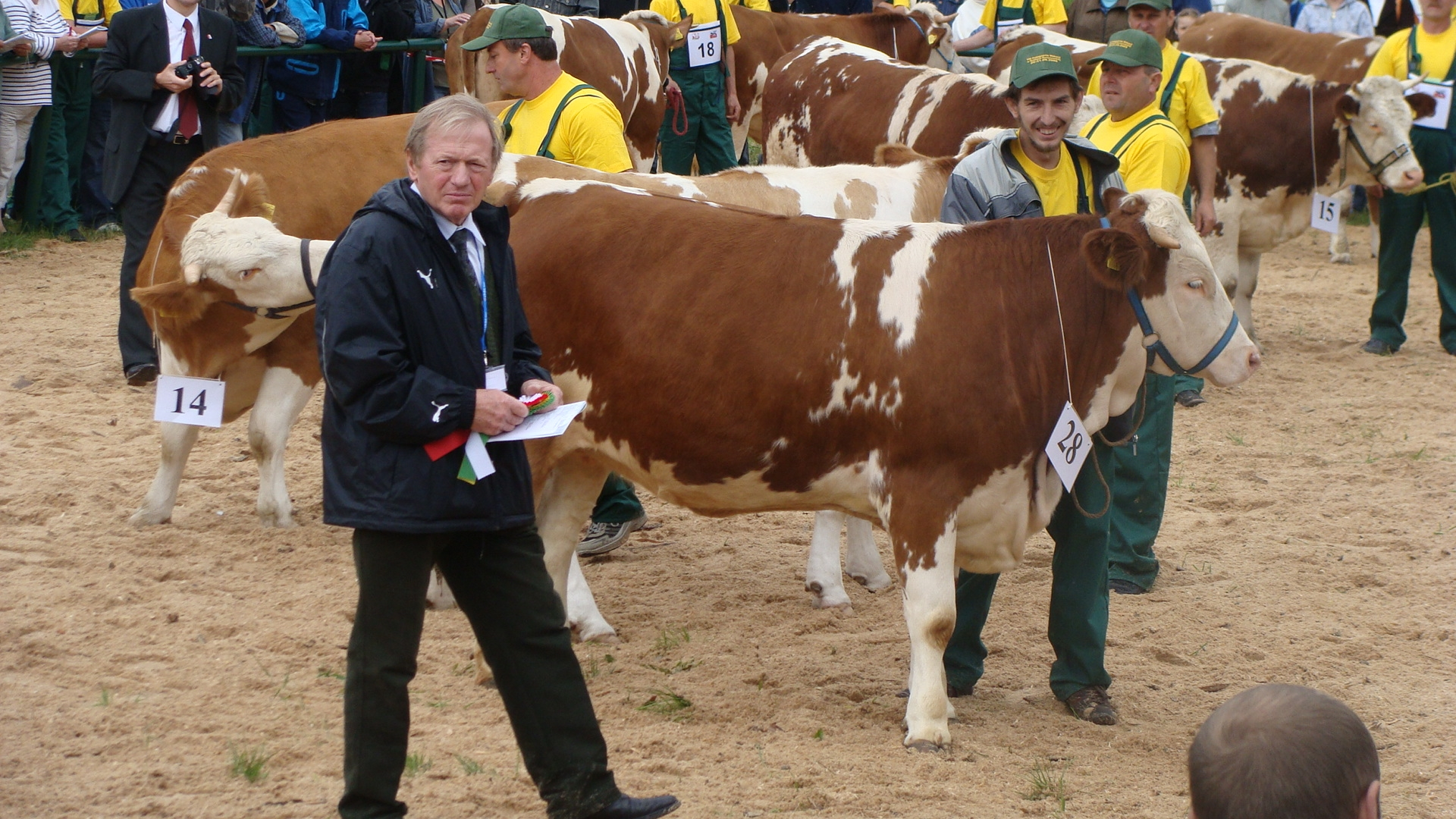
National Exposition of the Simmental Cattle and the Regional Championship of Hucul Horse.

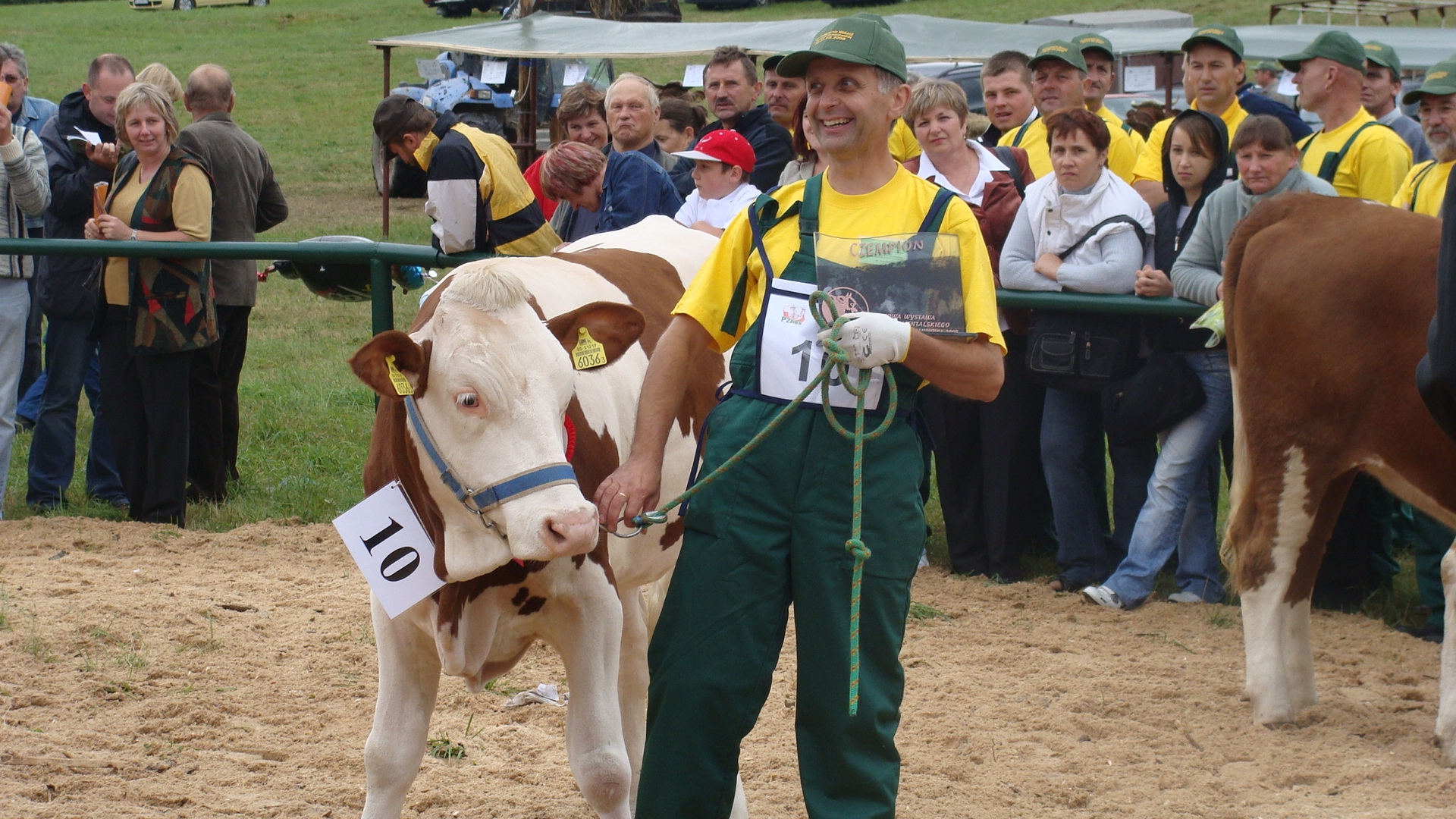
National Exposition of the Simmental Cattle and the Regional Championship of Hucul Horse.

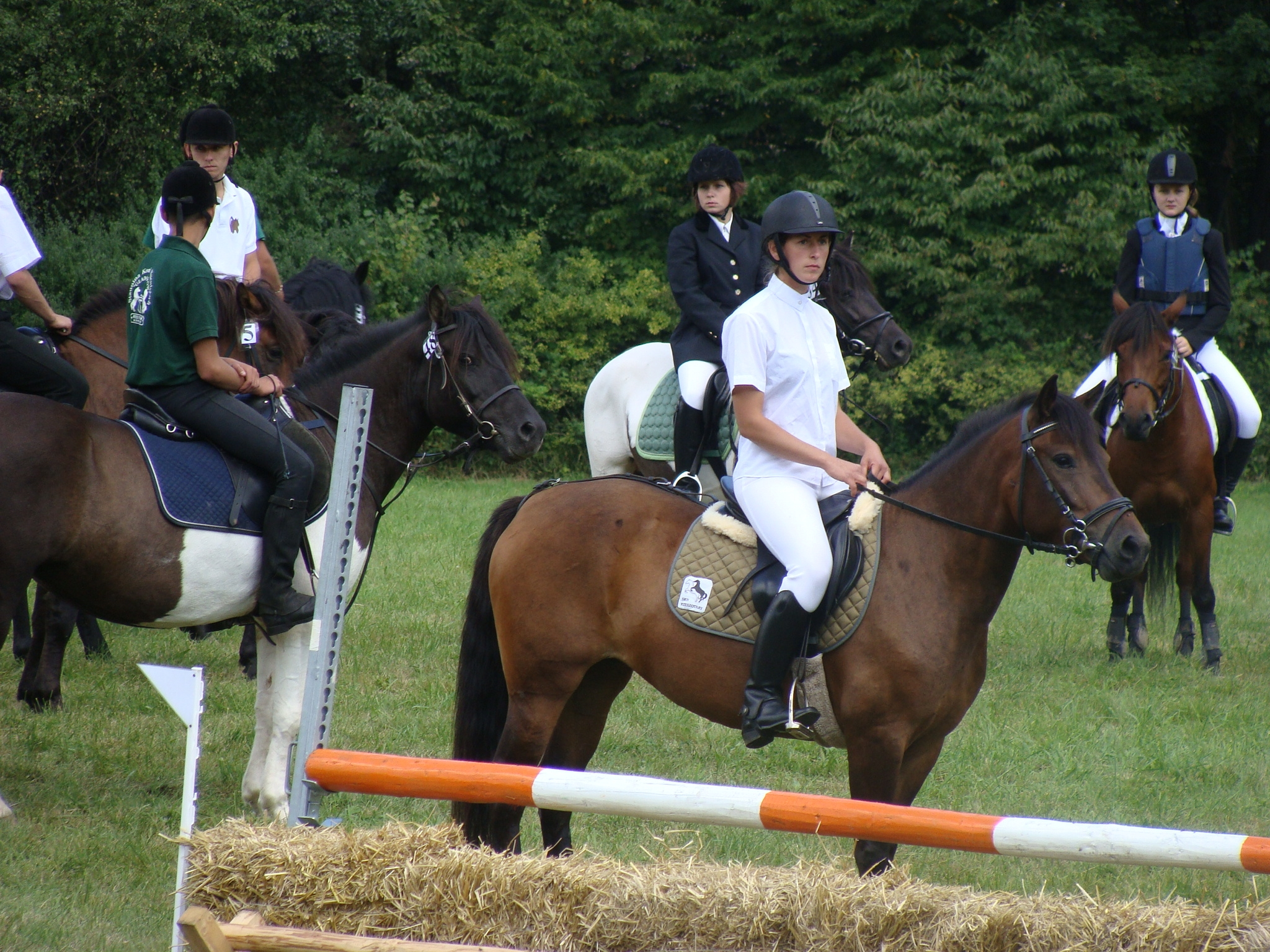
National Exposition of the Simmental Cattle and the Regional Championship of Hucul Horse. Rudawka Rymanowska. 2008.08.30

== Gallery ==
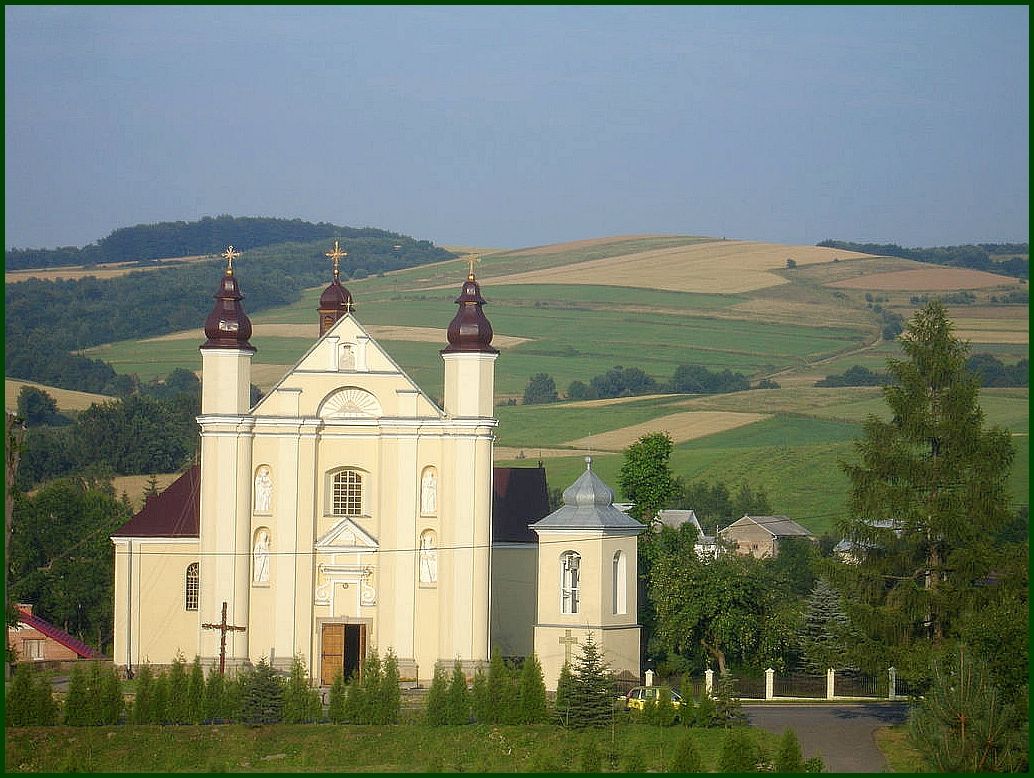

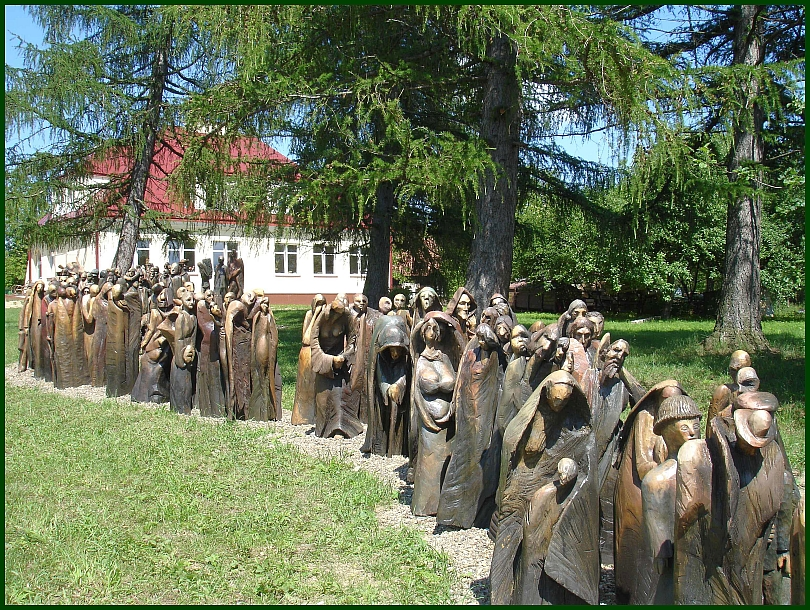

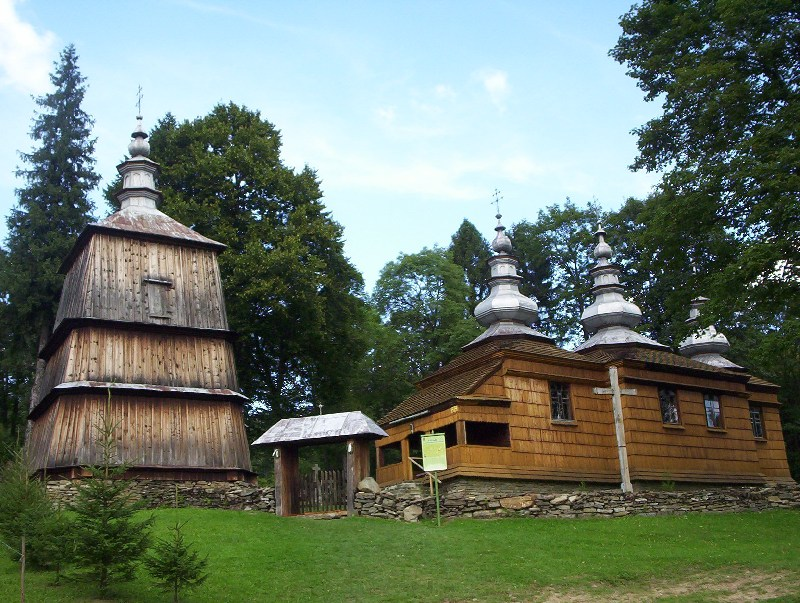

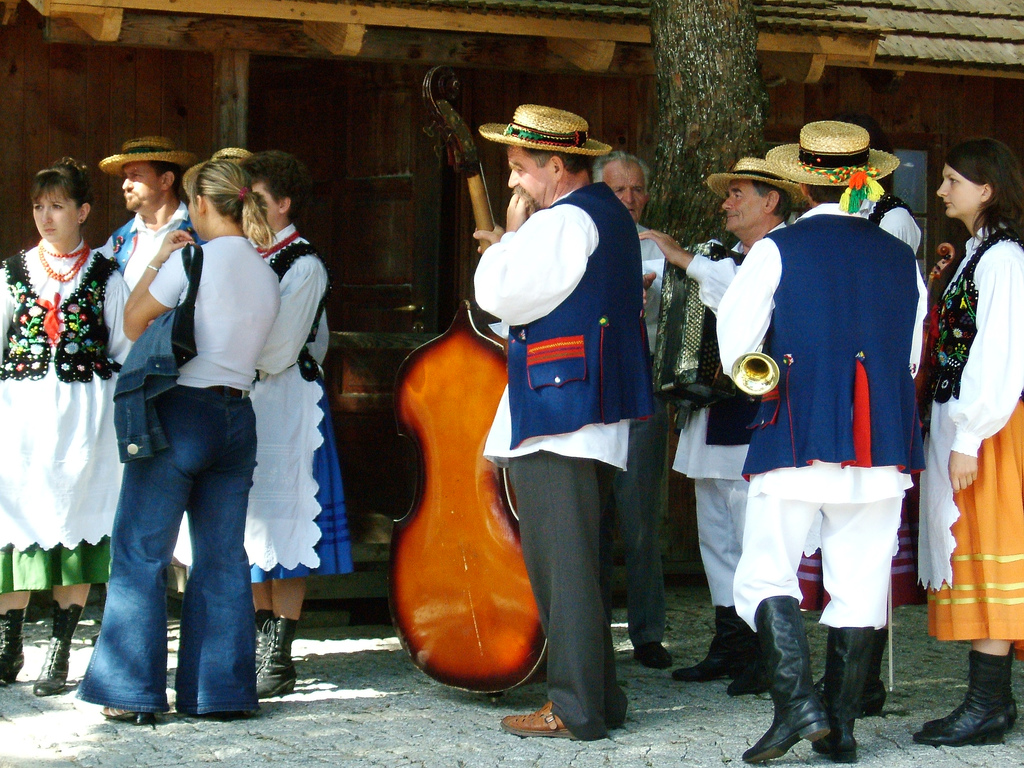

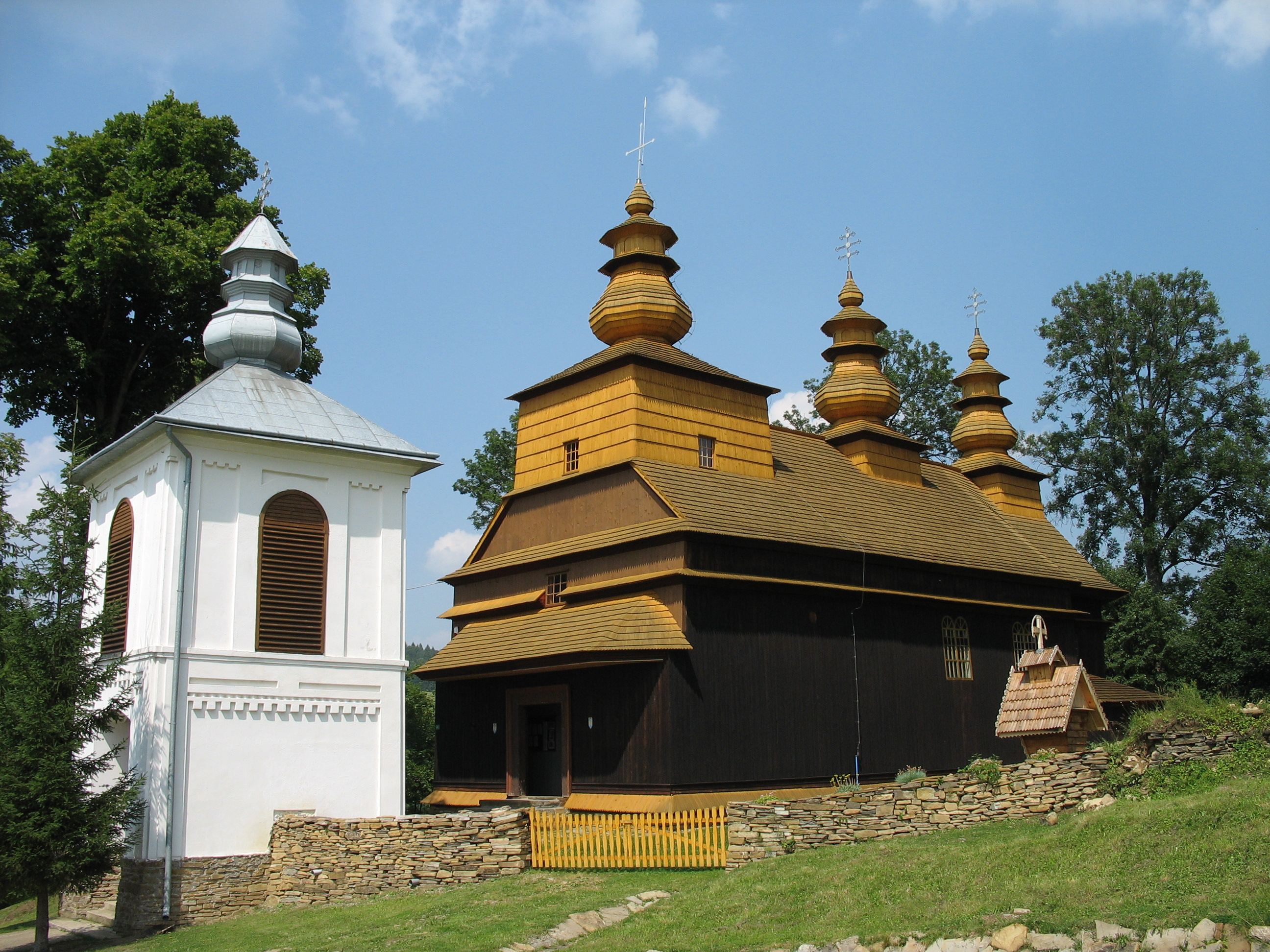

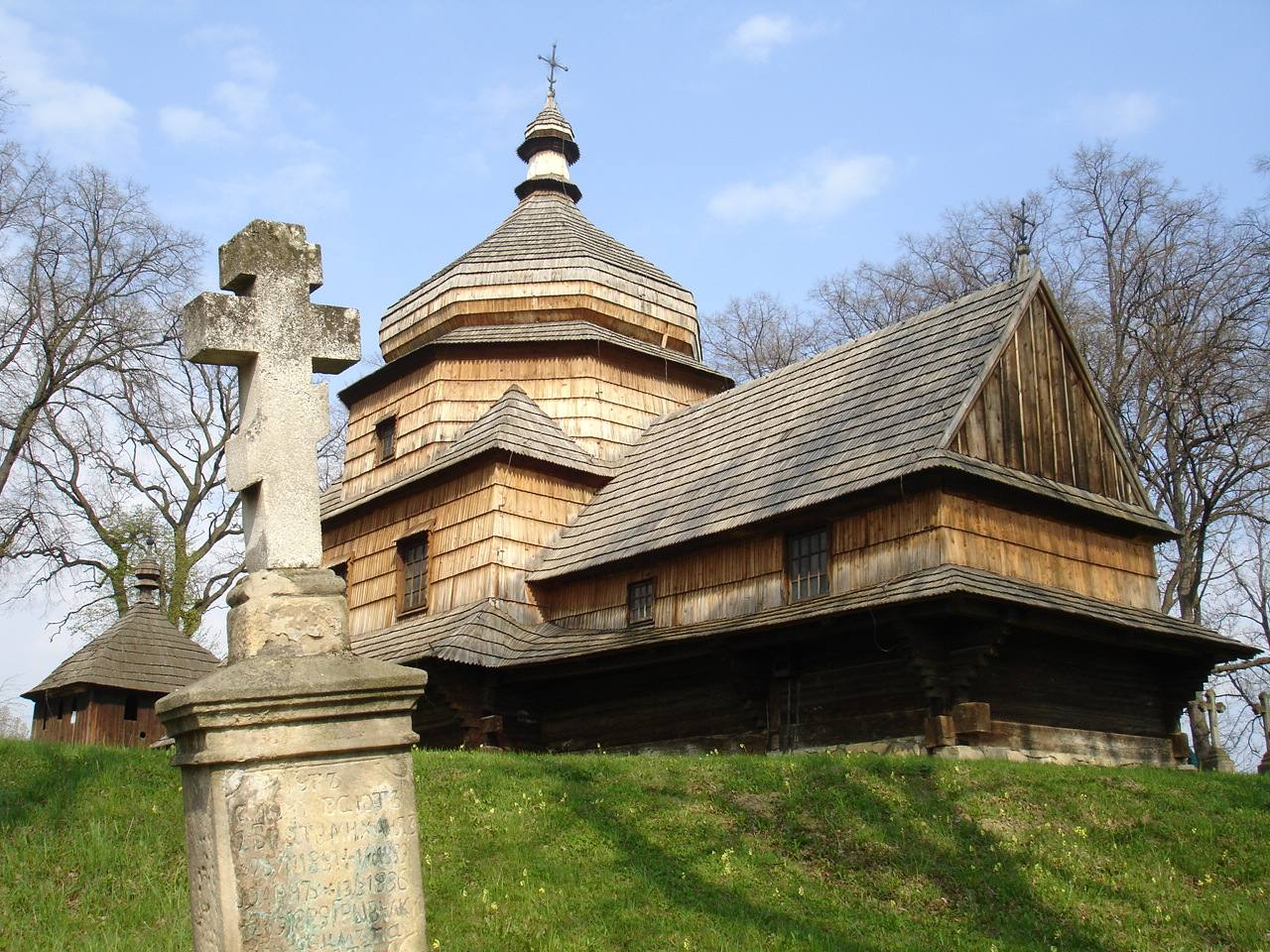

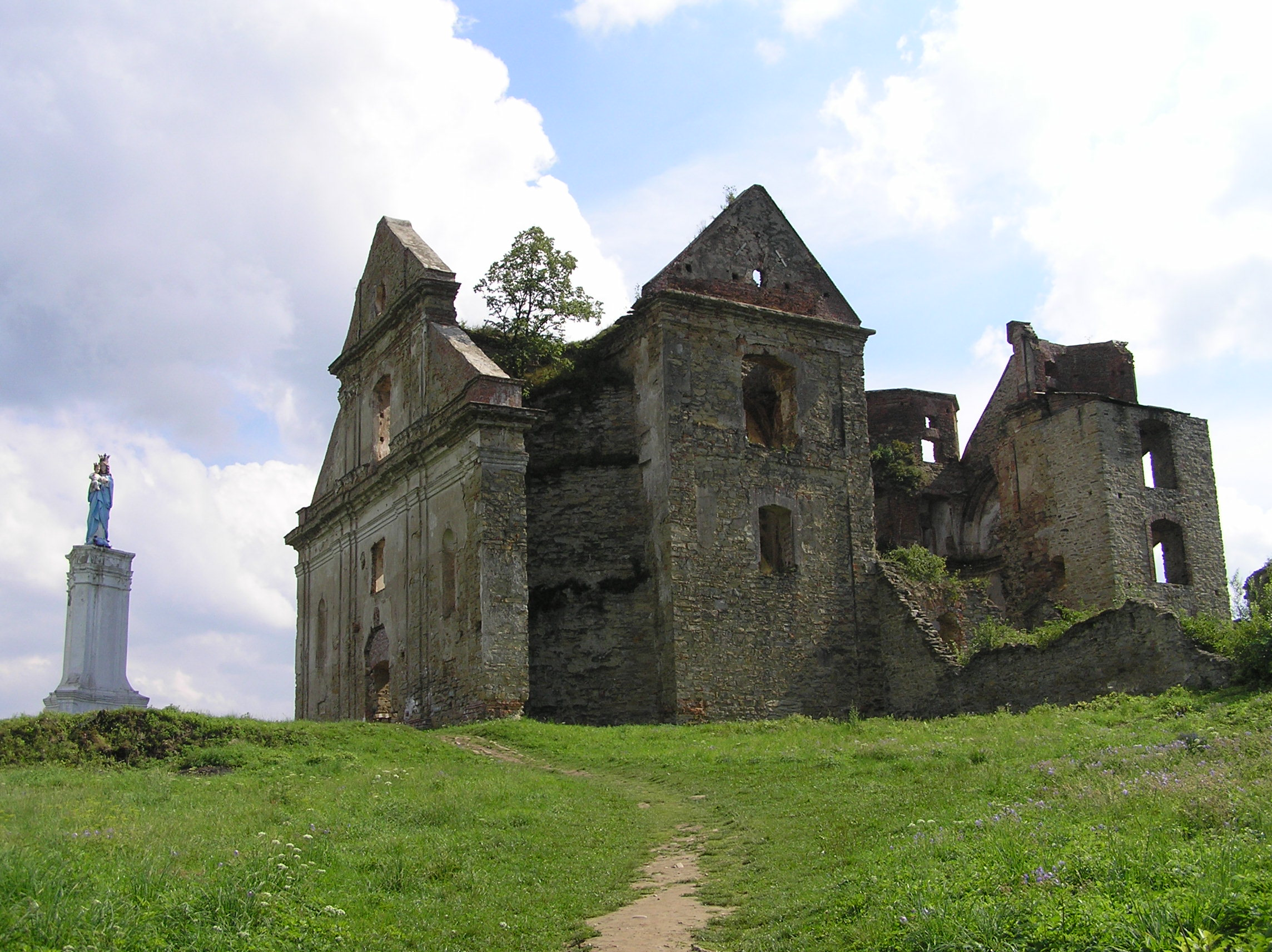

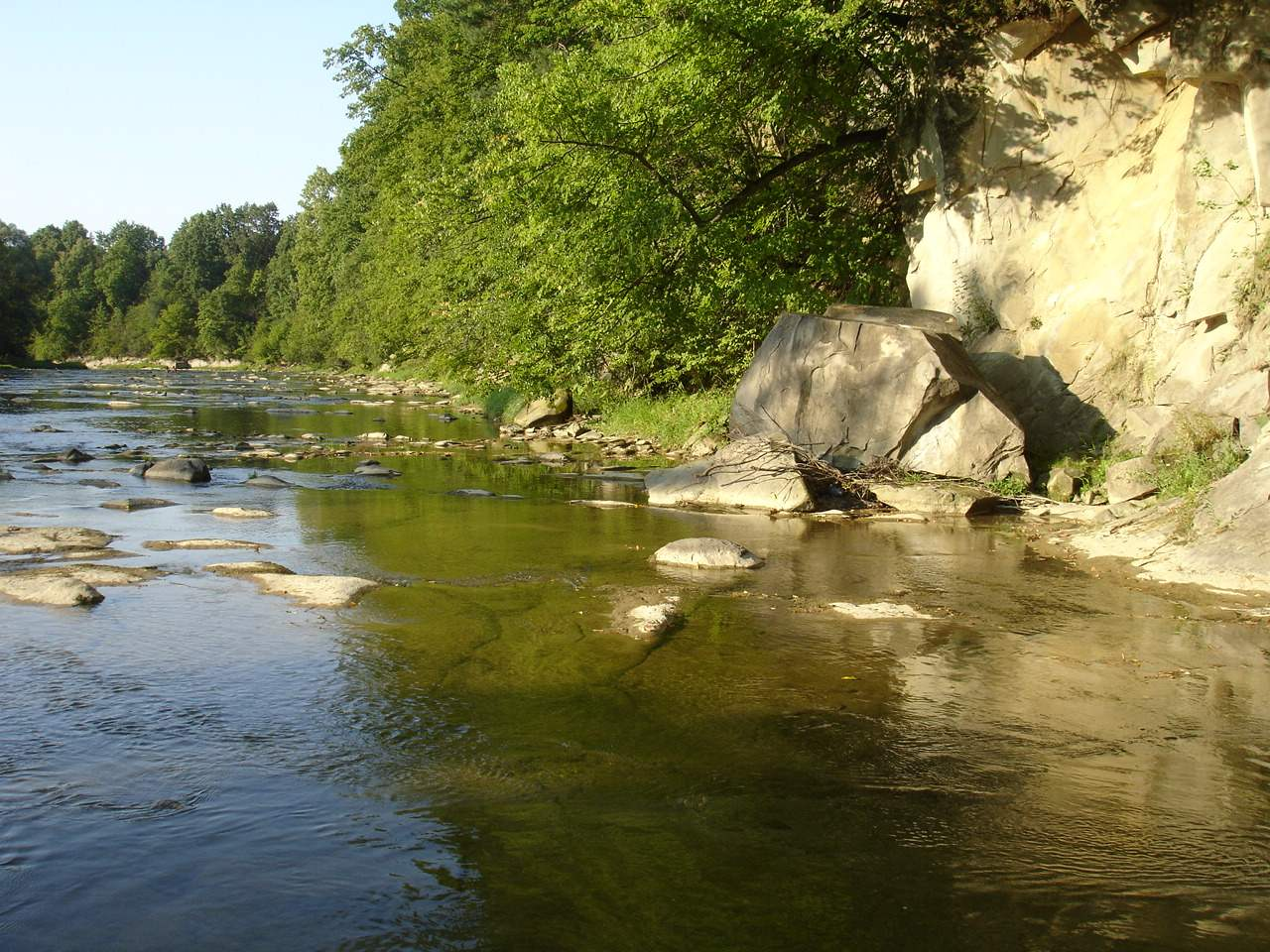

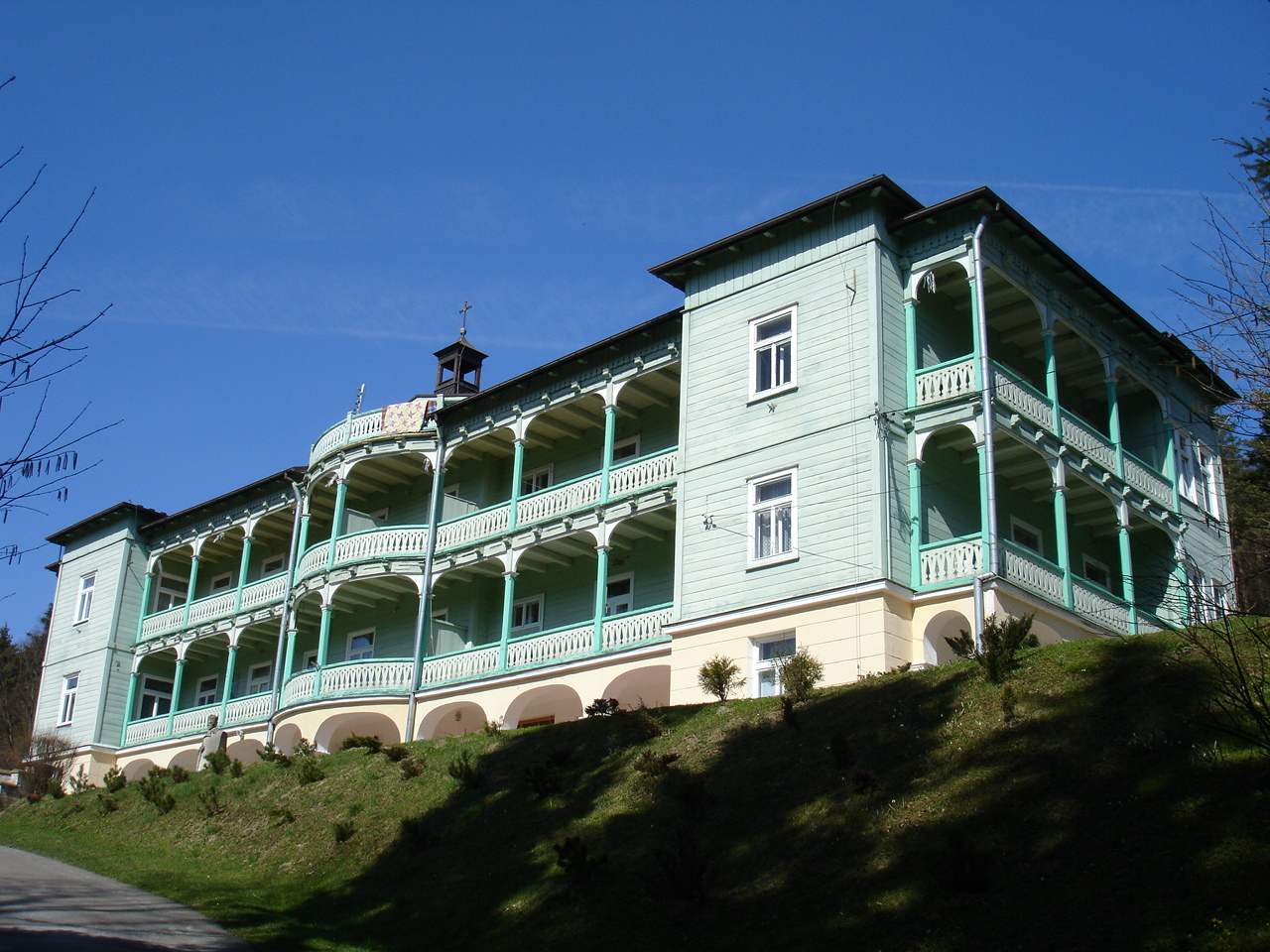

== Literature ==
- Prof. Adam Fastnacht. Slownik Historyczno-Geograficzny Ziemi Sanockiej w Średniowieczu (Historic-Geographic Dictionary of the Sanok District in the Middle Ages), Kraków, 2002, ISBN 83-88385-14-3.
- Prof. Jadwiga Warszyńska. Karpaty Polskie : przyroda, człowiek i jego działalność; Uniwersytet Jagielloński. Kraków, 1995 ISBN 83-233-0852-7
- Prof. Jerzy Kondracki. Geografia fizyczna Polski Warszawa : Państ. Wydaw. Naukowe, 1988, ISBN 83-01-02323-6
