= Rudawka Rymanowska =

- Village
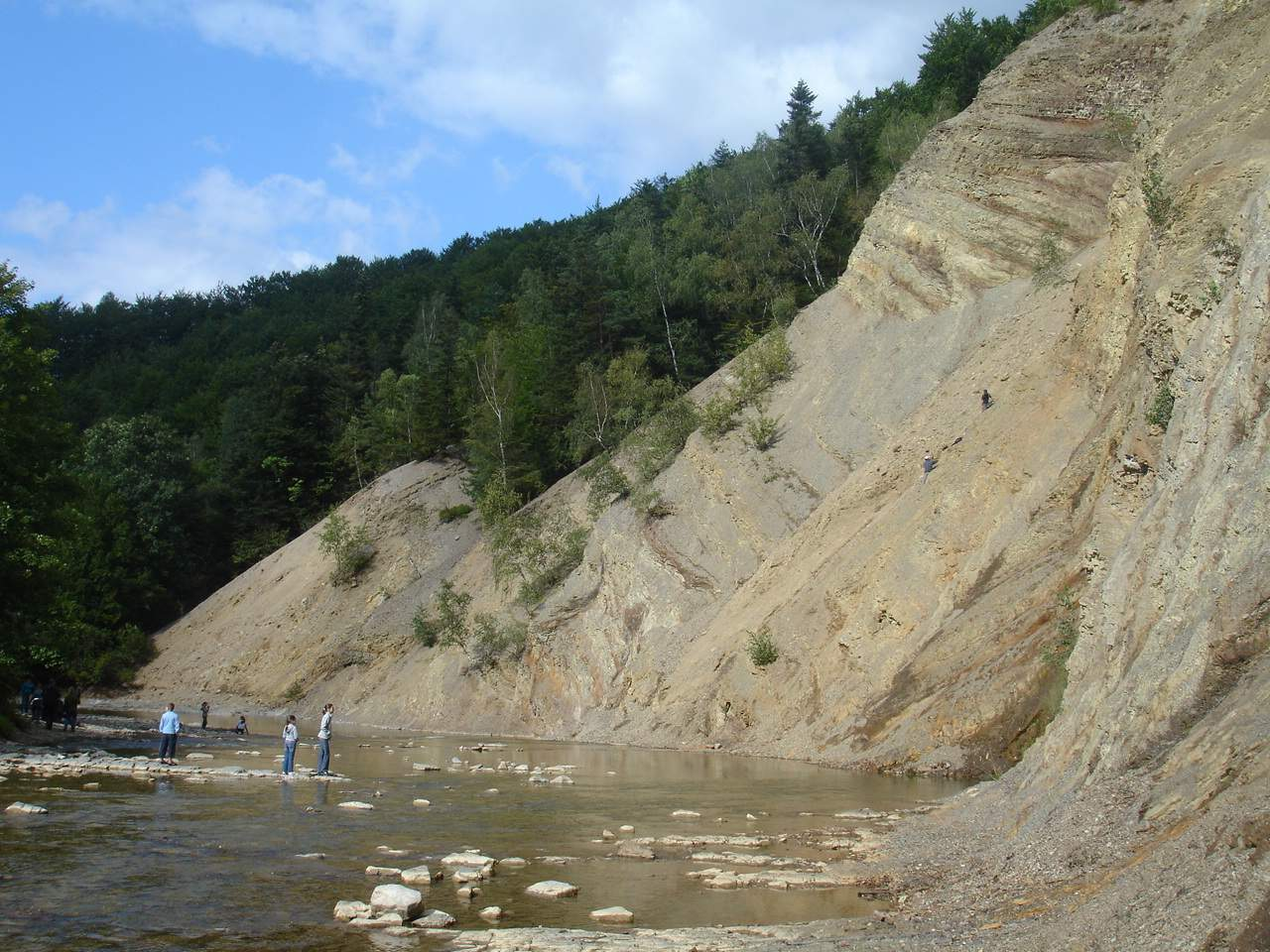

- Location within Poland
- Coordinates: 49°31′N 21°56′E
- Country: Poland
- Voivodeship: Subcarpathian
- County: Krosno
- Gmina: Rymanów
- Elevation: 430 m (1,410 ft)
- Population: 40

Rudawka Rymanowska [ruˈdafka rɨmaˈnɔfska] is a village in the administrative district of Gmina Rymanów, within Krosno County, Subcarpathian Voivodeship, in south-eastern Poland.

A small village situated in the northern part of Bukowskie Foothills over a picturesque gorge of the upper Wisłok River. A well-known part of John Paul II trail in the Low Beskid Mountains – Karol Wojtyła, the late Pope, took the trail six times during his summer vacations. His first visit took place in 1952, while his final stay ended only 70 days before the conclave at which he was elected Pope. These visits are commemorated by an obelisk erected near the local waterfall.

Every year, on last Sunday of August, the town hosts the National Exposition of the Simmental Cattle and the Regional Championship of Hucul Horse.

== National Exposition of the Simmental Cattle ==
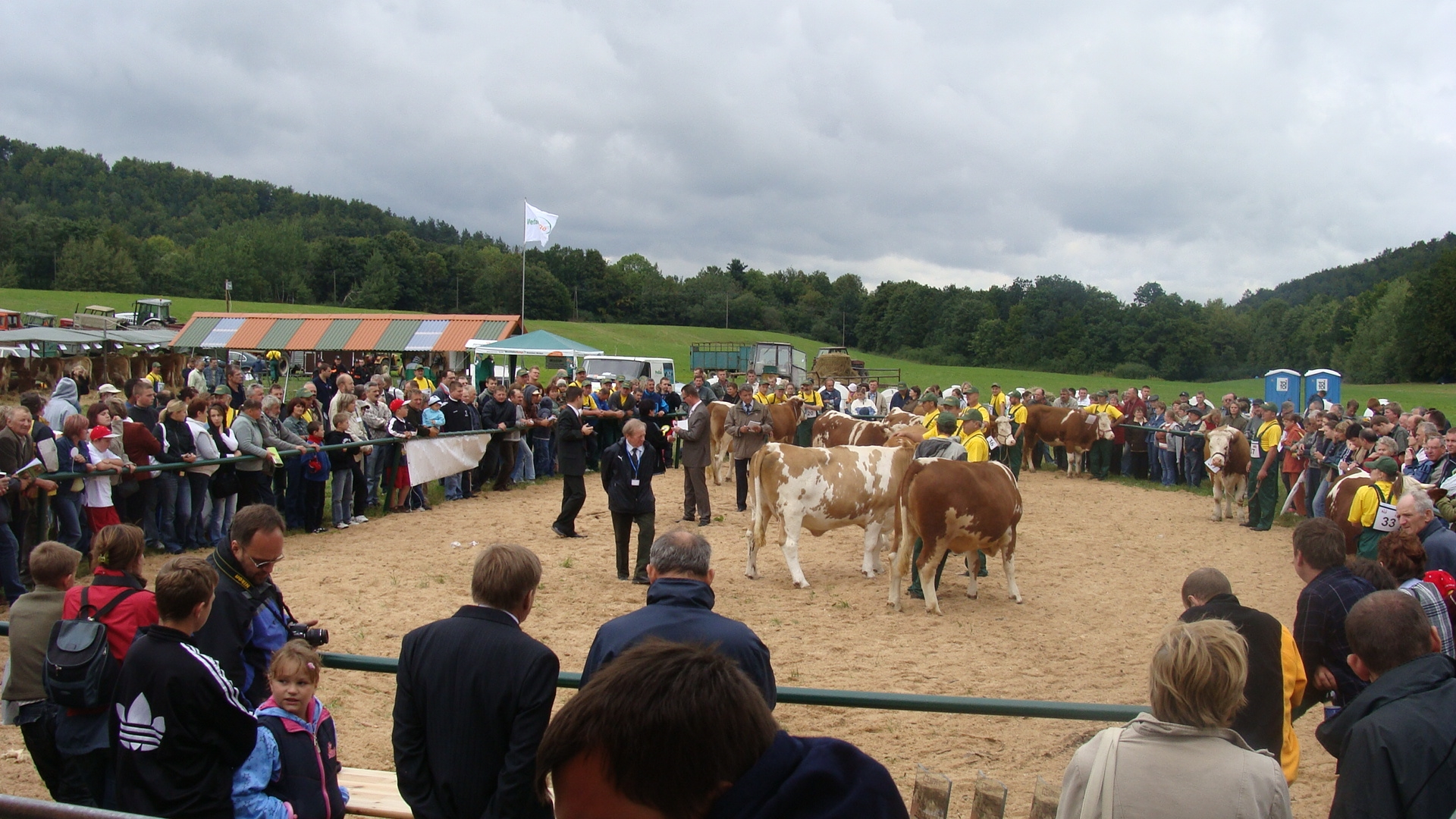
National Exposition of the Simmental Cattle and the Regional Championship of Hucul Horse.

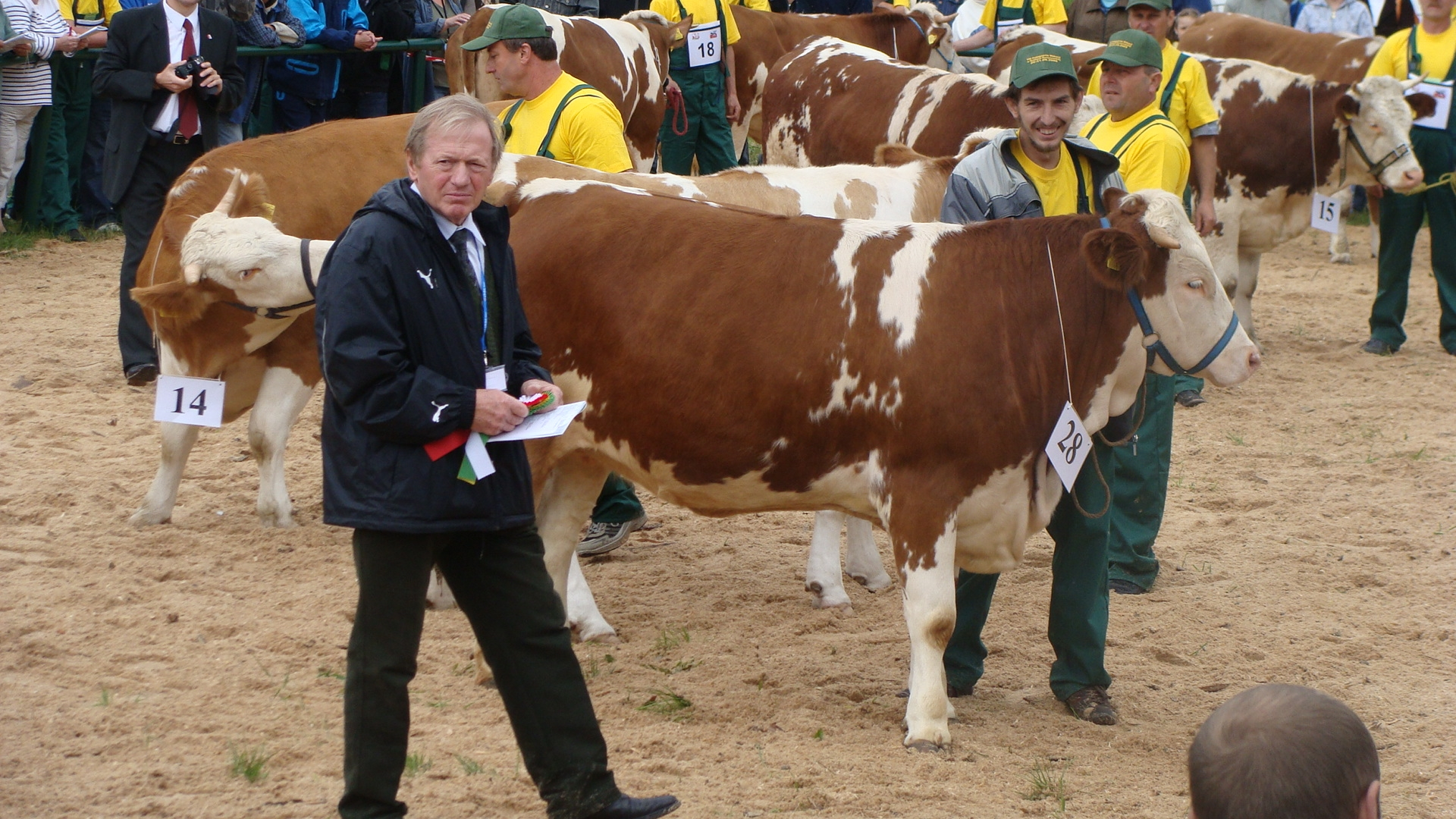
Dr Richard Pichler. National Exposition of the Simmental Cattle and the Regional Championship of Hucul Horse.

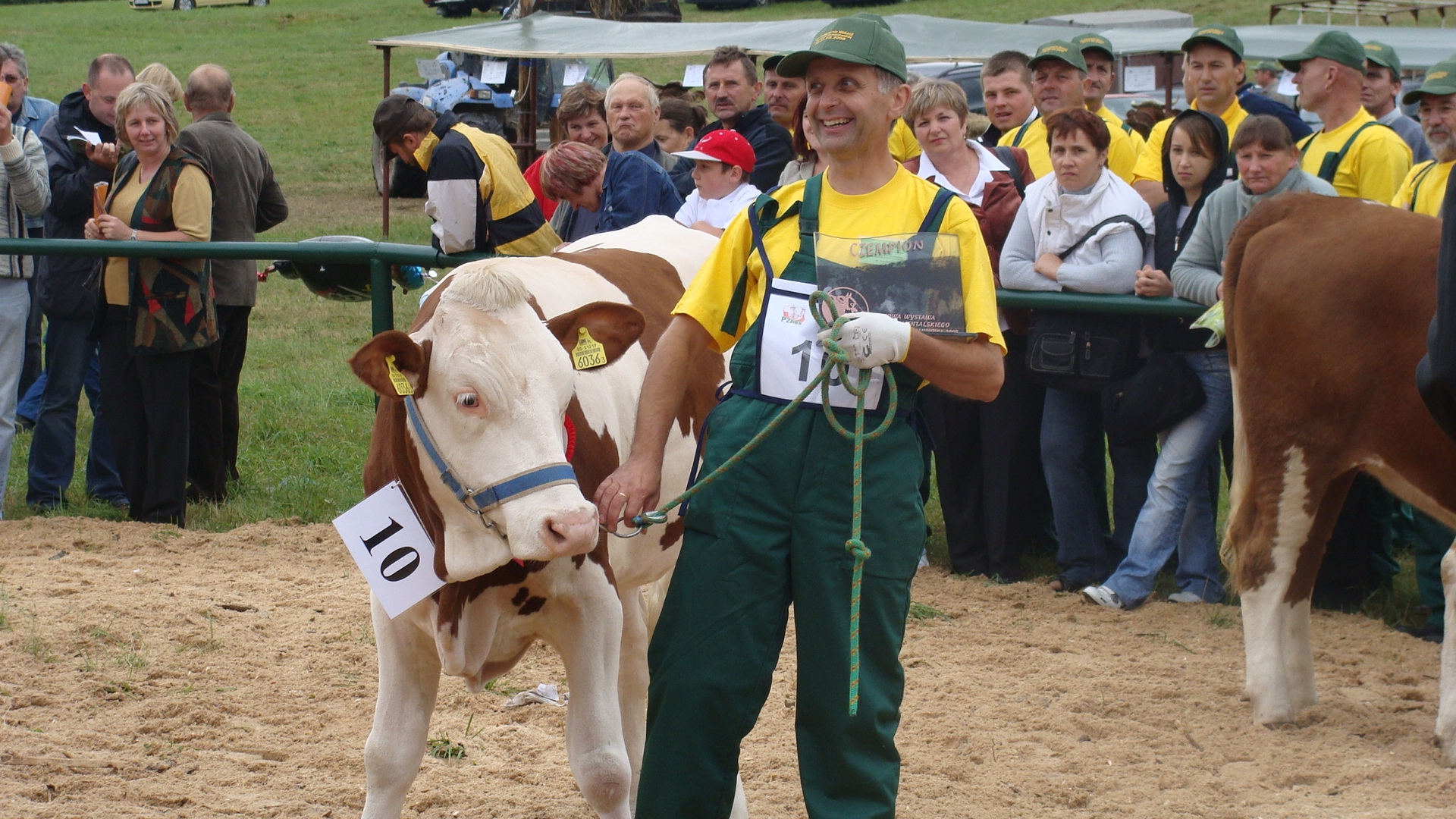
National Exposition of the Simmental Cattle and the Regional Championship of Hucul Horse.

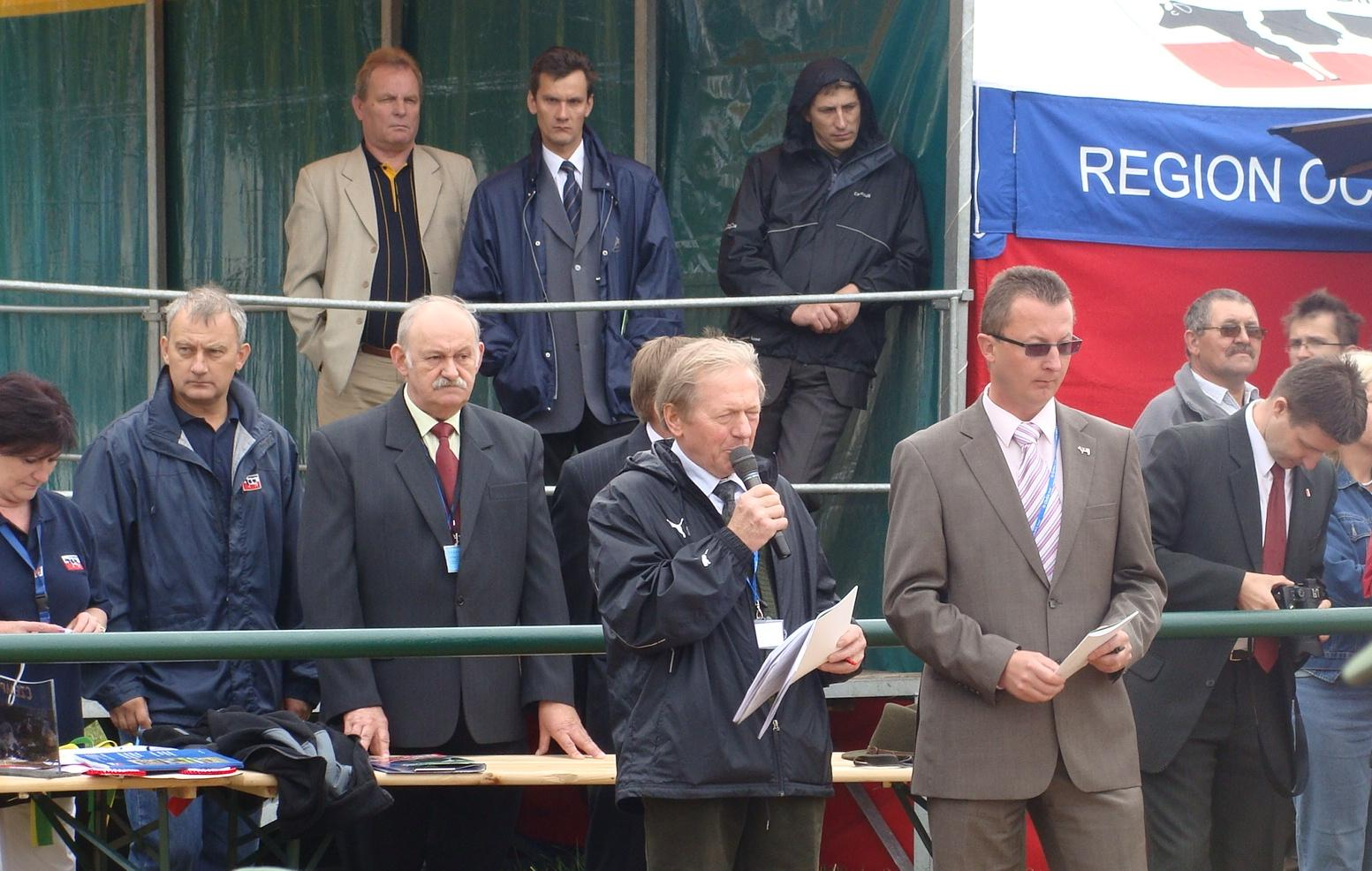
Mr Edgar Beneš Chairman of the Polish Simmental Cattle Breeders Association. National Exposition of the Simmental Cattle and the Regional Championship of Hucul Horse. Rudawka Rymanowska. 2008.08.30
