= Wola Piotrowa =

Wola Piotrowa (Lemko: Vola Petrova)
- Village
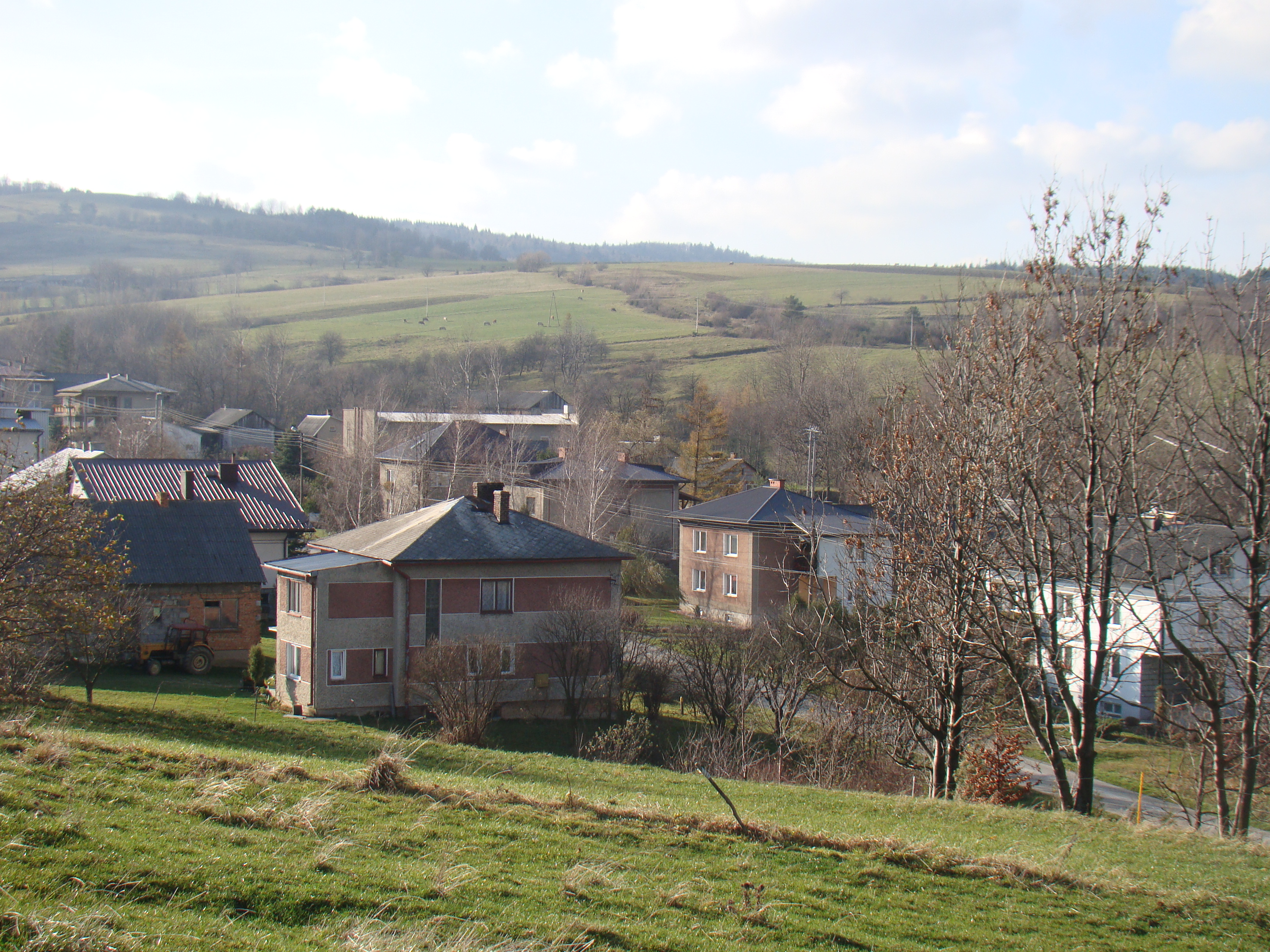
- The Pogórze Bukowskie is a hilly region (thus the name, Bukowsko hilly region) in Poland (Wola Piotrowa view.
- Etymology: Its name comes from the west slavic dialect word Wola and Piotr, meaning exactly little village of Peter
- Nickname: Piotrowa
- Location within Poland
- Coordinates: 49°27′4.89″N 22°02′37.25″E
- Country: Poland
- Voivodeship: Subcarpathian
- County: Sanok
- Gmina: Bukowsko
- First mentioned: 1526

Area
  - Total: 8.8 km^{2} (3.4 sq mi)
- Elevation: 270 m (890 ft)

Population (31 December 2002)
  - Total: 280
  - Density: 32/km^{2} (82/sq mi)
- Time zone: UTC+1 (CET)
  - Summer (DST): UTC+2 (CEST)
- Postal code: 38 507
- Car plate: KUS, RSA
- Website: http://www.bukowsko.pl

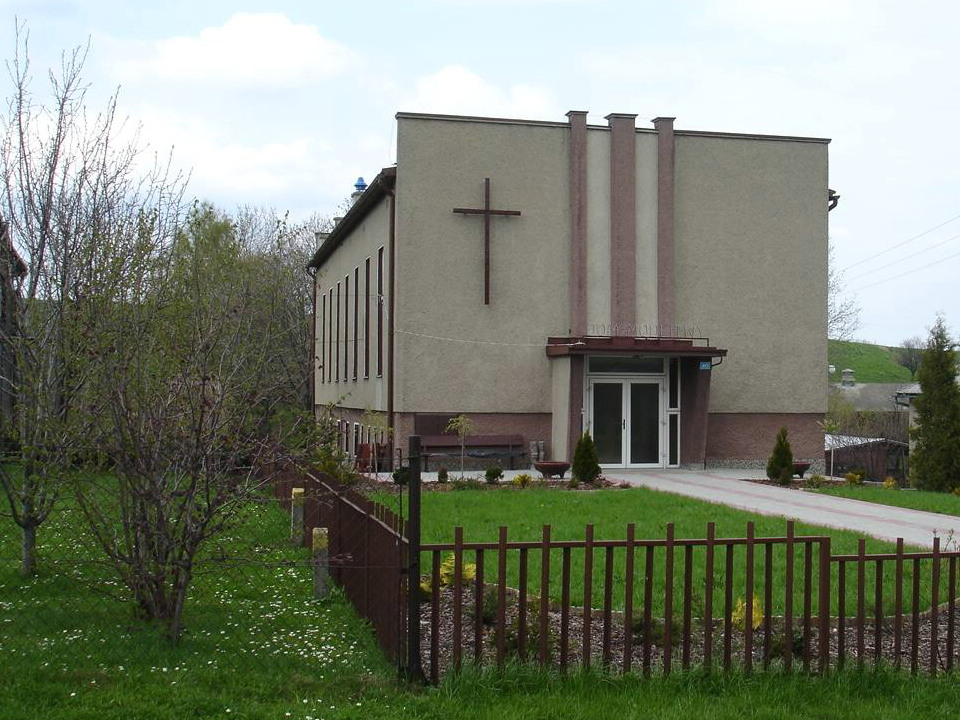
Pentecostal church in Wala Piotrowa

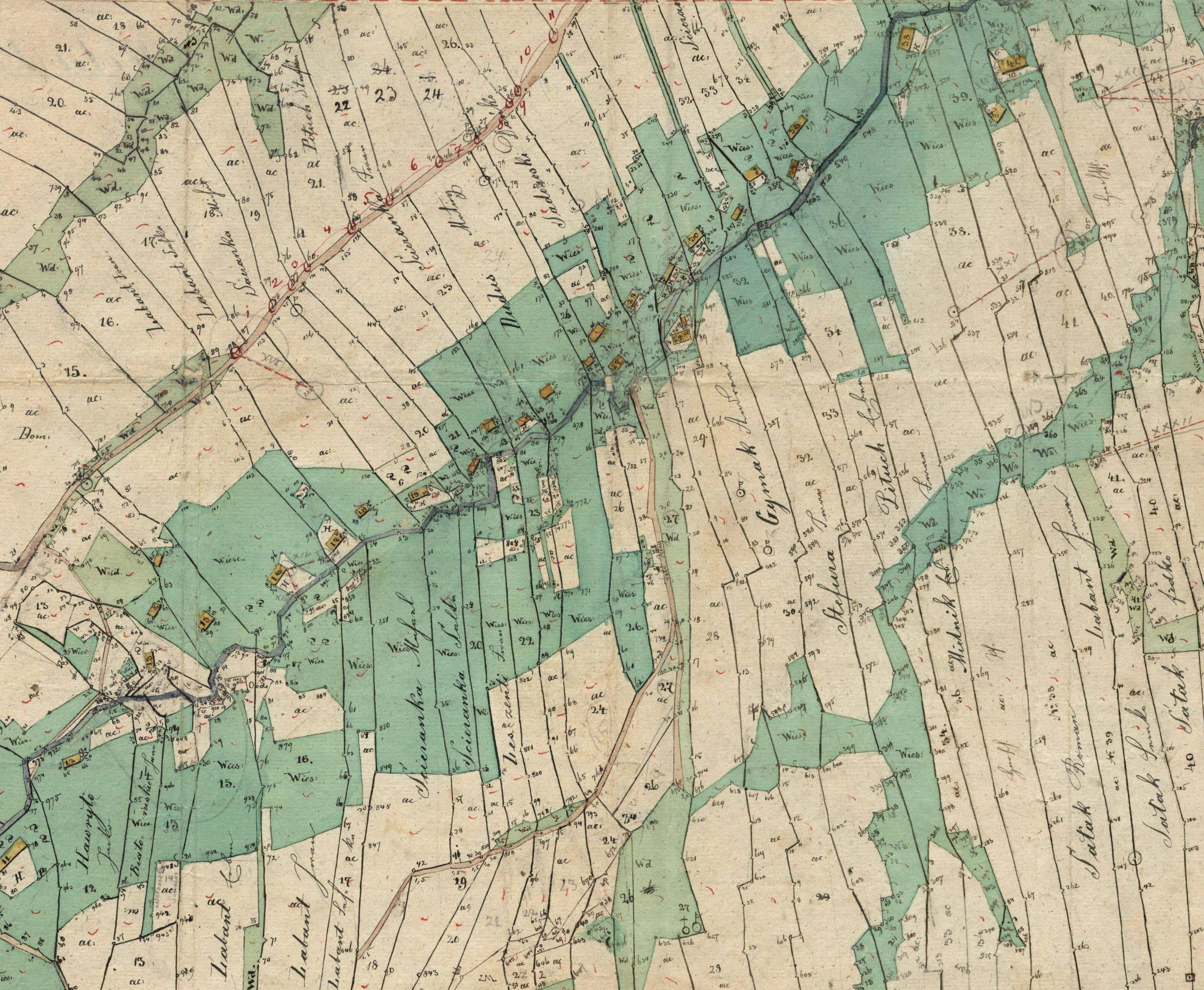
Cadastral map of Wola Piotrowa. Steurbezirk Bukowsko. 1853

Wola Piotrowa [ˈvɔla pʲɔˈtrɔva] is a village in East Małopolska in the Bukowsko Upland mountains, Bukowsko rural commune.

Wola Piotrowa is about 17 miles from Sanok in southeast Poland. It is situated below the main watershed at the foot of the Słonne Mountain, and has an elevation of 340 metres. Situated in the Subcarpathian Voivodship (since 1999), previously in Krosno Voivodship (1975-1998) and Sanok district, (10 miles east of Sanok), located near the towns of Medzilaborce and Palota (in northeastern Slovakia).

== Twin cities ==
- Topoľovka
- Maizières-lès-Metz

== Literature ==
- Tarnovich, Julian. Illustrated History of Lemkivshchyna. (Ukrainian Language Publication) Lviv, 1935, Reprinted in New York, NY 1964.
- Iwanusiw, Oleh Wolodymyr. Church in Ruins/Церква в руїнi (English/Ukrainian Edition) A Publication of St. Sophia Religious Association of Ukrainian Catholics in Canada, St. Catharines, 1987. Volya Petrova, retrieved March 8, 2012.
- Prof. Adam Fastnacht. Slownik Historyczno-Geograficzny Ziemi Sanockiej w Średniowieczu (Historic-Geographic Dictionary of the Sanok District in the Middle Ages), Kraków, 2002, ISBN 83-88385-14-3.
- Krasovsky, Ivan. Surnames of Galician Lemkos in the 18th Century. Lemko Foundation & Library, L'viv, 1993.
- Shematism of the Greek Catholic Apostolic Administration of Lemkivshchyna. (Ukrainian Language Publication.) Original Printing in 1936, Lviv. Reprinted in 1970 by the Ukrainian Museum & Library of Stamford, CT. See p. 6, entry on Karlykiv.
- Jerzy Zuba. "W Gminie Bukowsko." Roksana, 2004, ISBN 83-7343-150-0 (Polish). English translation of 1999 edition (ISBN 83-87282-84-7), Deborah Greenlee, Editor, 2005, Arlington, TX 76016.
