= Wolica, Sanok County =

Wolica Wolica
- Village
- Location within Poland
- Coordinates: 49°30′34″N 22°05′14″E
- Country: Poland
- Voivodeship: Subcarpathian
- County: Sanok
- Gmina: Bukowsko
- Founded: 1361

Area
  - Total: 8.8 km^{2} (3.4 sq mi)
- Elevation: 250 m (820 ft)

Population
  - Total: 200
- Time zone: UTC+1 (CET)
  - Summer (DST): UTC+2 (CEST)
- Postal code: 38500 (Bukowsko)

Wolica [vɔˈlʲit͡sa] is a village in East Małopolska in the Lesser Beskid mountains, located near the towns of Medzilaborce and Palota (in northeastern Slovakia).

Wolica is about 10 miles from Sanok in south-west Poland. It is situated below the main watershed at the foot of the Słonne Mountain, and has an elevation of 340 metres. Situated in the Subcarpathian Voivodship (since 1999), previously in Krosno Voivodship (1975-1998) and Sanok district, (10 miles east of Sanok), parish Bukowsko.

== History ==
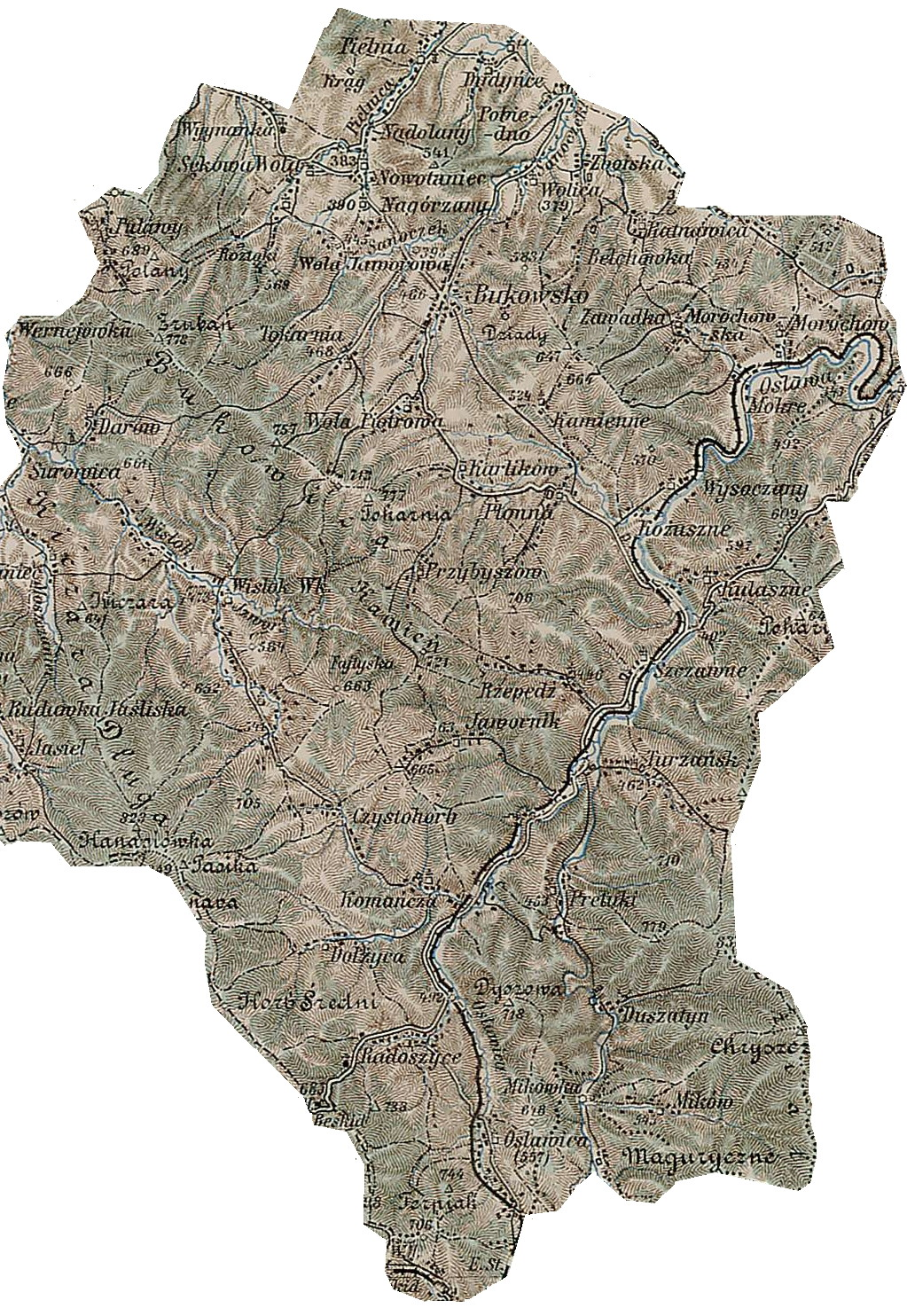
Gerichts-Bezirk ( Bukowsko Rural Commune) bis 1918. An 1898 map shows the location of Wolica (click in it to enlarge)

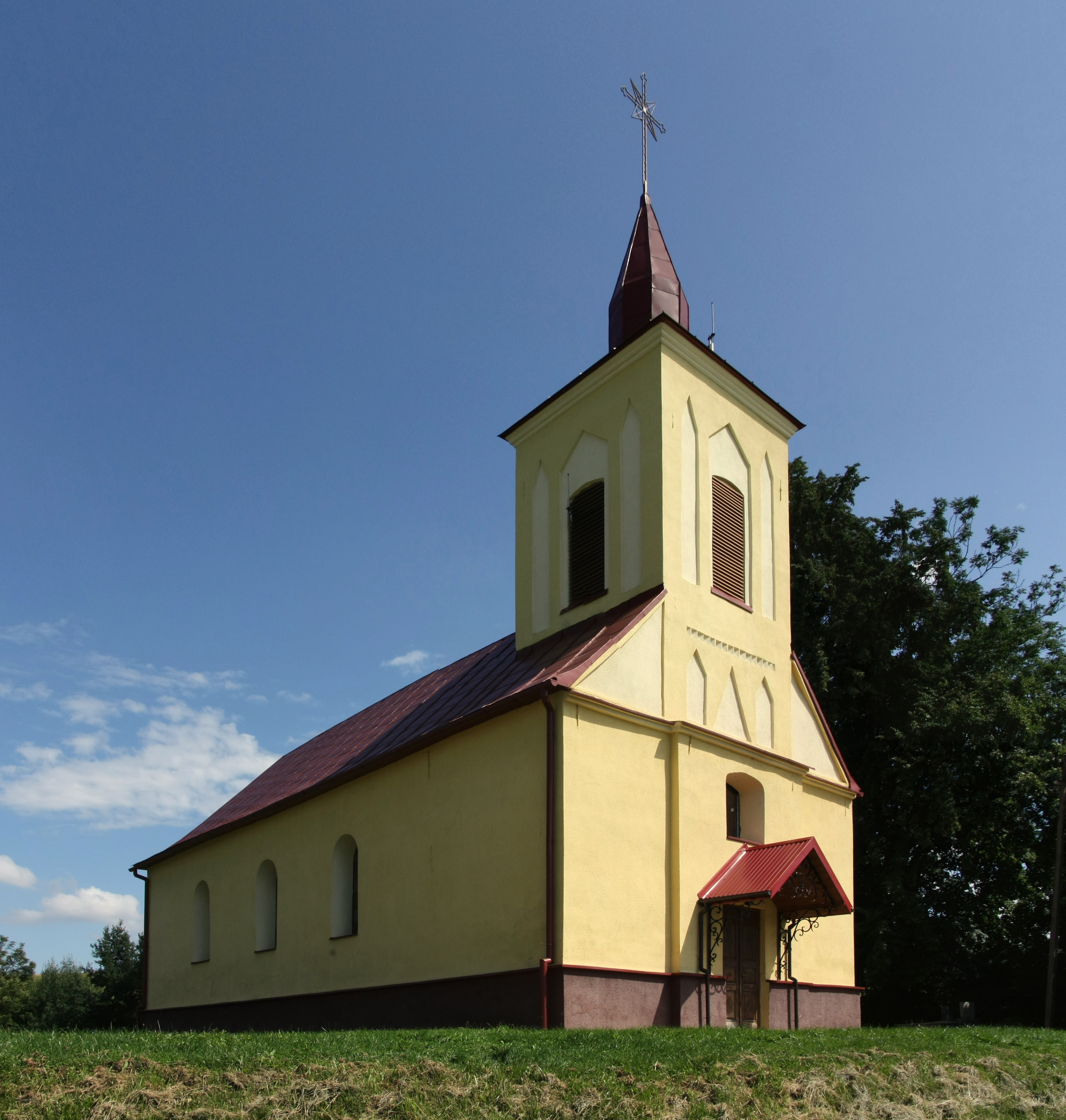
Church in Wolica

Wolica was founded in 1361 by Bals family. From 966 to 1018, 1340-1772 (Ruthenian Voivodeship) and from 1918 to 1939 Wolica was part of Poland. While during 1772-1918 it belonged to Austrian empire, later the Austrian-Hungarian empire.

The village was burned down in the spring 1946 by the UPA. Some people left Wolica on April 29, 1947 (Akcja Wisla) and moved to the Gdansk area of Poland. Some people went to Ukraine in 1946.

== Literature ==
- Adam Fastnacht, Nagórzany [in:] Slownik Historyczno-Geograficzny Ziemi Sanockiej w Średniowieczu (Historic-Geographic Dictionary of the Sanok District in the Middle Ages), Kraków, (II edition 2002), ISBN 83-88385-14-3.
- Jerzy Zuba "W Gminie Bukowsko". Roksana, 2004, ISBN 83-7343-150-0. Translated by Deborah Greenlee. Arlington, TX 76016.
