= Dudyńce =

Dudyńce Dudyńce
- Village
- Location within Poland
- Coordinates: 49°32′06″N 22°04′31″E
- Country: Poland
- Voivodeship: Subcarpathian
- County: Sanok
- Gmina: Bukowsko
- Founded: 1372

Area
  - Total: 8.8 km^{2} (3.4 sq mi)
- Elevation: 250 m (820 ft)

Population
  - Total: 200
- Time zone: UTC+1 (CET)
  - Summer (DST): UTC+2 (CEST)
- Postal code: 38500 (Bukowsko)

Dudyńce [duˈdɨɲt͡sɛ] is a village in East Małopolska in the Beskid mountains, Bukowsko rural commune. Dudyńce is located near the town of Sanok (now in southeastern Poland), and near the towns of Dukla and Palota (in northeastern Slovakia).

Dudyńce is about 10 miles from Sanok in southeast Poland. It is situated below the main watershed at the foot of the Słonne Mountain, and has an elevation of 250 metres. Situated in the Subcarpathian Voivodship (since 1999), previously in Krosno Voivodship (1975-1998) and Sanok District, (10 miles east of Sanok), parish Bukowsko.

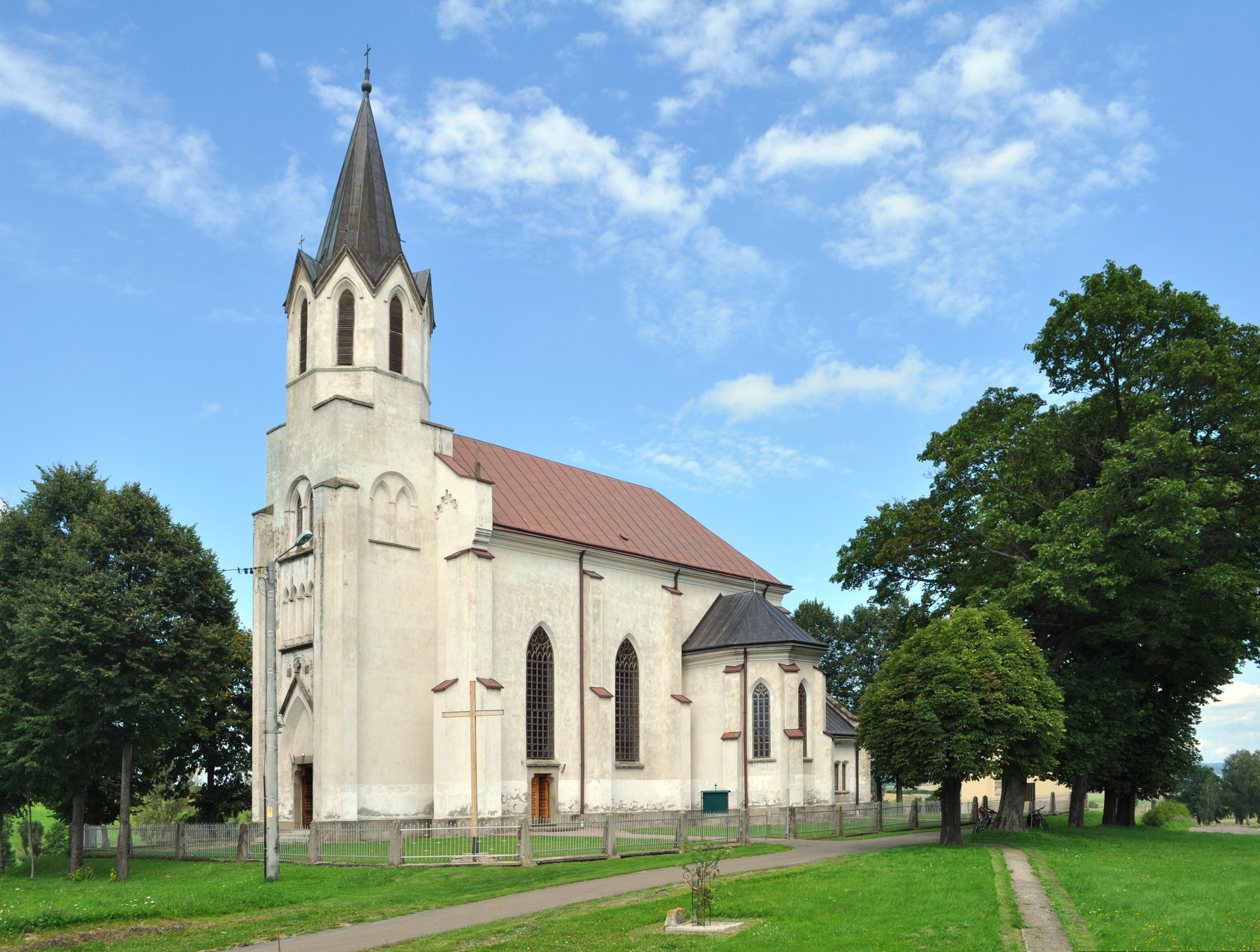
Church in Dudyńce

Dudyńce was founded in 1372 by prince Władysław Opolczyk. From 966 to 1018, 1340 to 1772 (Ruthenian Voivodeship) and from 1918 to 1939 Dudyńce was part of Poland. In 1772-1918 it belonged to Austrian empire, later the Austrian-Hungarian empire.

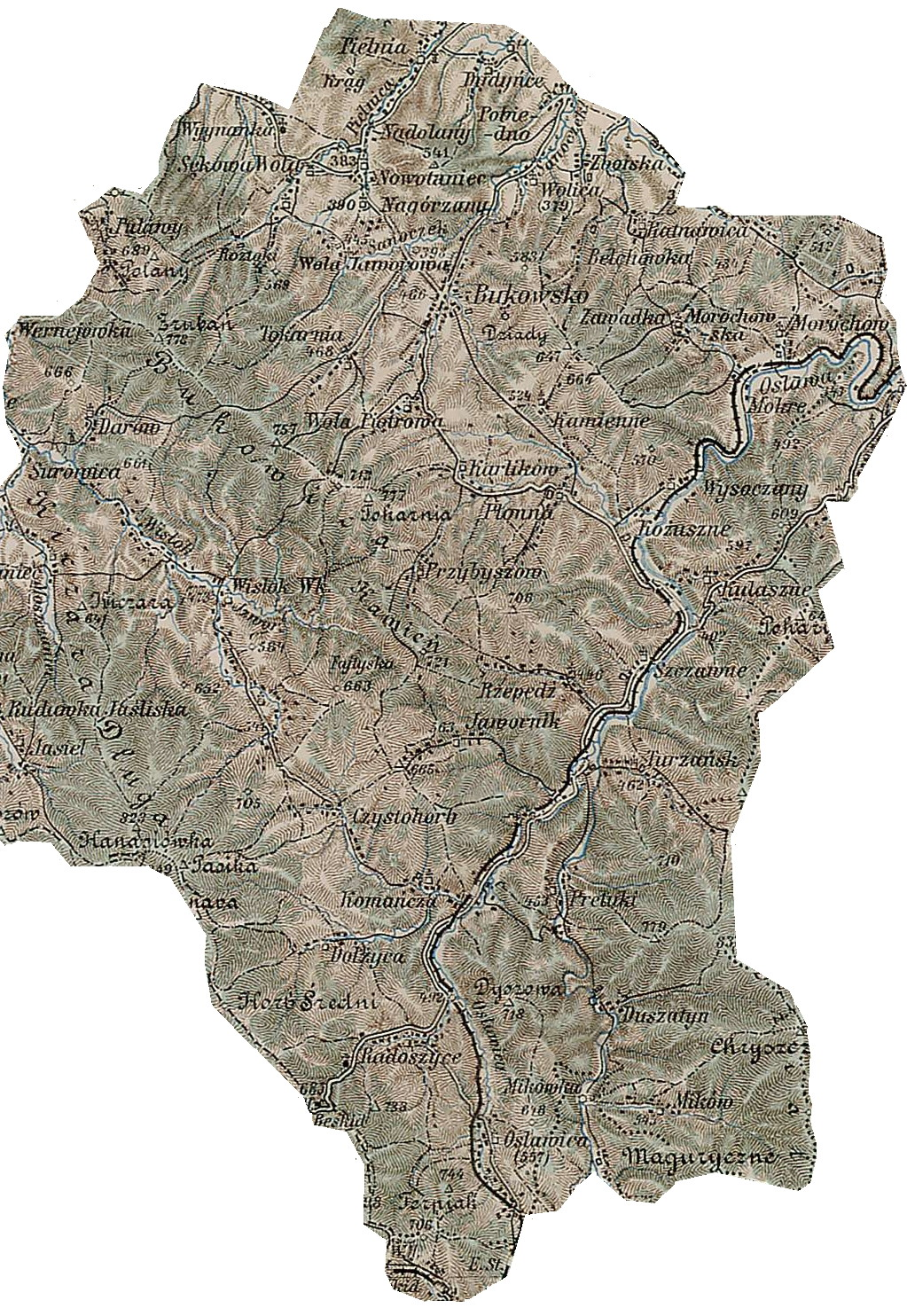
Gerichts-Bezirk Bukowsko bis 1918, Bukowsko Rural Commune. An 1898 map shows the location of Dudyńce (click to enlarge)

Historical population
Year	Pop.	±%
1880	920	—
1936	1,140	+23.9%
2001	200	−82.5%

== Literature ==
- Prof. Adam Fastnacht. Slownik Historyczno-Geograficzny Ziemi Sanockiej w Średniowieczu (Historic-Geographic Dictionary of the Sanok District in the Middle Ages), Kraków, 2002, ISBN 83-88385-14-3.
- Jerzy Zuba "W Gminie Bukowsko". Roksana, 2004, ISBN 83-7343-150-0. Translated by Deborah Greenlee. Arlington, TX 76016.
