= Zboiska, Sanok County =

Zboiska Zboiska
- village
- Location within Poland
- Coordinates: 49°30′43″N 22°06′36″E
- Country: Poland
- Voivodeship: Subcarpathian
- County: Sanok
- Gmina: Bukowsko
- Founded: 1361

Area
  - Total: 8.8 km^{2} (3.4 sq mi)
- Elevation: 250 m (820 ft)

Population
  - Total: 220
- Time zone: UTC+1 (CET)
  - Summer (DST): UTC+2 (CEST)
- Postal code: 38507

Zboiska [zbɔˈiska] (Ukrainian: Збоїська, Zboyis’ka) – Boyscza 1361, Boyska 1398, Boyschcze 1402, Bogiska 1437, Szboyska 1539, Zboiska alias Uhrynowce 1676, is a village in East Małopolska in the Lesser Beskid mountains. It is in the Bukowsko rural commune and the parish of Bukowsko.

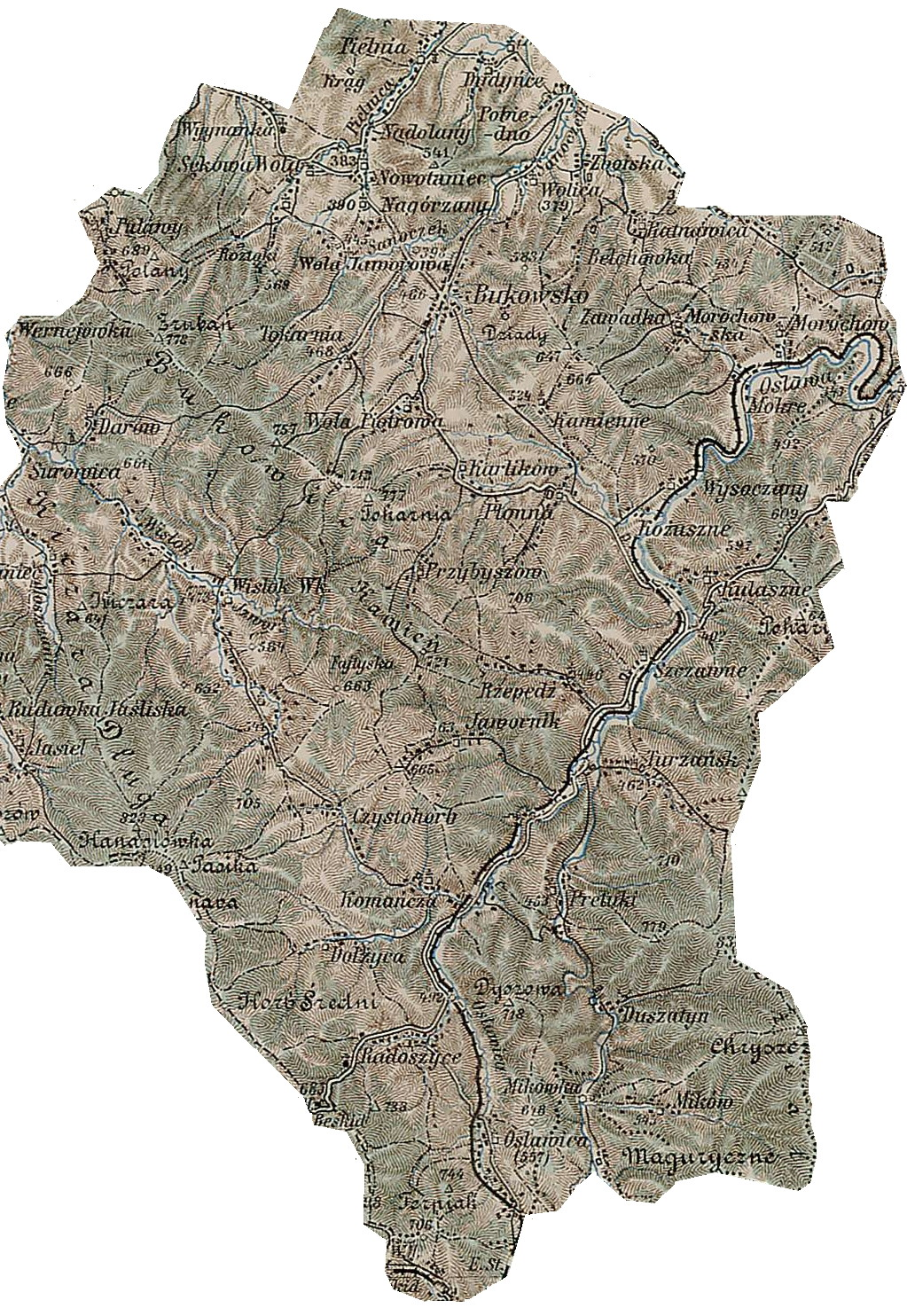
Gerichts-Bezirk (Bukowsko Rural Commune) Bukowsko bis 1918. An 1898 map shows the location of Zboiska (click in it to enlarge)

Zboiska is about 10 miles from Sanok in south-west Poland. It is situated below the main watershed at the foot of the Słonne Mountain, and has an elevation of 340 metres. It is located in the Subcarpathian Voivodship (since 1999), but was previously in Krosno Voivodship (1975–1998) and Sanok district, (10 miles east of Sanok).

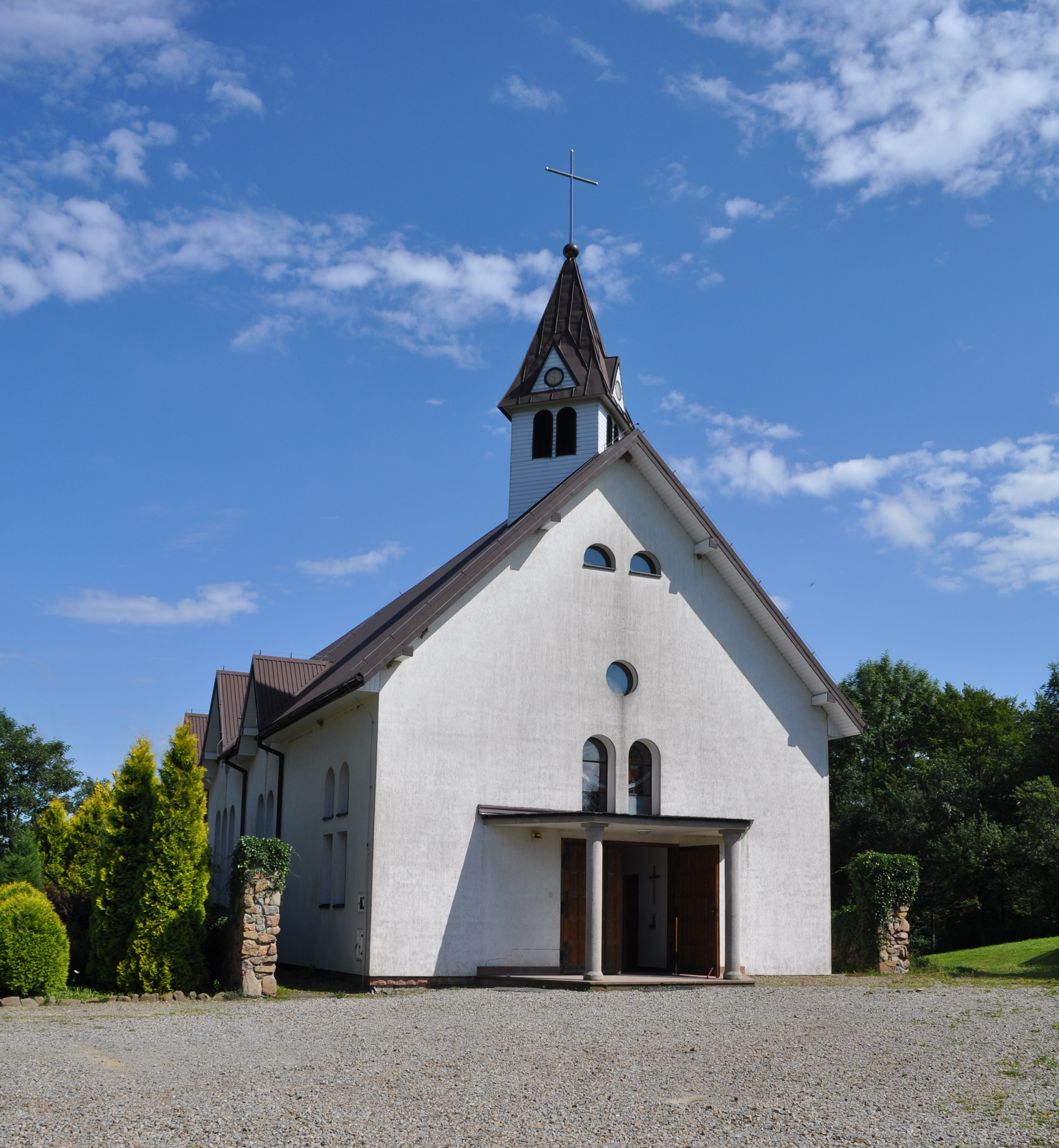
Church in Zboiska

== Twin cities ==
- Topoľovka
- Maizières-lès-Metz, France

== Literature ==
- Adam Fastnacht, Nagórzany [in:] Slownik Historyczno-Geograficzny Ziemi Sanockiej w Średniowieczu (Historic-Geographic Dictionary of the Sanok District in the Middle Ages), Kraków, (II edition 2002), ISBN 83-88385-14-3.
- Jerzy Zuba "W Gminie Bukowsko". Roksana, 2004, ISBN 83-7343-150-0. Translated by Deborah Greenlee. Arlington, TX 76016.
