= Pobiedno =

Polish village in Subcarpathian Voivodship

- village
- Location within Poland
- Coordinates: 49°31′38″N 22°06′23″E
- Country: Poland
- Voivodeship: Subcarpathian
- County: Sanok
- Gmina: Bukowsko
- Founded: 1366

Area
  - Total: 6.3 km^{2} (2.4 sq mi)
- Elevation: 482 m (1,581 ft)

Population
  - Total: 200
- Time zone: UTC+1 (CET)
  - Summer (DST): UTC+2 (CEST)
- Postal code: 38500

Pobiedno [pɔˈbʲɛdnɔ] is a village in Sanok County, which in turn is a part of Bukowsko rural commune in Nowotaniec parish. Geographically, the village is in the East Małopolska region of Poland and in the Lesser Beskid mountains. Nearby towns include Medzilaborce and Palota of northeastern Slovakia.

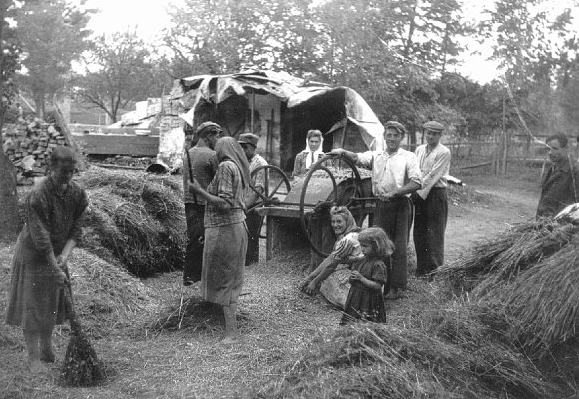
Village Pobiedno, 1946
