= Tokarnia =

Tokarnia may refer to the following places in Poland:

- Tokarnia, Lesser Poland Voivodeship (south Poland)
- Tokarnia, Sanok County in Subcarpathian Voivodeship (south-east Poland)
- Tokarnia, Świętokrzyskie Voivodeship (south-central Poland)
- Tokarnia (mountain), in the Bukowica Range (south-east Poland)
