= Karlików =

Lemko village in Poland

Karlików Карликів
- Village
- Location within Poland
- Coordinates: 49°26′04″N 22°04′01″E
- Country: Poland
- Voivodeship: Subcarpathian
- County: Sanok
- Gmina: Bukowsko
- Founded: 1483

Area
  - Total: 8.8 km^{2} (3.4 sq mi)
- Elevation: 290 m (950 ft)

Population
  - Total: 120
- Time zone: UTC+1 (CET)
  - Summer (DST): UTC+2 (CEST)
- Postal code: 38507

Karlików (Карликів) is a village situated in the Podkarpackie Voivodeship in south-eastern Poland; previously in Krosno Voivodship (1975–1998) and Sanok district, (10 mi or 16 km east of Sanok). Karlików is about 10 mi (16 km) from Sanok. It is situated below the main watershed at the foot of the Słonne Mountain, and has an elevation of 340 m (1,115 ft).

== History ==
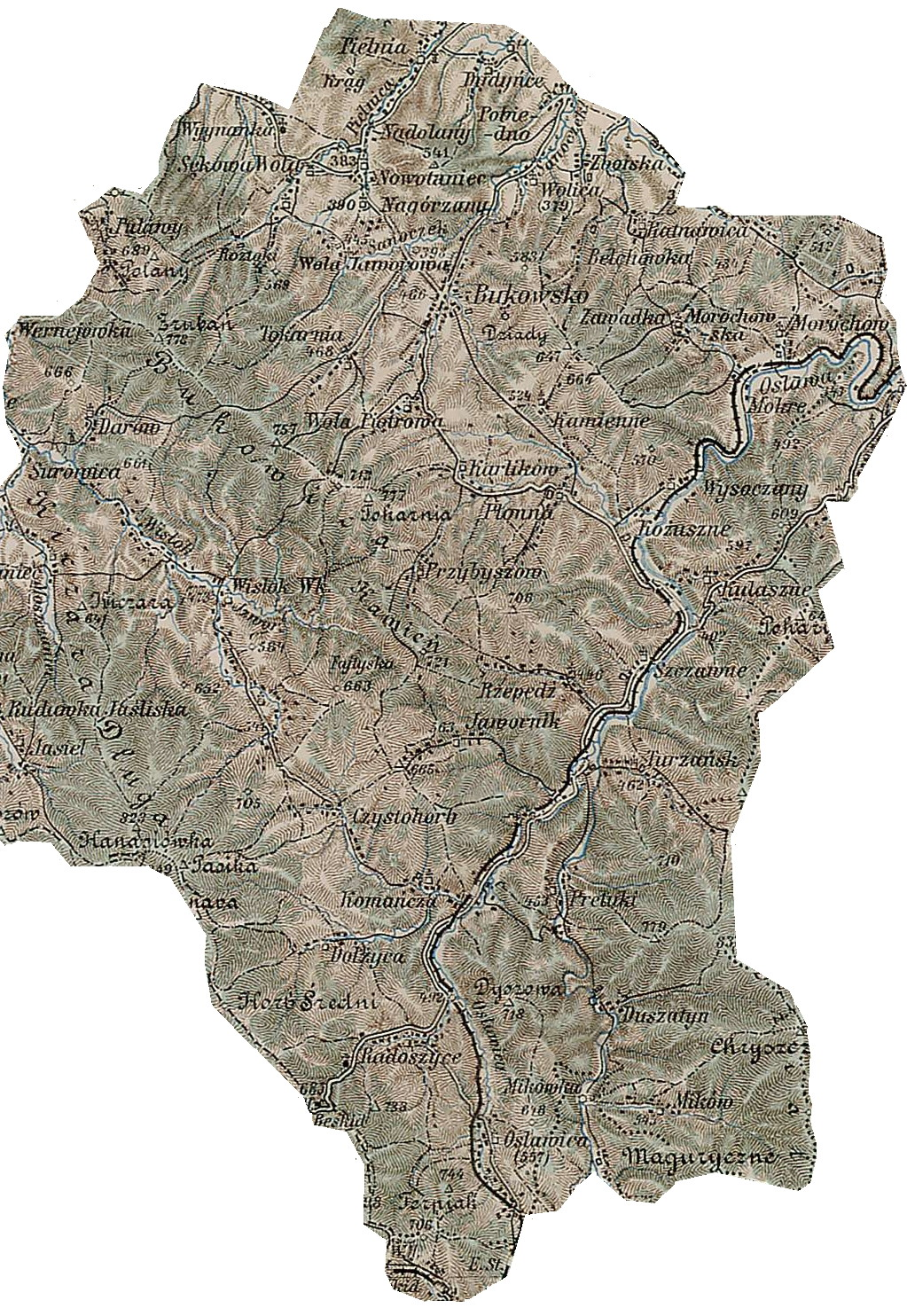
Gerichts-Bezirk ( Bukowsko Rural Commune) Bukowsko bis 1918. An 1898 map shows the location of Karlików (click in it to enlarge).

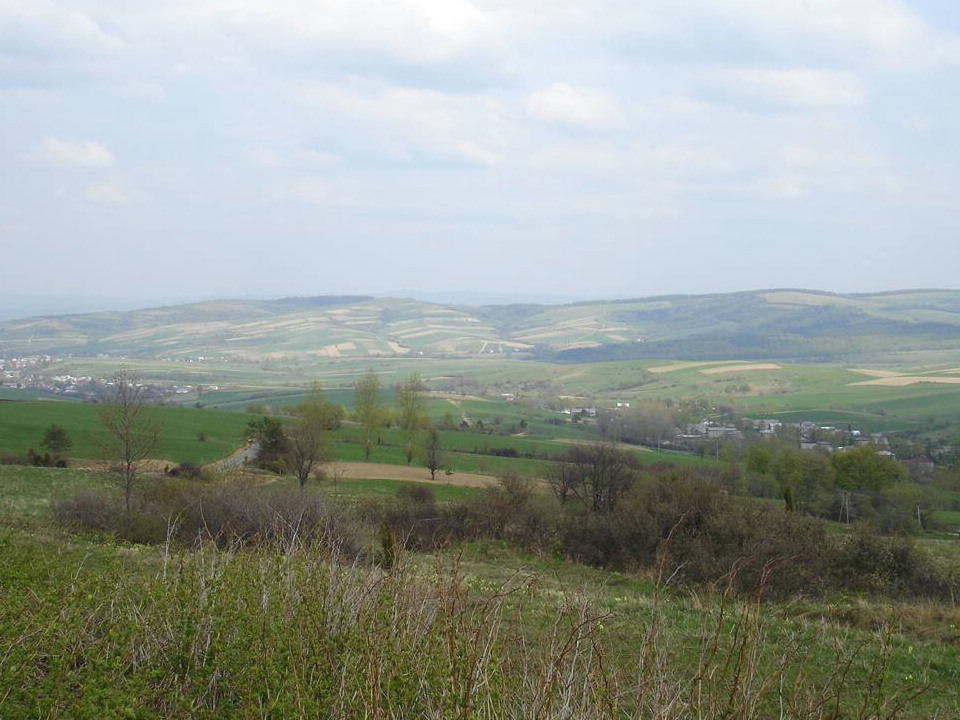
The Pogórze Bukowskie is a hilly region (thus the name, Bukowsko hilly region) in Poland.

Karlików was founded in 1483 by the Bals de Lobetanz family. From 966 to 1018, 1340–1772 (Ruthenian Voivodeship, Sanoker County) and from 1918 to 1939 Zboiska was part of Poland. From 1772 to 1918 it belonged to the Austrian empire. This part of Poland was controlled by Austria for almost 120 years. At that time the area (including west and east of Subcarpathian Voivodship) was known as Galicia. In 1785 the village lands comprised 61 łan.

Karlików is still a rural village inhabited mostly by ethnic Poles. It contains a ski slope which attracts seasonal tourism. The cemetery in Karlików still contains headstones of the Lemko families who once lived there.

== See also ==
- Komańcza Republic (November 1918 – January 1919)
