= Ratnawica, Sanok County =

Ratnawica
- Village
- Location within Poland
- Coordinates: 49°29′49″N 22°7′48″E
- Country: Poland
- Voivodeship: Subcarpathian
- County: Sanok
- Gmina: Bukowsko
- Population: 0
- Time zone: UTC+1 (CET)
  - Summer (DST): UTC+2 (CEST)

Ratnawica [ratnaˈvʲit͡sa] is a former village in the administrative district of Gmina Bukowsko, within Sanok County, Subcarpathian Voivodeship, in south-eastern Poland.
