= Kamienne =

Abandoned village in southeastern Poland

- Village
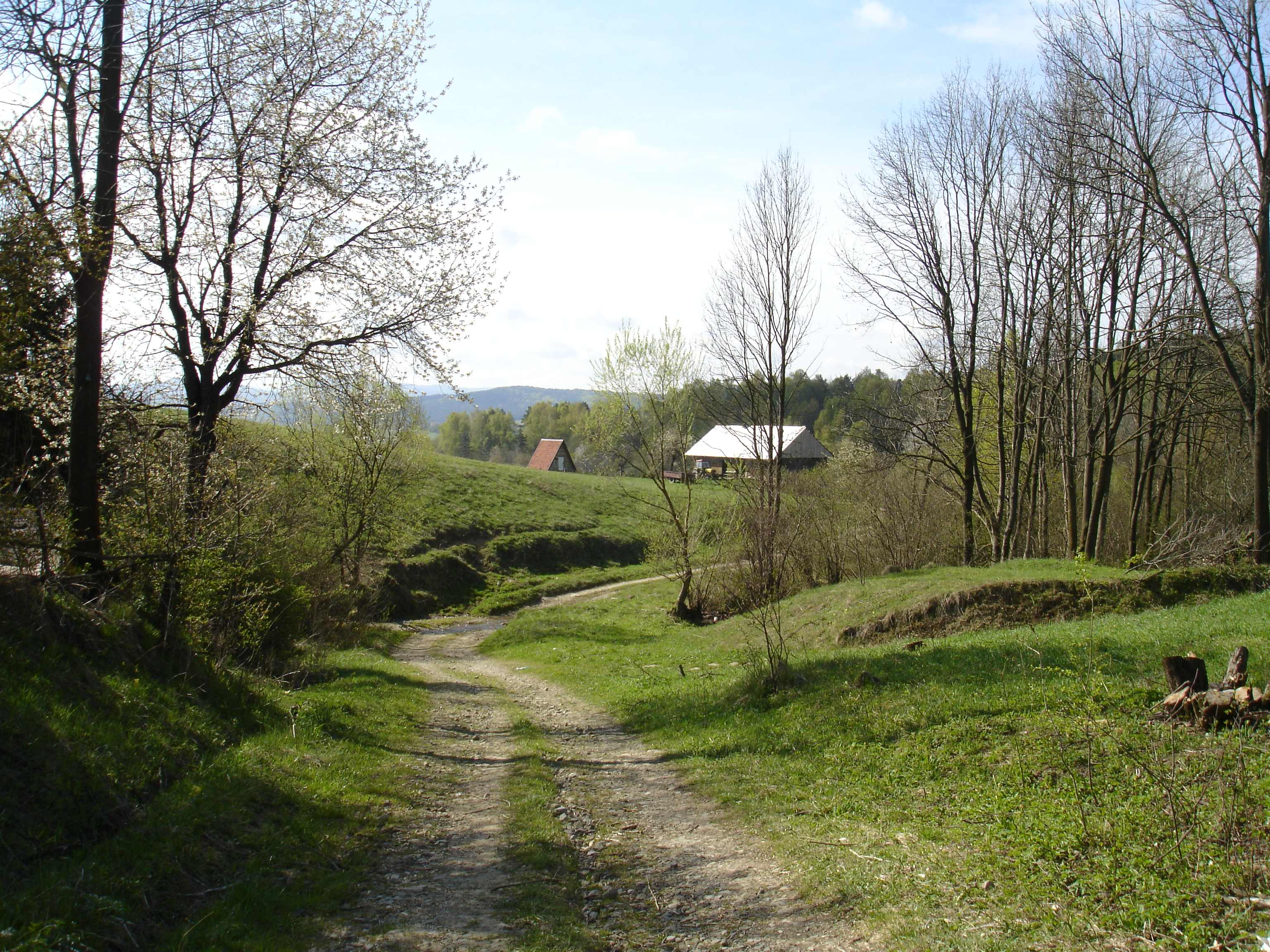

- Location within Poland
- Coordinates: 49°27′31″N 22°06′07″E
- Country: Poland
- Voivodeship: Subcarpathian
- Powiat: Sanok
- Gmina: Bukowsko
- Founded: 1550

Area
  - Total: 4.8 km^{2} (1.9 sq mi)
- Elevation: 270 m (890 ft)

Population
  - Total: 0
- Time zone: UTC+1 (CET)
  - Summer (DST): UTC+2 (CEST)
- Postal code: 38-507
- Vehicle registration: GTC

Kamienne [kaˈmʲɛnːɛ] is an abandoned village in the Lesser Beskid mountains in the administrative district of Gmina Bukowsko, within Sanok County, Subcarpathian Voivodeship, in south-eastern Poland. It is situated below the main watershed at the foot of the Słonne Mountain, and has an elevation of 340 metres, about 16 km (10 mi) east of Sanok. It is located about halfway between Bukowsko and Płonna.

== History ==
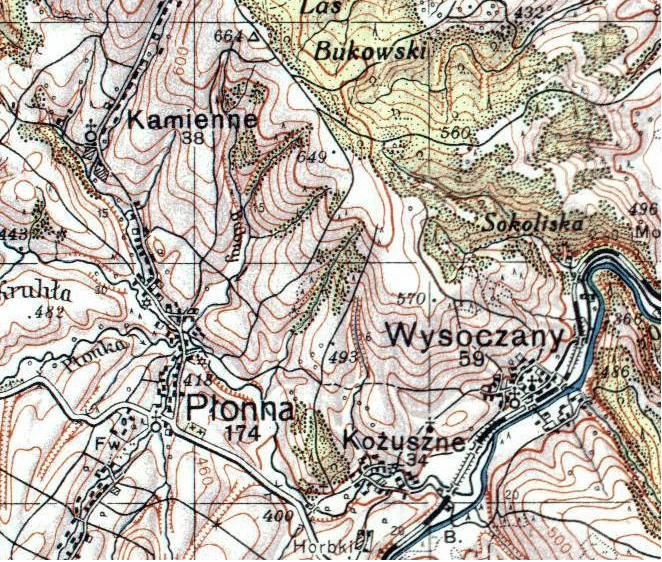
A 1933 map showing the location of Kamienne

Kamienne was founded in 1550 by Polish nobleman Mikołaj Herburt Odnowski, when it formed part of the Kingdom of Poland. Following the First Partition of Poland, in 1772, it was annexed by Austria. By the second half of the 19th century, the village had been bought by Leopoldyna Horodyńska.

Following World War I, Poland regained independence and control of the village. Following the joint German-Soviet invasion of Poland, which started World War II in September 1939, the village was occupied by Germany. The village was burned down in the spring 1946 by the Polish Army after its Ukrainian population had been forced to relocate to Soviet Ukraine by Polish Army. From 1975 to 1998, it was administratively located in the Krosno Voivodship. The small shrine in Kamienne is very hard to get to. One has to hike through underbrush up a hill to get to it on top of needing an off-road vehicle to get to what is left of the village. The few standing buildings are just used now for hunting cabins. The small cemetery in Kamienne has no headstones but the graves are quite noticeable.

Historical population
Year	Pop.	±%
1880	162	—
1936	200	+23.5%
2001	3	−98.5%
