= Tokarnia, Sanok County =

Tokarnia Токарня
- Village
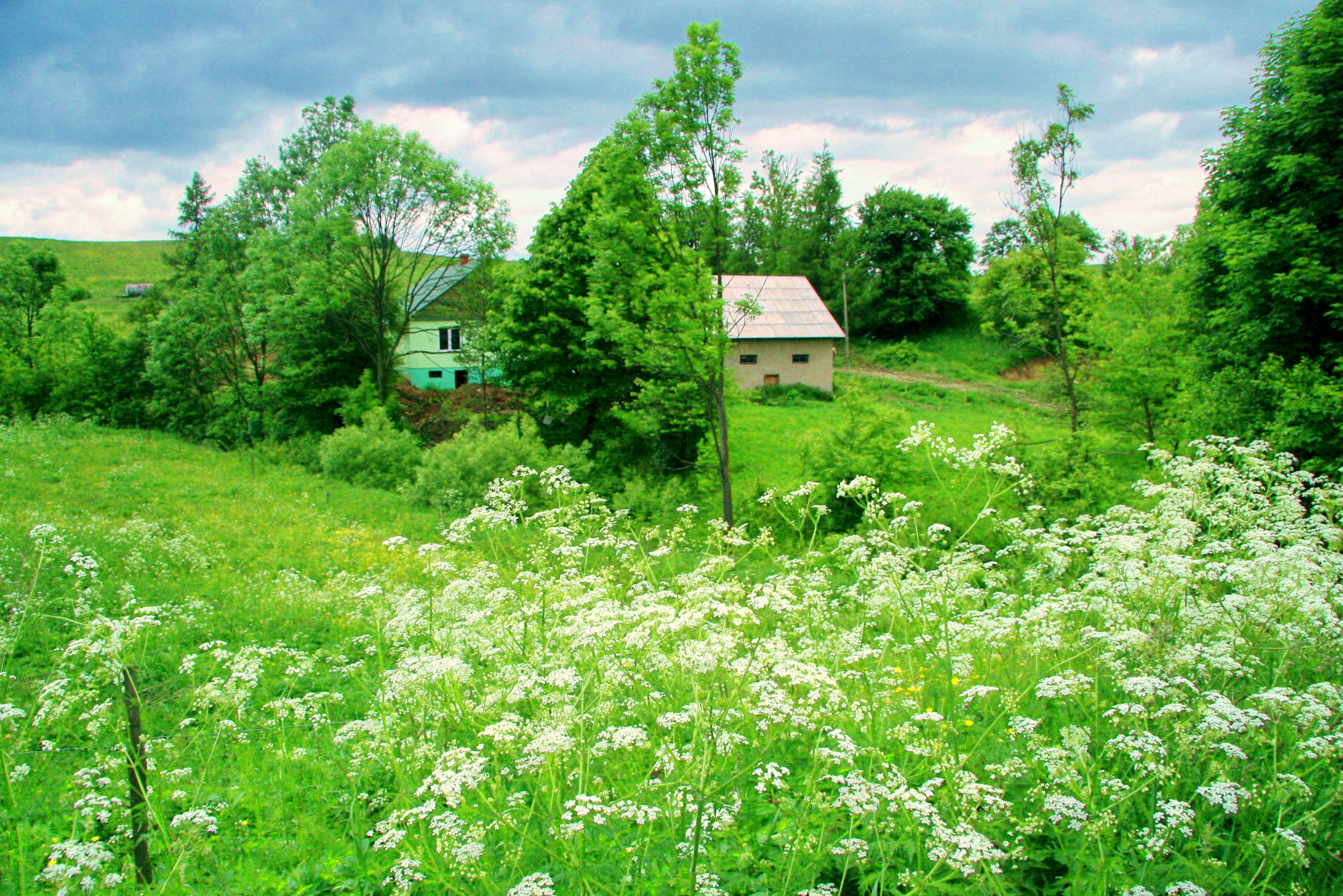
- View of houses in Tokarnia Village

- Location within Poland
- Coordinates: 49°27′58″N 22°01′25″E
- Country: Poland
- Voivodeship: Subcarpathian
- County: Sanok
- Gmina: Bukowsko
- Founded: 1526

Area
  - Total: 4.8 km^{2} (1.9 sq mi)
- Elevation: 270 m (890 ft)

Population
  - Total: 200
- Time zone: UTC+1 (CET)
  - Summer (DST): UTC+2 (CEST)
- Postal code: 38-500

Tokarnia [tɔˈkarɲa] is a village in East Małopolska in the Lesser Beskid mountains, Bukowsko rural commune. Tokarnia is about 10 miles (16 kilometres) from Sanok in south-eastern Poland. It is situated below the main watershed at the foot of the Słonne Mountain, and has an elevation of 270 metres (890 ft). It is in the Subcarpathian Voivodship (since 1999), previously in Krosno Voivodship (1975–1998) and Sanok district.

== History ==
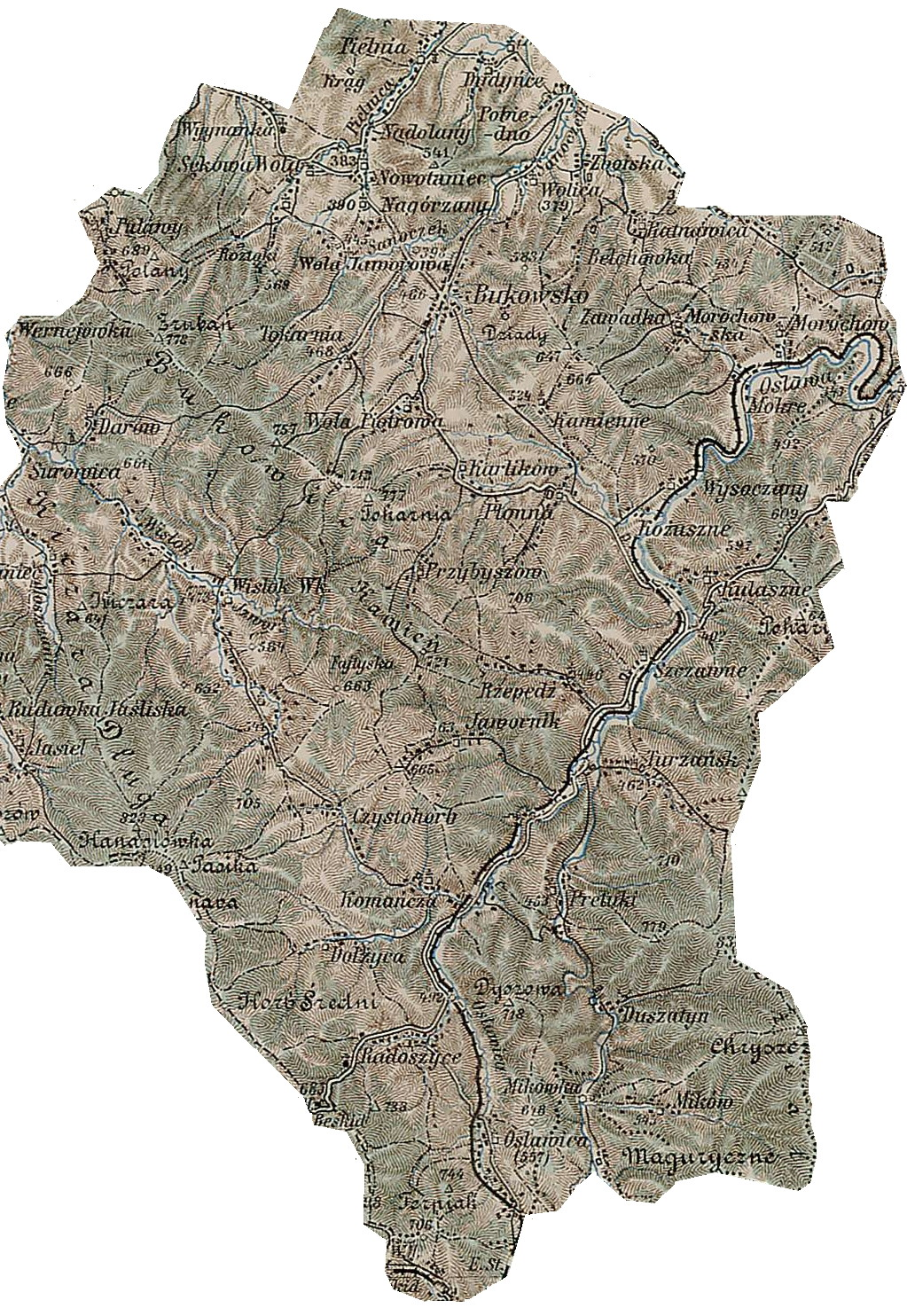
An 1898 map shows the location of Tokarnia

Tokarnia was founded in 1526 by Herburt. From 1340 to 1772 (Ruthenian Voivodeship) and from 1918 to 1939 Tokarnia was part of Poland. While during 1772-1918 it belonged to Austrian empire, later Austrian-Hungarian empire when double monarchy was introduced in Austria. This part of Poland was controlled by Austria for almost 120 years. At that time the area (including west and east of Subcarpathian Voivodship) was known as Galicia.

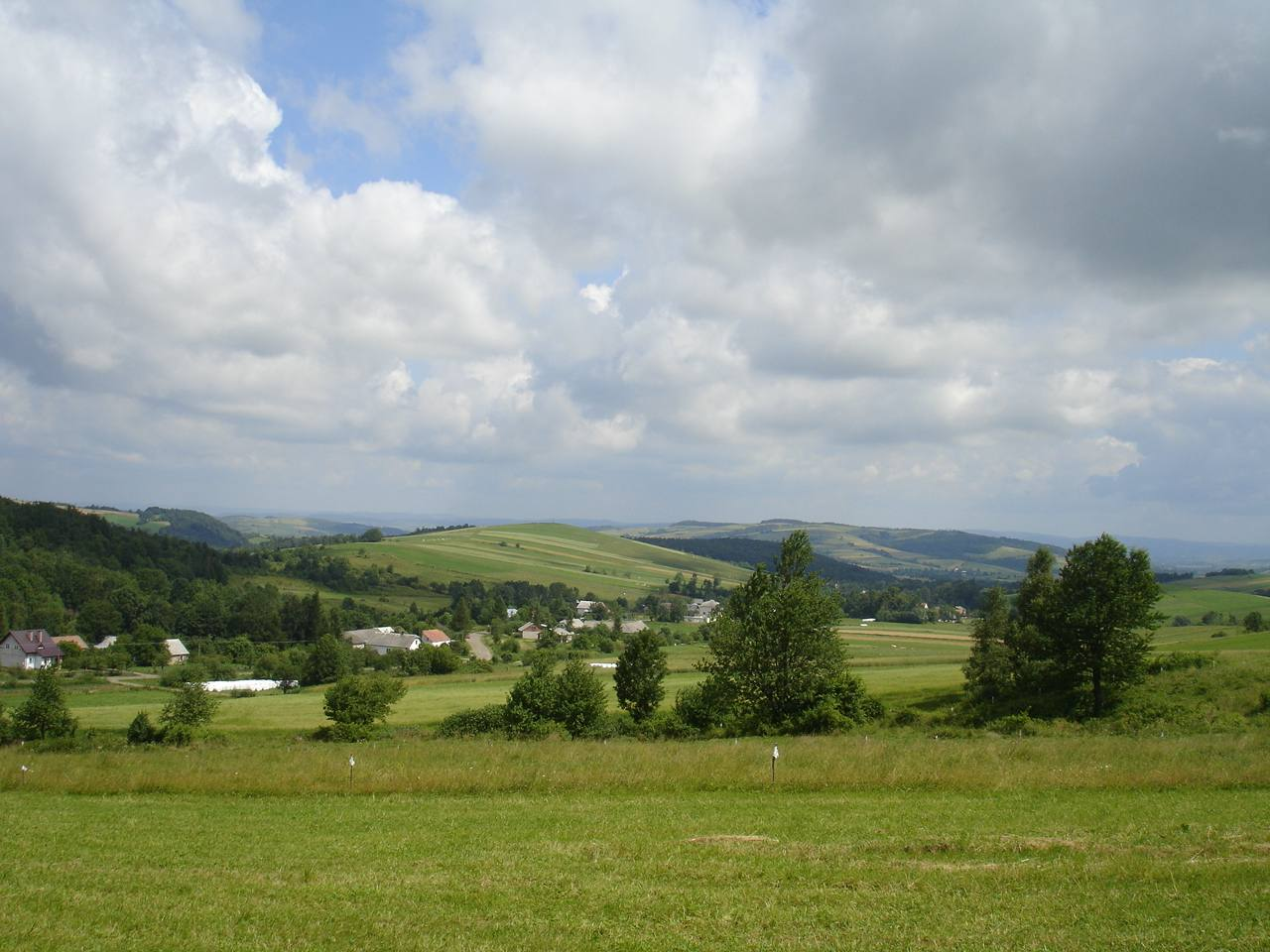
A view of the village of Tokarnia

=== Religion ===
In Tokarnia there used to be a Greek Catholic parish church, the church of St. Michael the Archangel (formerly called the church of The Most Blessed Virgin Mary). The wooden church was built and blessed in 1785. In this year the parish had a congregation of 280 Greek Catholics, which went up to 612 by 1936. The church was destroyed in 1946 by the UPA.

The Roman Catholic parish for Tokarnia was located in Bukowsko. It's diocesan was located in Przemyśl. The Roman Catholic Archdiocesan Archives in Przemyśl has some records for Tokarnia, however they are of a different time period.

== Literature ==
- Adam Fastnacht, Nagórzany [in:] Slownik Historyczno-Geograficzny Ziemi Sanockiej w Średniowieczu (Historic-Geographic Dictionary of the Sanok District in the Middle Ages), Kraków, (II edition 2002), ISBN 83-88385-14-3.
- Jerzy Zuba "W Gminie Bukowsko". Roksana, 2004, ISBN 83-7343-150-0. Translated by Deborah Greenlee. Arlington, TX 76016.

== International Relations ==
=== Twin towns ===
Tokarnia is twinned with:

- Drocourt in France
