= Bełchówka =

- Village
- Location within Poland
- Coordinates: 49°29′06″N 22°06′37″E
- Country: Poland
- Voivodeship: Subcarpathian
- County: Sanok
- Gmina: Bukowsko
- Population: 0
- Time zone: UTC+1 (CET)
  - Summer (DST): UTC+2 (CEST)

Bełchówka [bɛu̯ˈxufka] is a former village in the administrative district of Gmina Bukowsko, within Sanok County, Subcarpathian Voivodeship, in south-eastern Poland.
