= Gmina Bukowsko =

Gmina Bukowsko Bukowsko Commune
- Gmina
- Flag Coat of arms

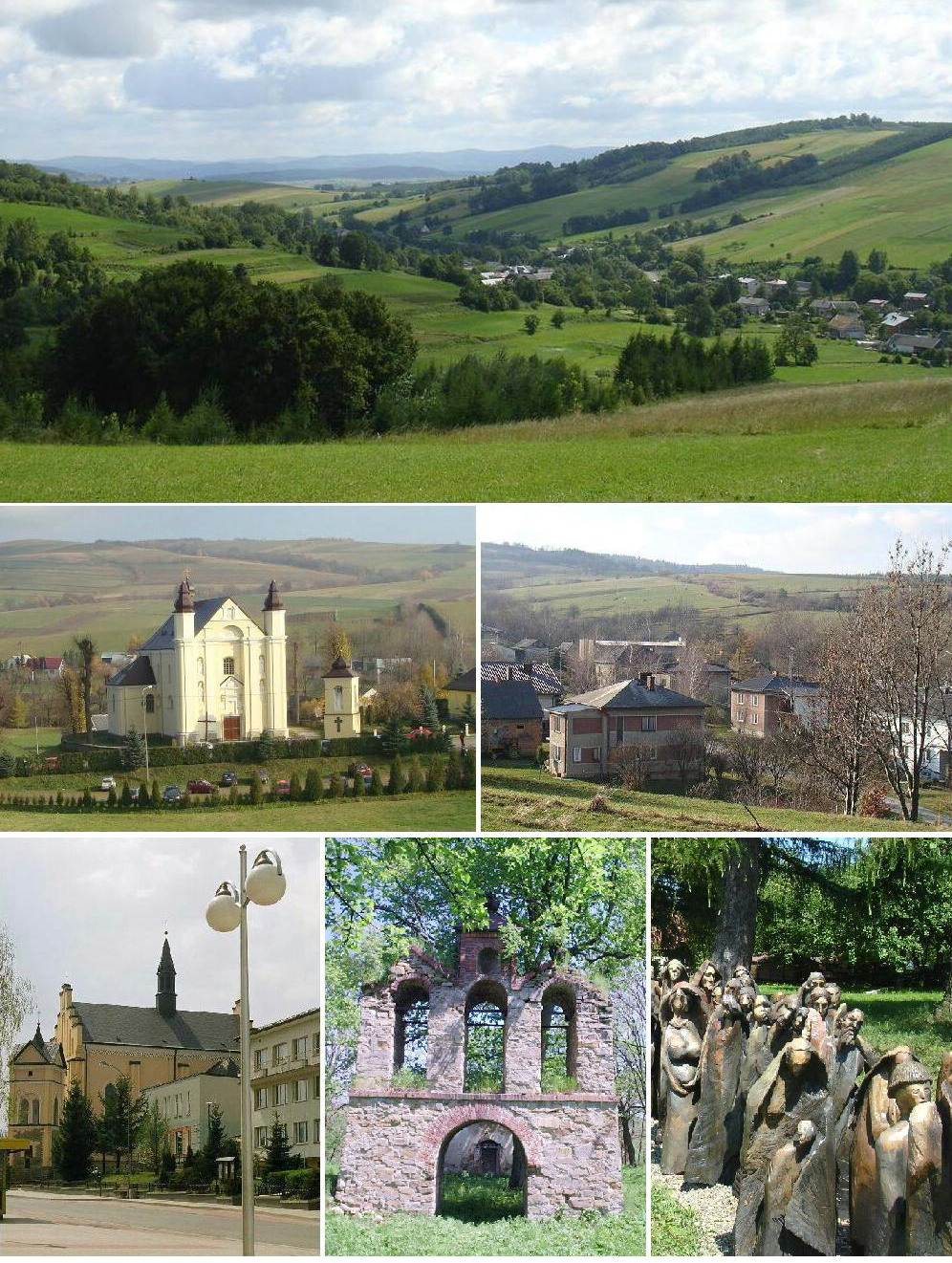

- Location within Poland Location within Subcarpathian Voivodeship
- Coordinates (Bukowsko): 49°29′N 22°4′E
- Country: Poland
- Voivodeship: Subcarpathian
- County: Sanok
- Seat: Bukowsko

Area
  - Total: 136.9 km^{2} (52.9 sq mi)

Population (2006)
  - Total: 5,210
  - Density: 38.1/km^{2} (98.6/sq mi)
- Website: http://www.bukowsko.pl/

Gmina Bukowsko is a rural gmina (administrative district) in Sanok County, Subcarpathian Voivodeship, in south-eastern Poland. Its seat is the village of Bukowsko, which lies approximately 14 kilometres (9 mi) south-west of Sanok and 62 km (39 mi) south of the regional capital Rzeszów.

The gmina covers an area of 138.2 square kilometres (53.4 sq mi), and as of 2006 its total population is 5,210.

== Sołectwos ==
Sołectwo	Sołtys
Bukowsko	Kazimierz Zadylak
Wolica	Tadeusz Gliściak
Wola Piotrowa	Jan Hołomek
Karlików	Ryszard Pleśniarski
Zboiska	Roman Adamski
Dudyńce	Maksymilian Świderski
Nagórzany	Jan Orybkiewicz
Nadolany	Zbigniew Pieszczoch
Nowotaniec	Henryk Majka
Tokarnia	Stanisław Krzywiński
Wola Sękowa	Michał Dąbrowiak
Pobiedno	Augustyn Starego
Płonna

Ethnic Groups

- Poles

== Hiking trails ==
- European walking route E8
  - Iwonicz-Zdrój – Rymanów-Zdrój - Puławy – Tokarnia (778 m) – Przybyszów – Kamień (717 m) – Komańcza - Prełuki – Duszatyn – Jeziorka Duszatyńskie – Chryszczata (997 m) – Wołosań (1071 m) – Cisna - Połonina Caryńska – Szeroki Wierch – Rozsypaniec (1282 m)– Halicz – Przełęcz Bukowska - Tarnica – Ustrzyki Górne – Wołosate.

== Historical rural commune ==
Gerichts-Bezirk of Austria-Hungary until 1918:

Village	First mentioned
Bełchówka	1451
Czaszyn	1450
Czystogarb	1524
Darów	1553
Dołżyca	1549
Dudyńce	1372
Duszatyn	1578
Jasiel	1534
Jawornik	1546
Jędruszkowce	1438
Kamienne	1553
Karlików	1483
Komańcza	1512
Kulaszne	1538
Łupków	1526
Maniów	1554
Markowce	1367
Mików	1561
Mokre	1467
Morochów	1402
Moszczaniec	1447
Nadolany	1589
Nagórzany	1589
Niebieszczany	1373
Nowotaniec	1361
Odrzechowa	1543
Osławica	1530
Pielnia	1400
Płonna	1433
Pobiedno	1361
Podgaj	1550
Polany Surowiczne	1549
Prełuki	1557
Prusiek	1361
Przybyszów	1553
Puławy	1553
Radoszyce	1361
Ratnawica	1441
Rzepedź	1565
Smolnik	1511
Surowica	1361
Szczawne	1437
Tokarnia	1526
Turzańsk	1514
Wisłok Dolny,	(1361) Wisłok
Wisłok Górny,	(1361) Wisłok
Wola Michowa	1546
Wola Piotrowa	1526
Wola Sękowa	1493
Wolica	1361
Wysoczany	1635
Zawadka	1567
Zboiska	1361

== Neighbouring gminas ==
Gmina Bukowsko is bordered by the gminas of Komańcza, Rymanów, Sanok, Zagórz and Zarszyn.

== Literature ==
- Prof. Adam Fastnacht. Slownik Historyczno-Geograficzny Ziemi Sanockiej w Średniowieczu (Historic-Geographic Dictionary of the Sanok District in the Middle Ages), Kraków, 2002, ISBN 83-88385-14-3.
- Jerzy Zuba "W Gminie Bukowsko". Roksana, 2004, ISBN 83-7343-150-0. Translated by Deborah Greenlee. Arlington, TX 76016.
