= Topoľovka =

- Municipality
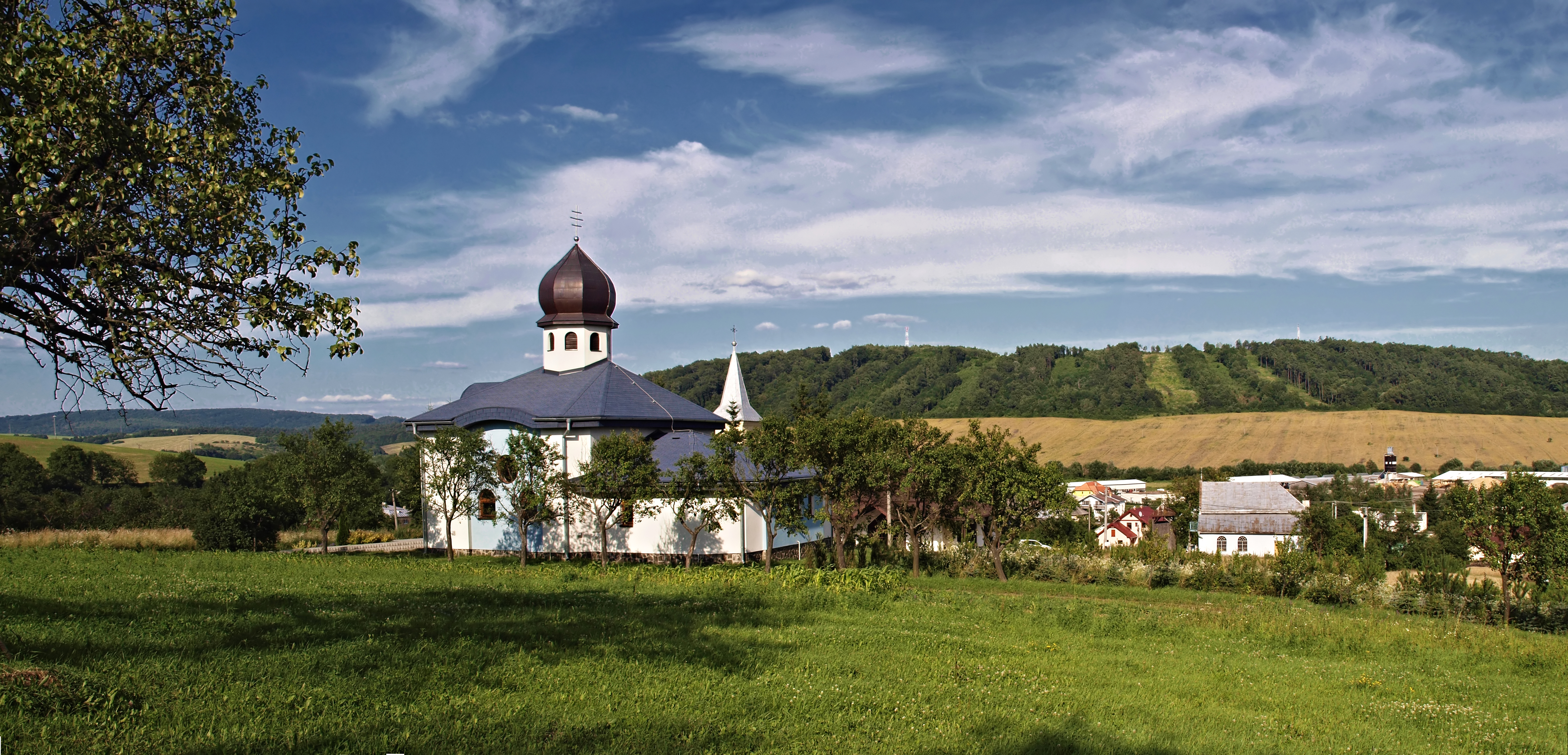

- Flag

- Location of Topoľovka in the Prešov Region Location of Topoľovka in Slovakia
- Coordinates: 48.92°N 21.81°E
- Country: Slovakia
- Region: Prešov Region
- District: Humenné District
- First mentioned: 1479

Area
  - Total: 7.77 km^{2} (3.00 sq mi)
- Elevation: 138 m (453 ft)

Population (2025)
  - Total: 808
- Time zone: UTC+1 (CET)
  - Summer (DST): UTC+2 (CEST)
- Postal code: 674 5
- Area code: +421 57
- Vehicle registration plate (until 2022): HE
- Website: topolovka.estranky.sk

Topoľovka is a village and municipality in Humenné District in the Prešov Region of north-east Slovakia.

== History ==
In historical records the village was first mentioned in 1479.

== Geography ==
The municipality lies at an altitude of 138 metres (453 ft) and covers an area of 7.77 km^{2} (3.00 sq mi) (2025).

== Population ==
Population statistic (10 years)
Year	1995	2005	2015	2025
Count	810	824	816	808
Difference		+1.72%	−0.97%	−0.98%

Population statistic
Year	2024	2025
Count	807	808
Difference		+0.12%

It has a population of 808 people (31 December 2025).

=== Ethnicity ===
Census 2021 (1+ %)
Ethnicity	Number	Fraction
Slovak	766	96.35%
Rusyn	30	3.77%
Not found out	16	2.01%
Czech	9	1.13%
Total	795	

In year 2021 was 795 people by ethnicity 766 as Slovak, 30 as Rusyn, 16 as Not found out, 9 as Czech, 4 as Other, 3 as Romani, 3 as Polish, 1 as Ukrainian and 1 as Moravian.

Note on population: The difference values of population numbers in the table "Population statistic" and in the sections "Ethnicity" & "Religion" is caused by the use of various statistical methods.

=== Religion ===
Census 2021 (1+ %)
Religion	Number	Fraction
Roman Catholic Church	533	67.04%
Greek Catholic Church	152	19.12%
None	62	7.8%
Not found out	19	2.39%
Eastern Orthodox Church	18	2.26%
Total	795	

In year 2021 was 795 people by religion 533 from Roman Catholic Church, 152 from Greek Catholic Church, 62 from None, 19 from Not found out, 18 from Eastern Orthodox Church, 4 from Ad hoc movements, 3 from Evangelical Church, 2 from Other, 1 from Other and not ascertained christian church and 1 from Jehovah's Witnesses.

== International relations ==
=== Twin towns — Sister cities ===
Topoľovka is twinned with:

- Bukowsko, Poland
