= Palota =

- Municipality
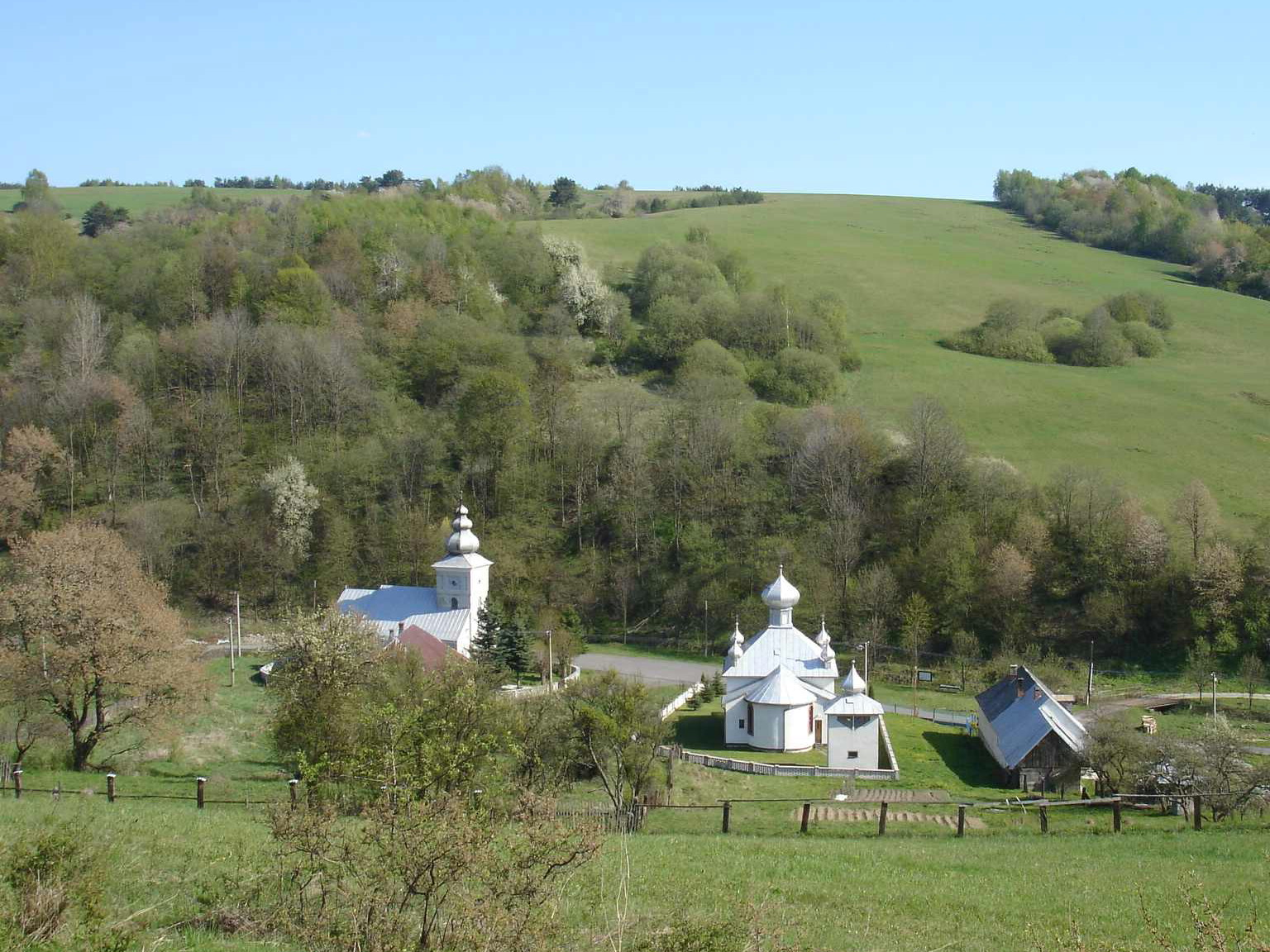

- Flag

- Location of Palota in the Prešov Region Location of Palota in Slovakia
- Coordinates: 49.27°N 22.00°E
- Country: Slovakia
- Region: Prešov Region
- District: Medzilaborce District
- First mentioned: 1330

Area
  - Total: 24.12 km^{2} (9.31 sq mi)
- Elevation: 439 m (1,440 ft)

Population (2025)
  - Total: 174
- Time zone: UTC+1 (CET)
  - Summer (DST): UTC+2 (CEST)
- Postal code: 675 1
- Area code: +421 57
- Vehicle registration plate (until 2022): ML
- Website: www.palota.sk

Palota (Rusyn: Палота, Hungarian: Palota) is a village and municipality in the Medzilaborce District in the Prešov Region of far north-eastern Slovakia.

== History ==
In historical records the village was first mentioned in 1330. Before the establishment of independent Czechoslovakia in 1918, it was part of Zemplén County within the Kingdom of Hungary.

== Geography ==
The municipality lies at an altitude of 439 metres (1,440 ft) and covers an area of 24.12 km^{2} (9.31 sq mi) (2025).

== Population ==
Population statistic (10 years)
Year	1995	2005	2015	2025
Count	180	183	186	174
Difference		+1.66%	+1.63%	−6.45%

Population statistic
Year	2024	2025
Count	179	174
Difference		−2.79%

It has a population of 174 people (31 December 2025).

=== Ethnicity ===
Census 2021 (1+ %)
Ethnicity	Number	Fraction
Slovak	146	75.64%
Rusyn	74	38.34%
Romani	17	8.8%
Not found out	6	3.1%
Ukrainian	2	1.03%
Total	193	

In year 2021 was 193 people by ethnicity 146 as Slovak, 74 as Rusyn, 17 as Romani, 6 as Not found out and 2 as Ukrainian.

Note on population: The difference values of population numbers in the table "Population statistic" and in the sections "Ethnicity" & "Religion" is caused by the use of various statistical methods.

=== Religion ===
Census 2021 (1+ %)
Religion	Number	Fraction
Eastern Orthodox Church	121	62.69%
Greek Catholic Church	43	22.28%
None	23	11.92%
Not found out	4	2.07%
Roman Catholic Church	2	1.04%
Total	193	

In year 2021 was 193 people by religion 121 from Eastern Orthodox Church, 43 from Greek Catholic Church, 23 from None, 4 from Not found out and 2 from Roman Catholic Church.

== Gallery ==
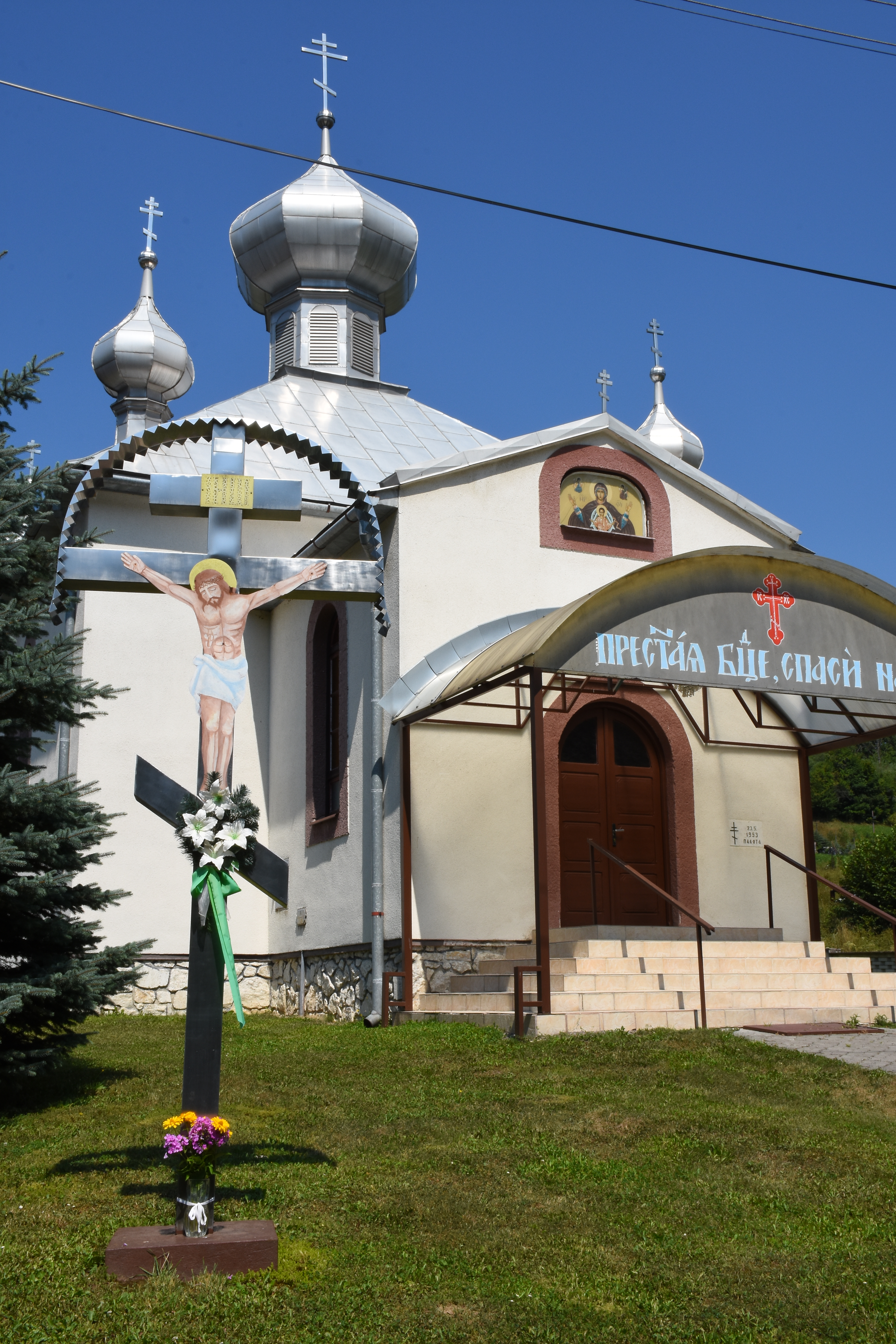
Orthodox Church of the Nativity of Our Lady in Palota

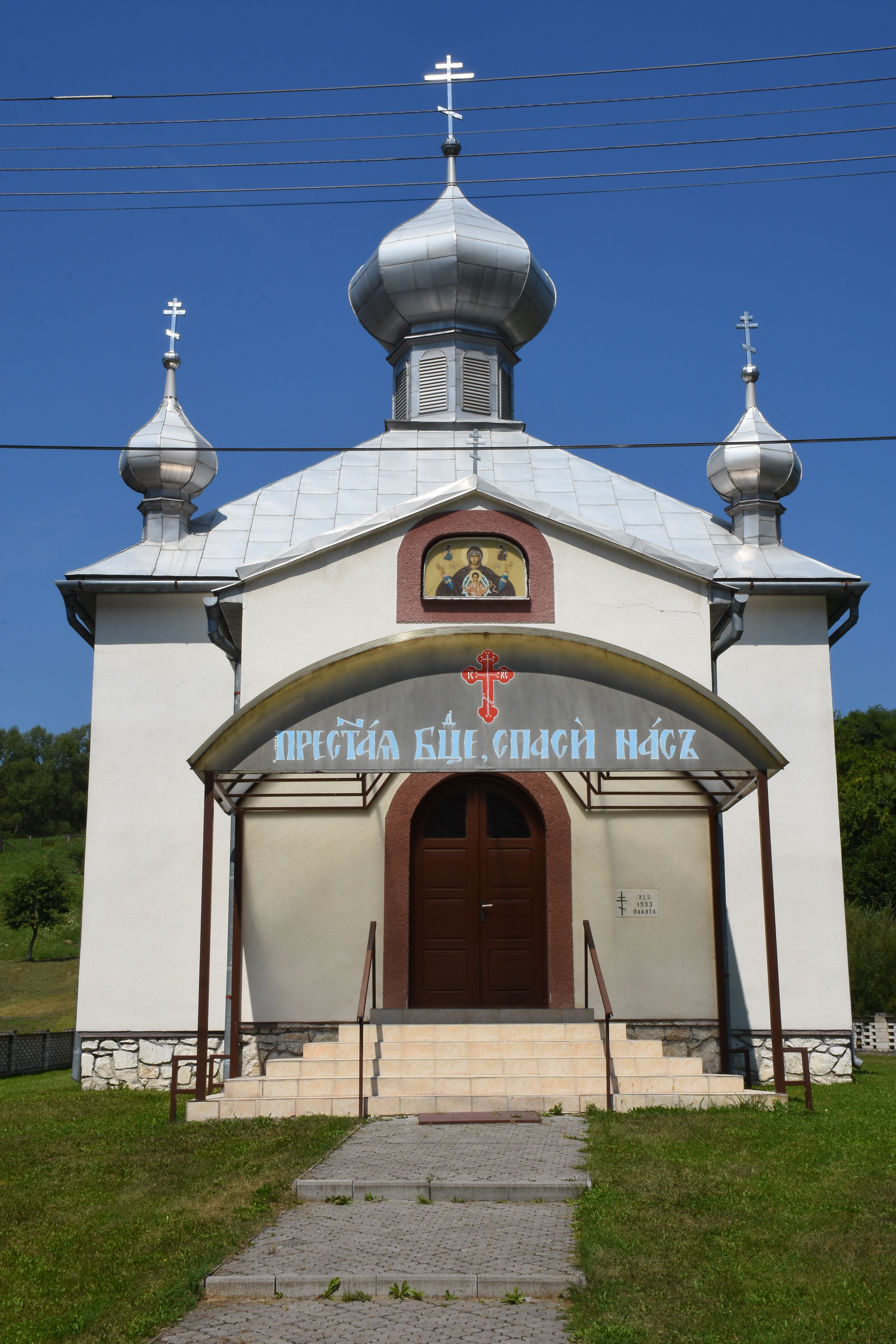
Front facade of the Orthodox Church of the Nativity of Our Lady in Palota

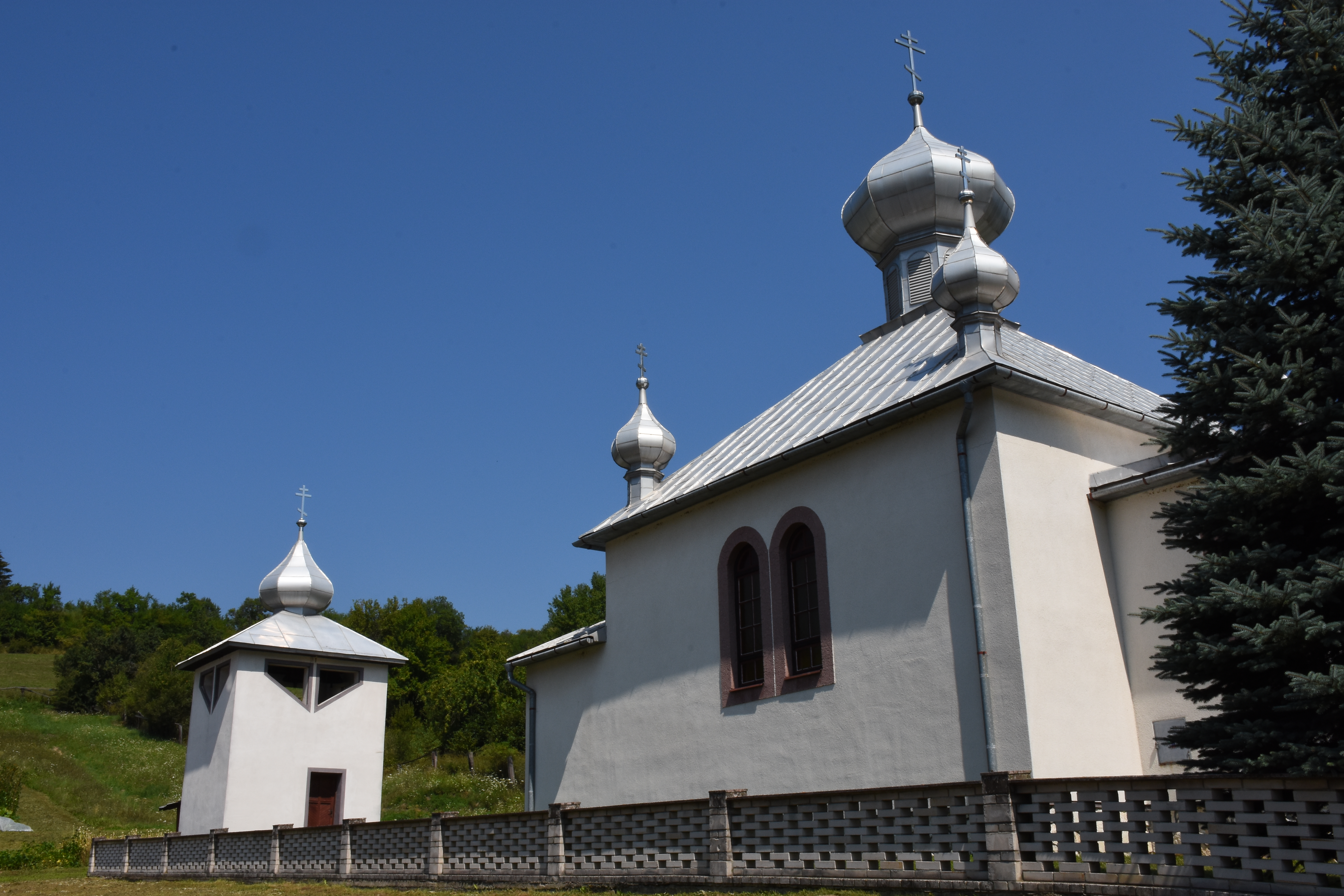
Orthodox Church of the Nativity of Our Lady and belfry in Palota

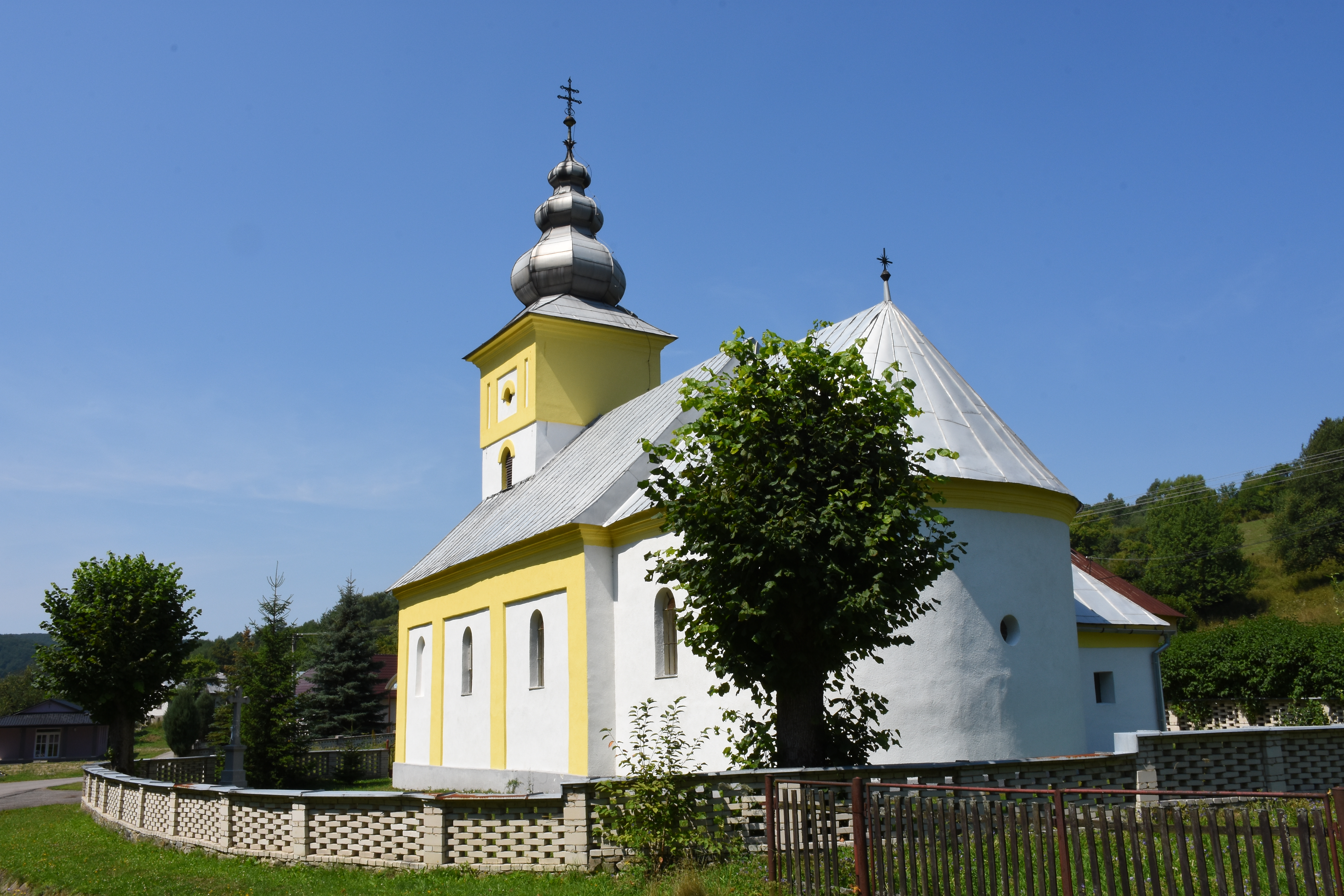
Greek Catholic Church in Palota

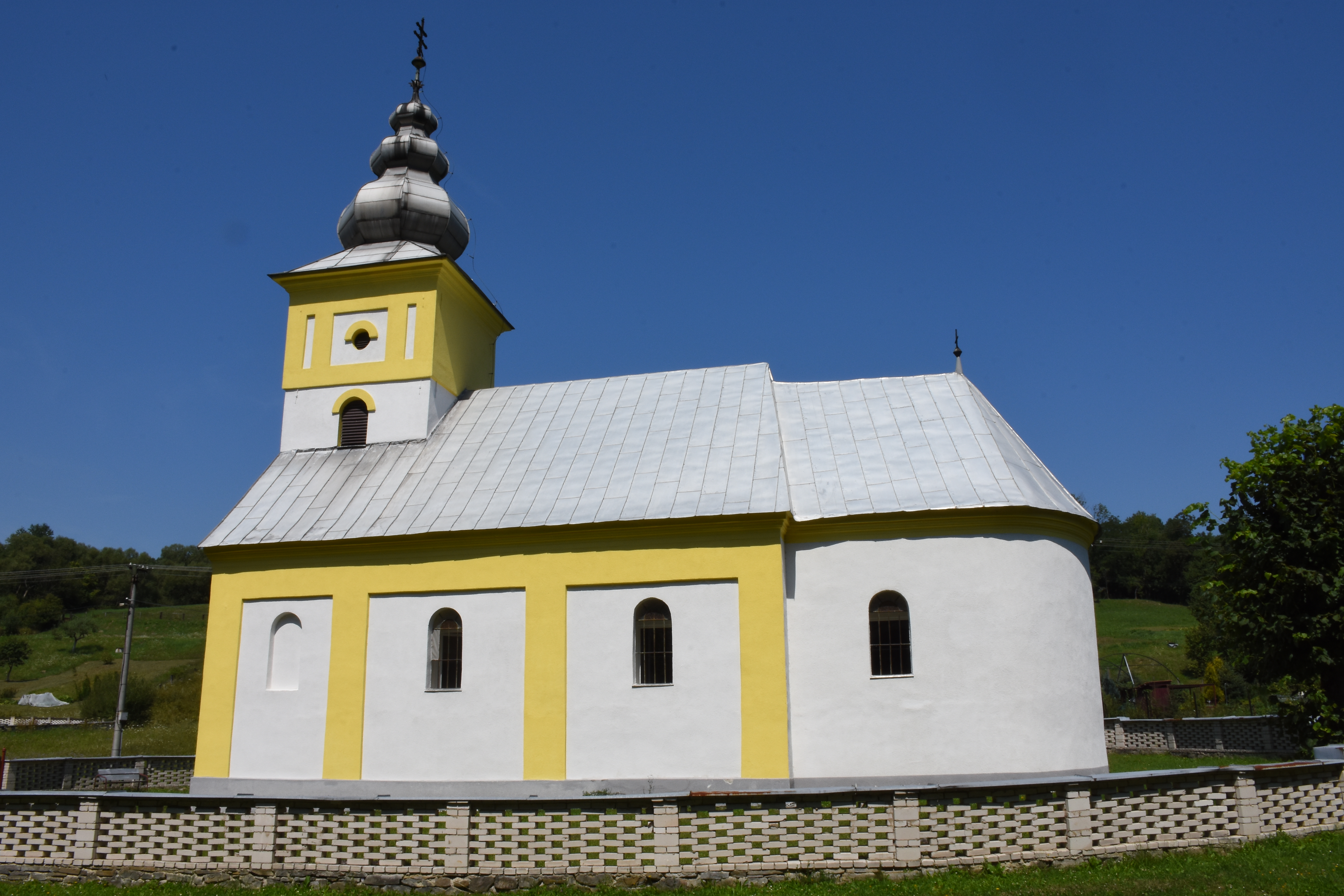
Greek Catholic Church in Palota

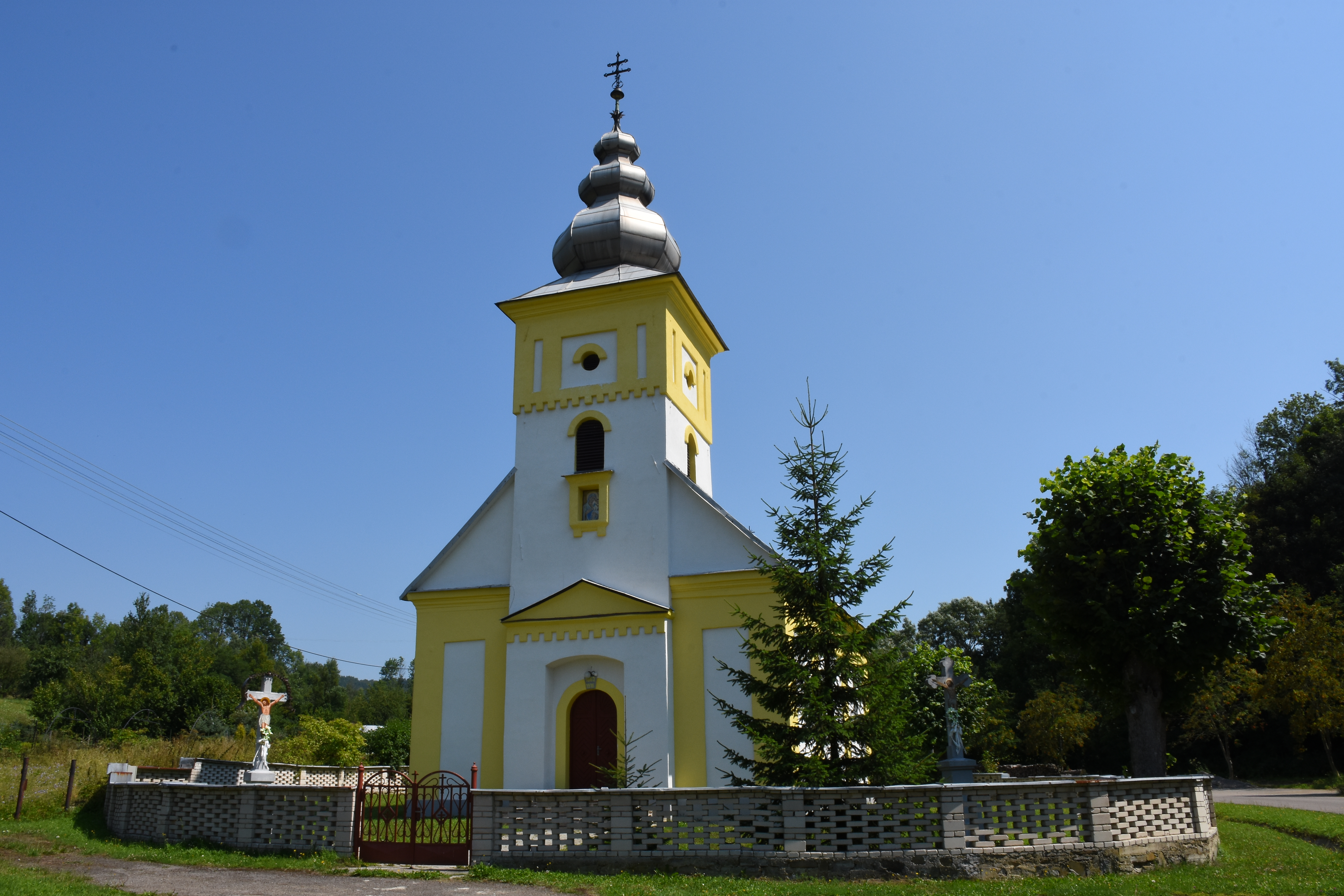
Front facade of Greek Catholic Church in Palota

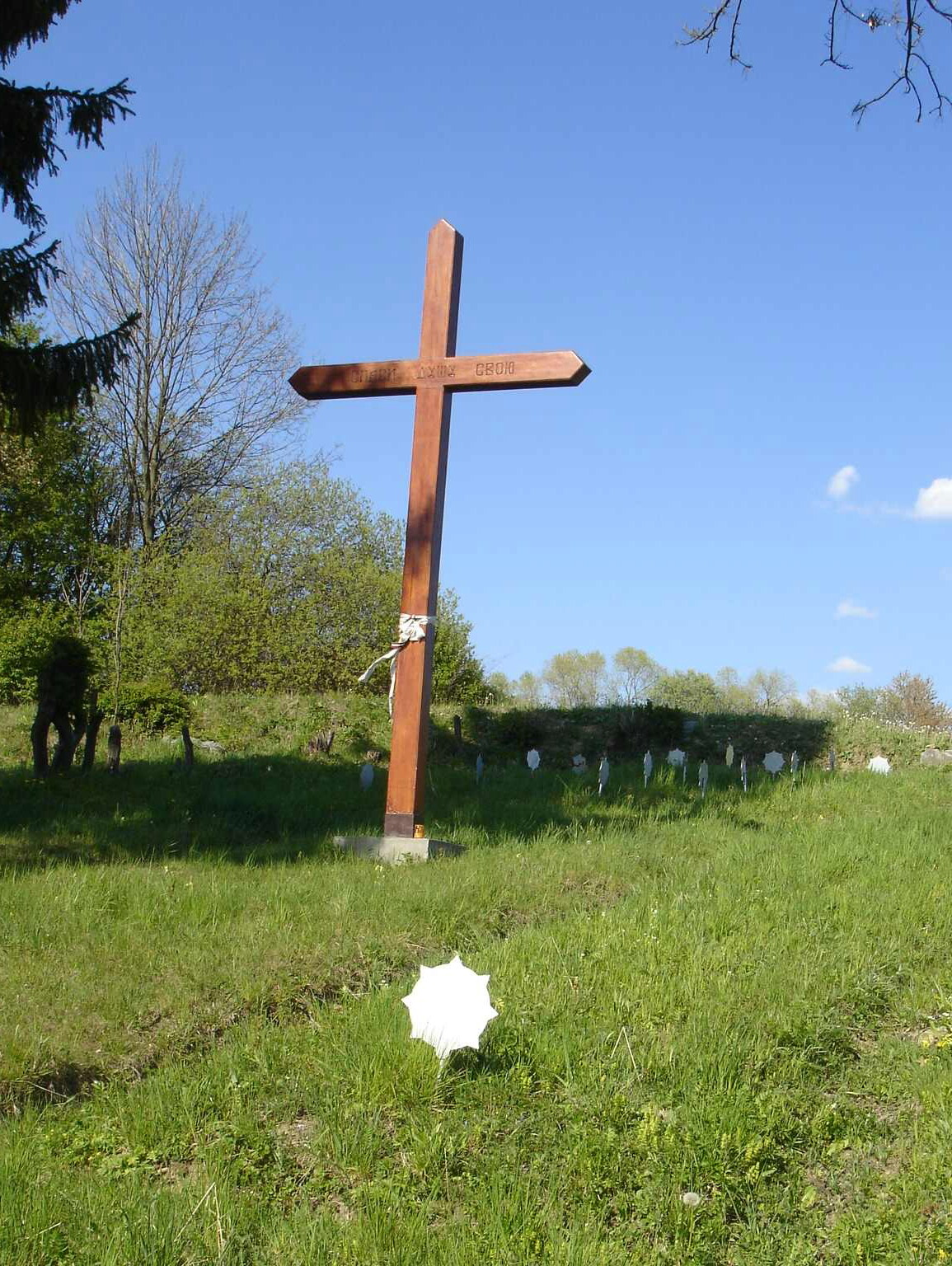
WWI military cemetery in Palota

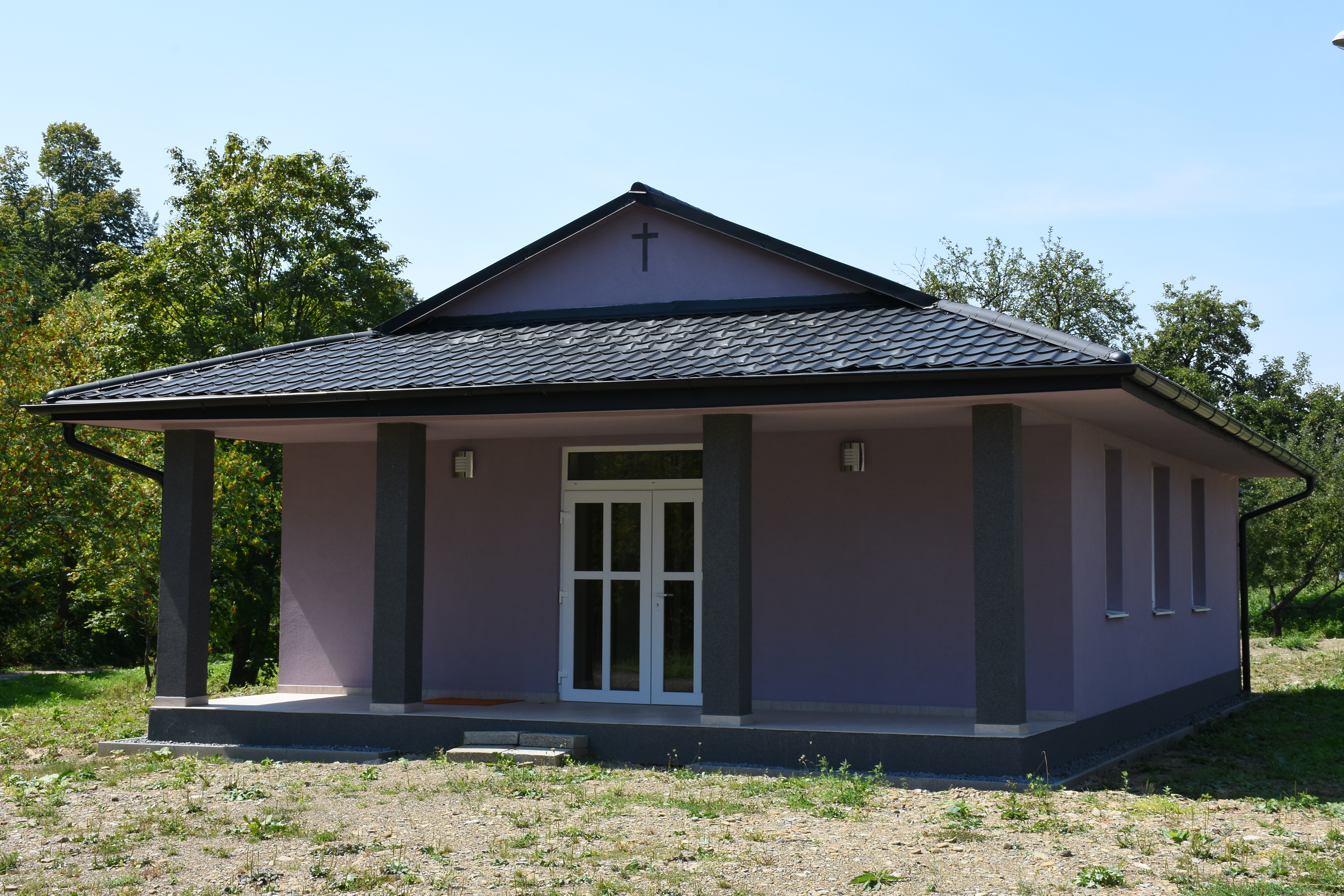
Funeral home in Palota

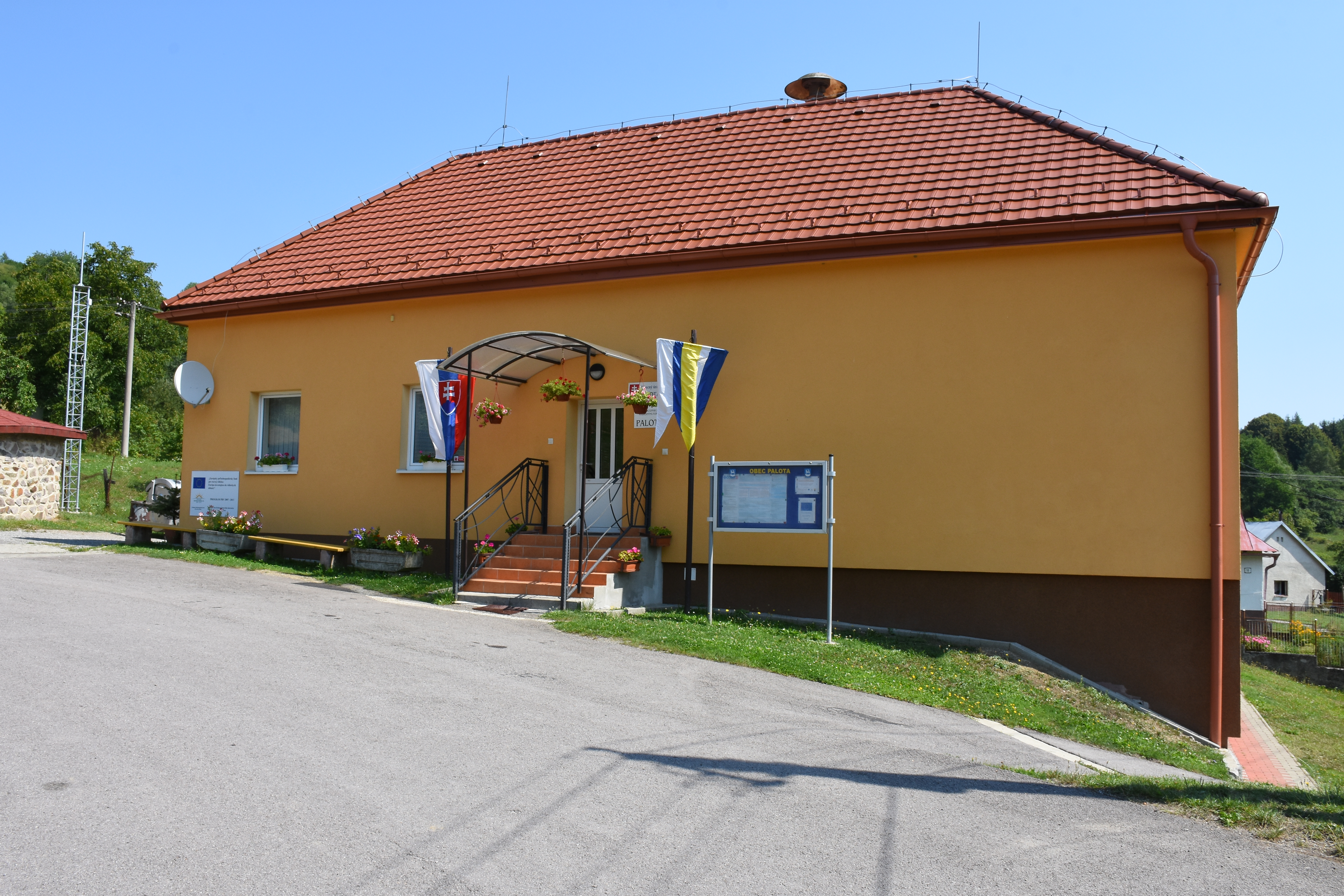
Municipal office in Palota

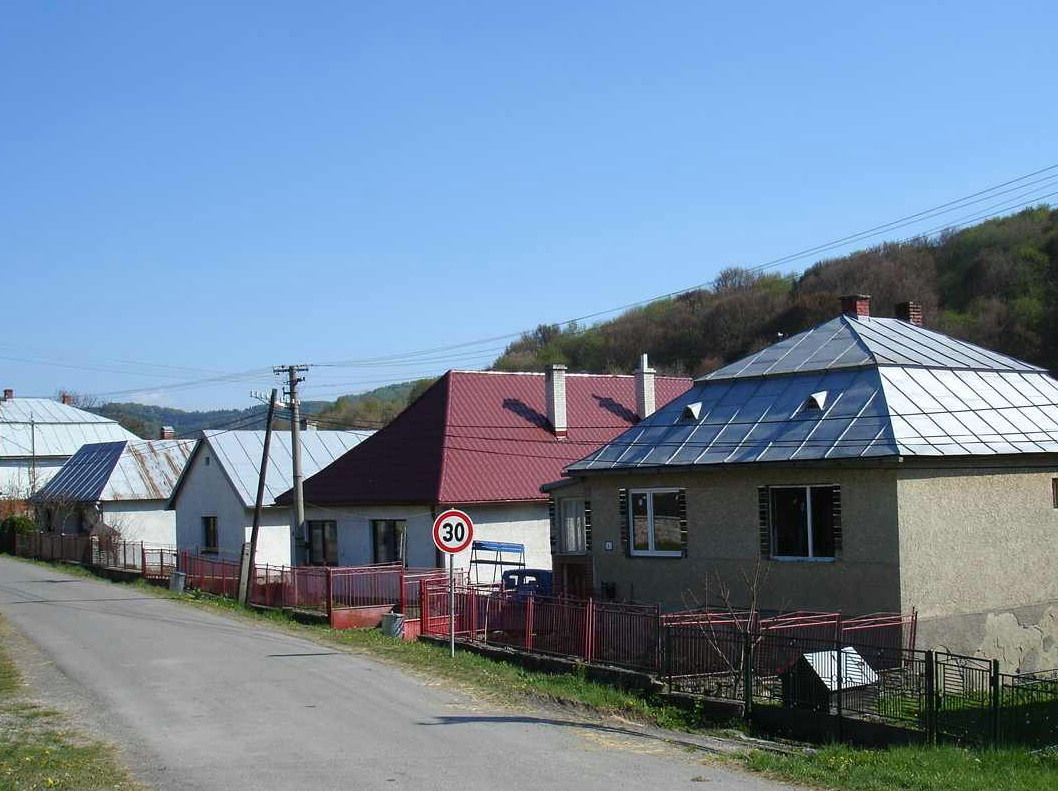
A street with newer housing in Palota

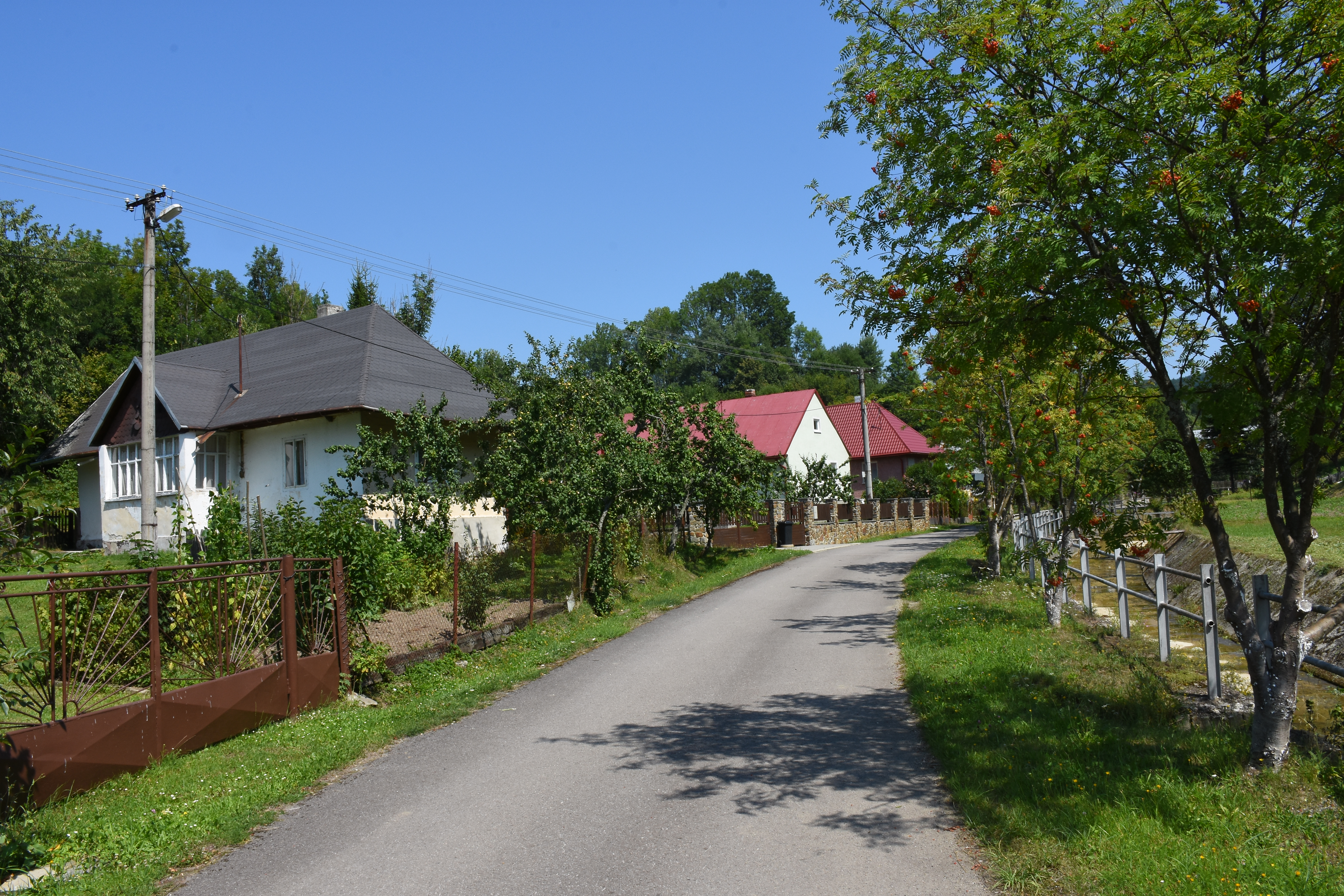
Street with local stream in Palota

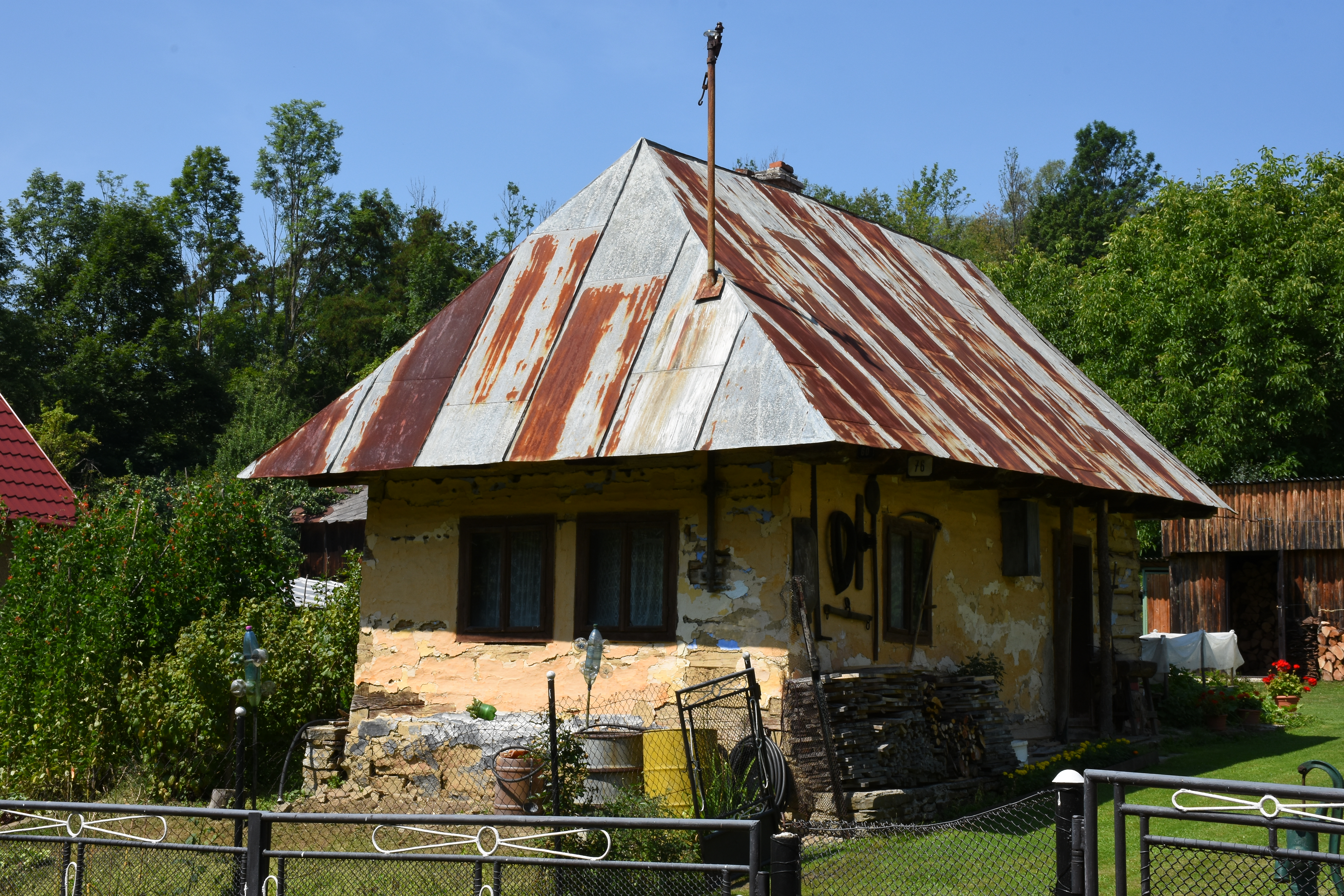
Old cottage in Palota

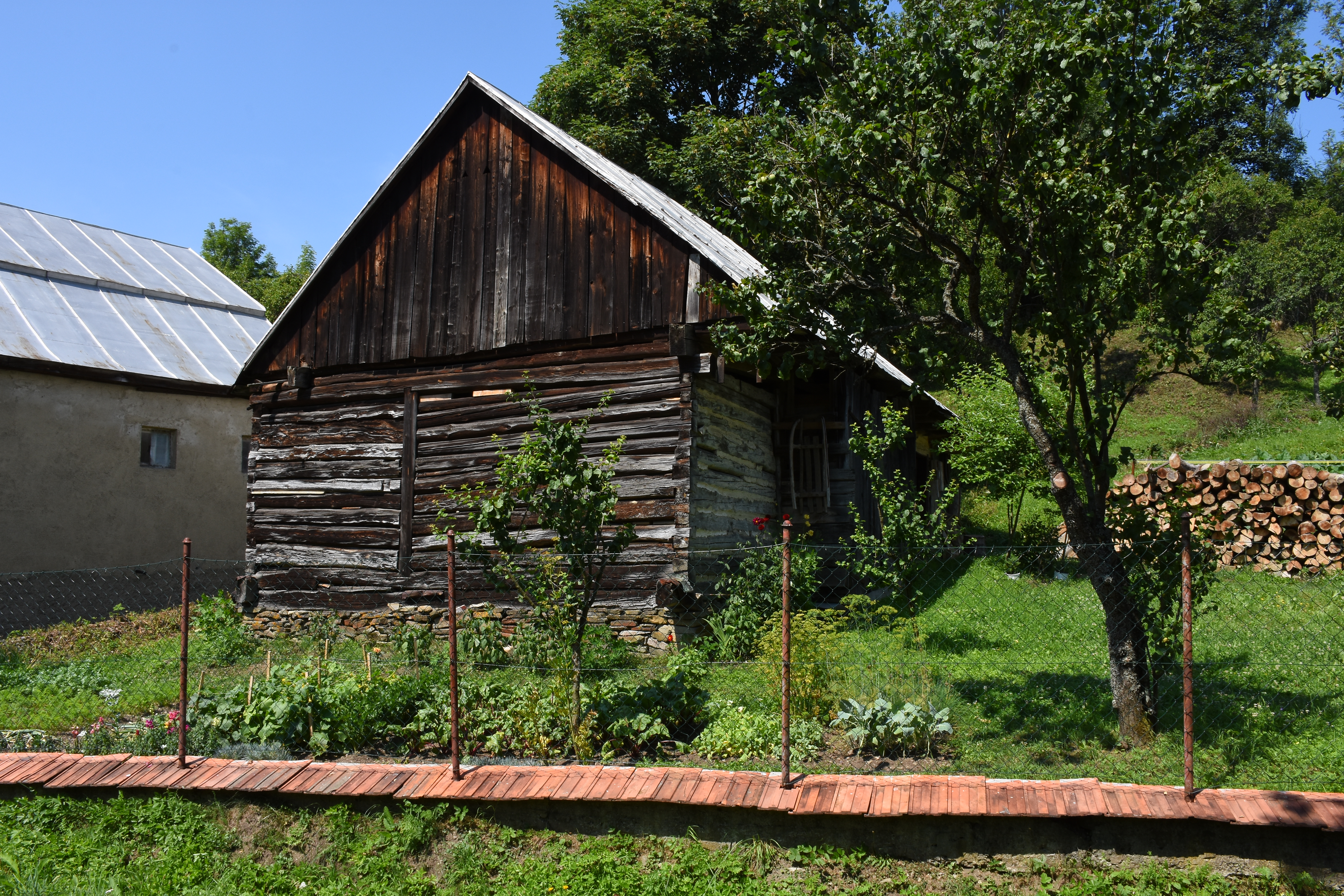
Traditional wooden barn in Palota

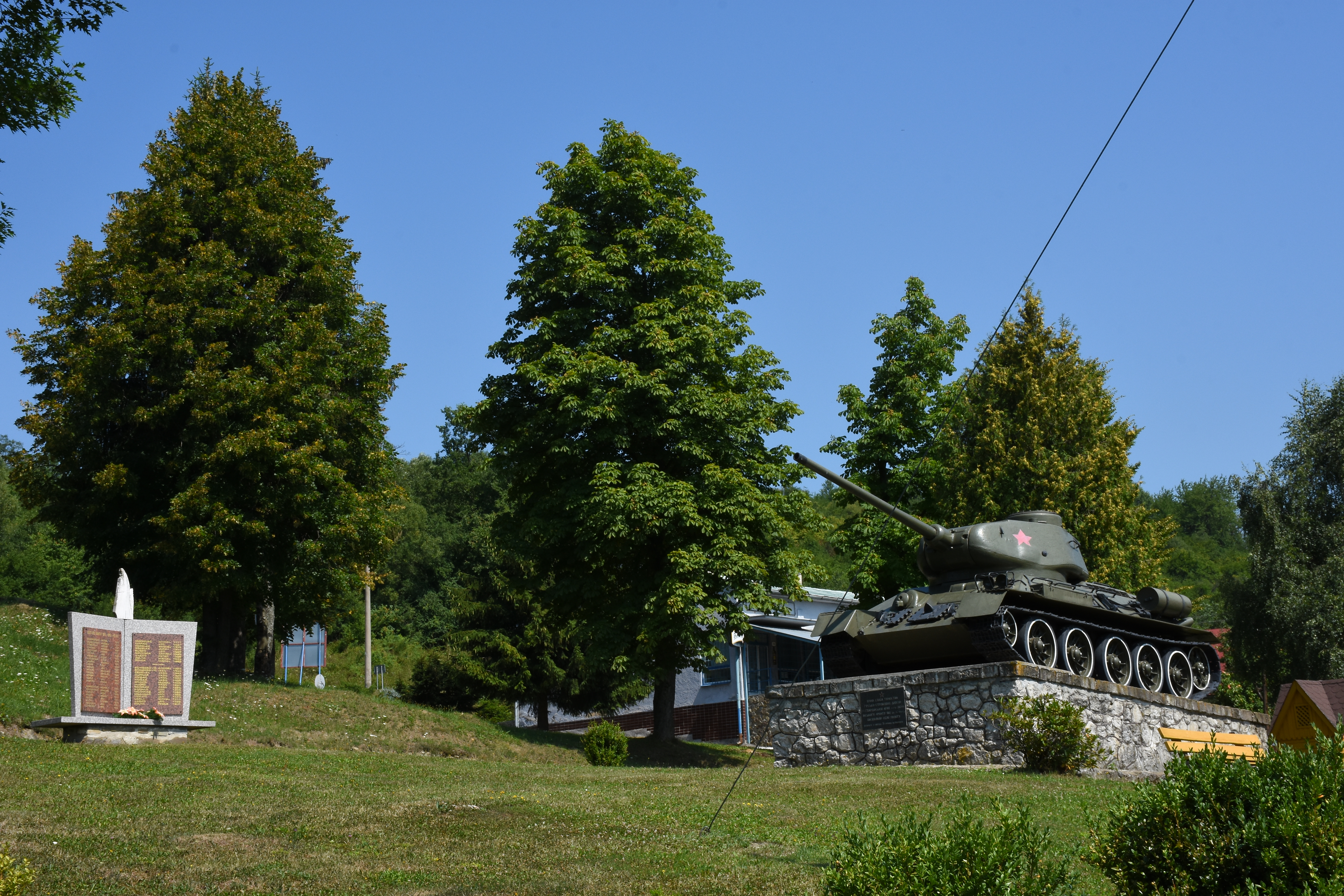
Commemorative plaque and T-34 medium tank on public display at local WWII memorial

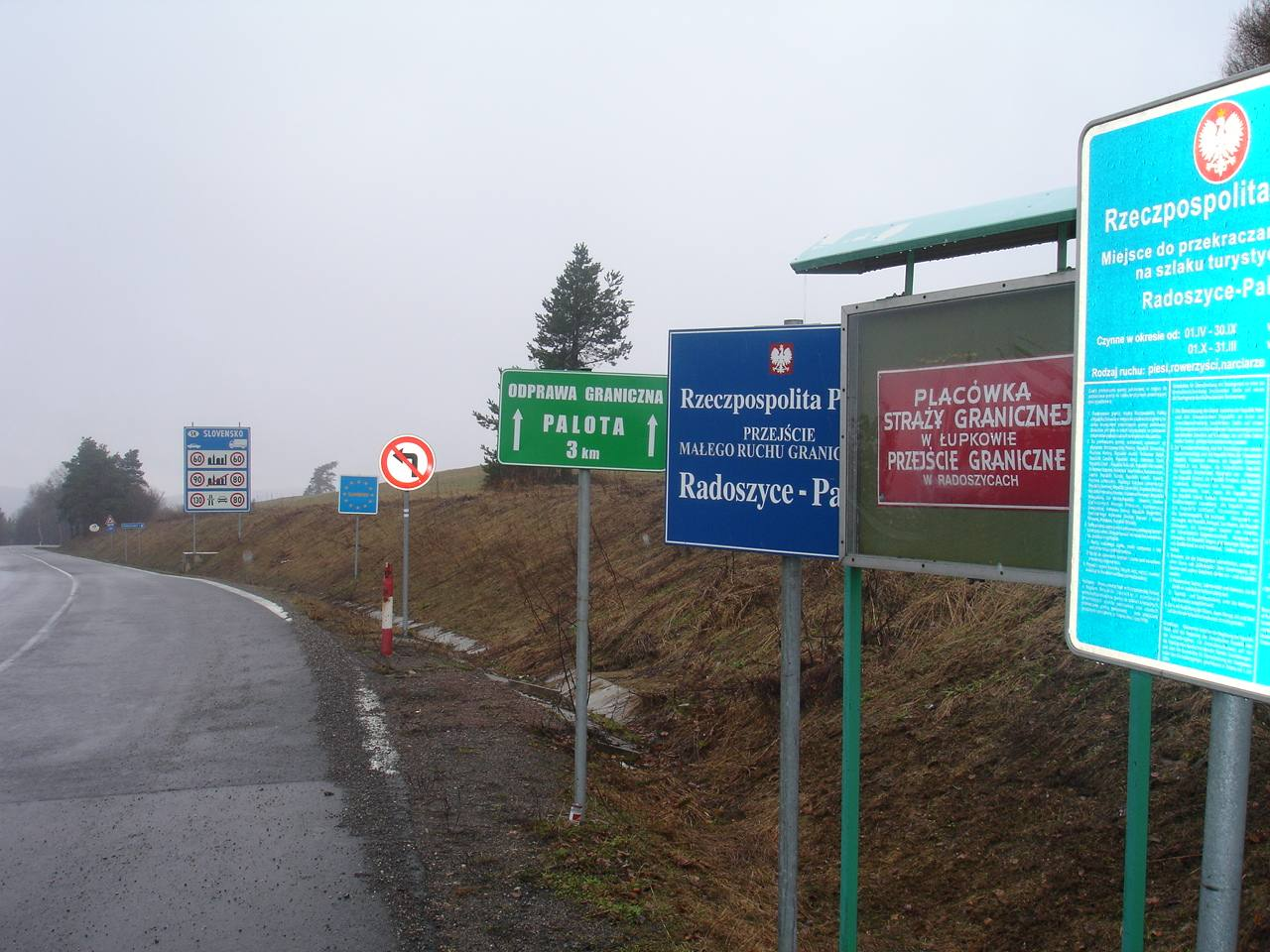
The Palota-Radoszyce foot-only border crossing between Poland and Slovakia

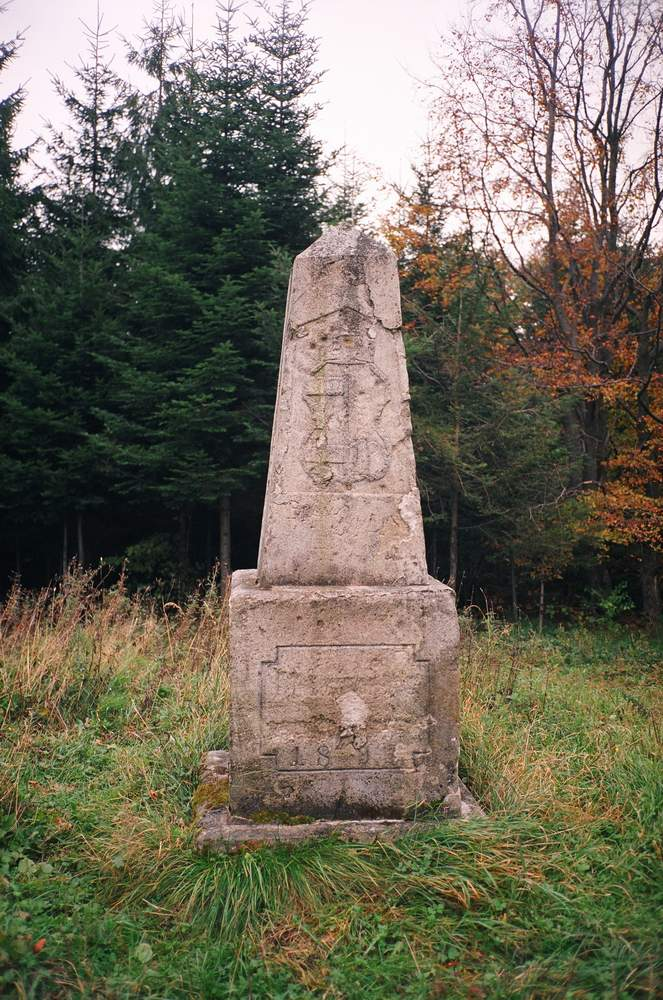
1890s boundary stone at the Palota-Radoszyce foot-only border crossing between Poland and Slovakia
