= Bukowsko =

- Village
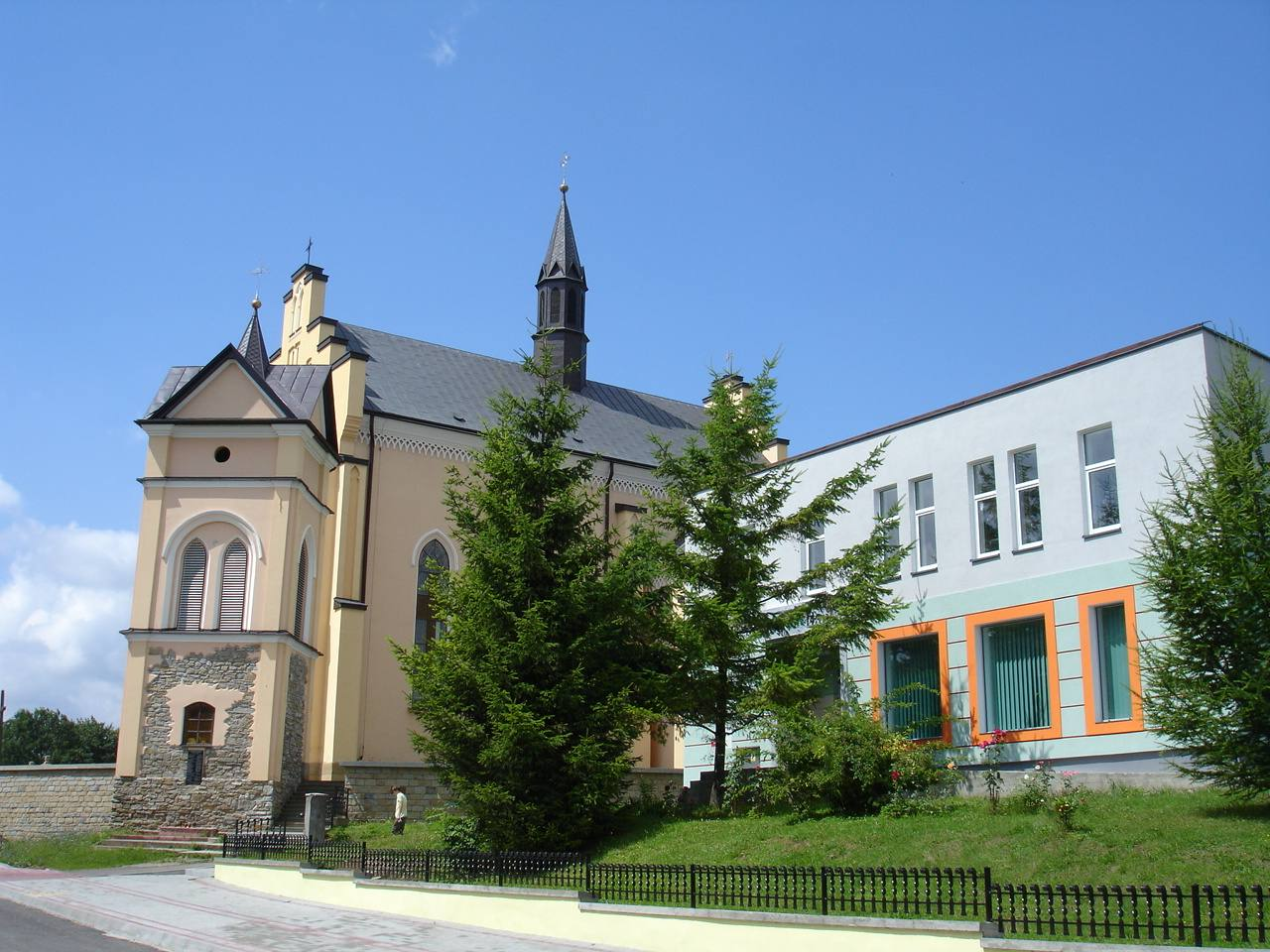
- Main street in Bukowsko, Catholic Church and city bank.

- Coat of arms
- Etymology: Its name comes from the Slavic word buk, meaning "beech" (beech wood)
- Location within Poland
- Coordinates: 49°28′44″N 22°03′37″E
- Country: Poland
- Voivodeship: Subcarpathian
- County: Sanok
- Gmina: Bukowsko
- First mentioned: 1361

Area
  - Total: 8.2 km^{2} (3.2 sq mi)
- Elevation: 340 m (1,120 ft)

Population (31 December 2002)
  - Total: 1,500
  - Density: 180/km^{2} (470/sq mi)
- Time zone: UTC+1 (CET)
  - Summer (DST): UTC+2 (CEST)
- Postal code: 38 504
- Car plate: KUS, RSA
- Website: https://www.bukowsko.pl

Bukowsko (Polish: [buˈkɔfskɔ]) is a village in Sanok County, Subcarpathian Voivodeship, Poland. It lies in the Bukowsko Upland mountains. During the Polish–Lithuanian Commonwealth it was in Lesser Poland prowincja.

== Characteristics ==
Bukowsko is the administrative and cultural centre of the Gmina Bukowsko. It is crossed by the rail road connecting it with Slovakia. It is especially the private sector and service industries that are developing rapidly at this time.

It is home to the Uniwersytet Ludowy, opened in 2005, which contains many artworks and effects of the folk handworks inspiration. Bukowsko is situated in the poorest region of Poland.

== History ==
Settled in prehistoric times, the southern-eastern Poland region that is now Podkarpacie was overrun in pre-Roman times by various tribes, including the Celts, Goths and Vandals (Przeworsk culture). After the fall of the Roman Empire, of which most of south-eastern Poland was part (all parts below the San), the area was invaded by Hungarians and Slavs.

The region subsequently became part of the Great Moravian state. Upon the invasion of the Hungarian tribes into the heart of the Great Moravian Empire around 899, the Lendians of the area declared their allegiance to Hungarian Empire. The region then became a site of contention between Poland, Kievan Rus and Hungary starting in at least the 9th century. This area was mentioned for the first time in 981 (by Nestor), when Volodymyr the Great of Kievan Rus took the area over on the way into Poland. In 1018 it returned to Poland, 1031 back to Rus, in 1340 Casimir III of Poland recovered it.

In historical records the village was first mentioned in 1361. During 966–1018, 1340–1772 (Ruthenian Voivodeship) and during 1918–39 Bukowsko was part of Poland. While during 1772–1918 it belonged to Austrian empire, later Austrian-Hungarian empire when double monarchy was introduced in Austria. This part of Poland was controlled by Austria for almost 120 years. At that time the area (including west and east of Subcarpathian Voivodship) was known as Galicia. It was given the Magdeburg law in 1768. In 1785 the village lands comprised 6.5 km^{2} (2.5 sq mi). There were 700 Catholics. In 1864 Rabbi Shlomo Halberstam was appointed as rabbi of the Jewish community of Bukowsko. He held this position until 1879.

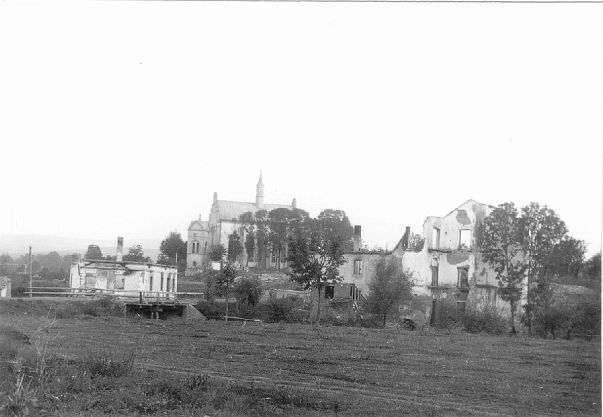
The city of Bukowsko burned down by the UPA in 1946

After the Nazis had captured the town, Jewish homes and shops were robbed by the civilians from neighbouring towns. In the spring of 1942, 804 Jews of Bukowsko and over 300 of the surrounding villages were put into a ghetto. Out of that number over 100 were shot on the local (Jewish) cemetery. The rest were transported to the camp in Zwangsarbeitslager Zaslaw. None of the prayer houses survived the war. Only a few matzevahs remained on the cemetery. Bukowsko also had a labour camp which existed from August to October 1942. The Jews, 60 on average, carried out road construction.

An April 1946 New York Times article reported that on 4 April 1946, 389 of the 400 buildings in the village were burned down and 3,000 people were made homeless by a force of Ukrainian nationalists and German deserters operating in the area who had a few days earlier demanded, but not received, a payment of 1 million złoty. The village was also burned in whole or in part January, March and November 1946. Only over a dozen years after the war the village started to rebuild.

== Geography ==
The municipality lies at an altitude of 482 metres (1,581 feet) above sea level and covers an area of 8.3 square kilometres (3.2 square miles). It has a population of about 1500 people. The village of Bukowsko lies in a valley of the Sanoczek river in southeastern Poland. The hills of the Bieszczady mountain range are typical for this countryside. Time zone: UTC+1/SummerUTC+2 Village parts: Dział; Sanoczek; Łaźniakowa Góra; Podwapienne; Pasieki.

== International relations ==
=== Twin towns — Sister cities ===
Bukowsko is twinned with:

- Topoľovka, Slovakia
- Maizières-lès-Metz, France

== Notable residents ==
- Rabbi Shlomo Halberstam, first Bobover Rebbe
- Alojzy Ehrlich, (Hasmonea Lwów)
- Wojciech Bursa sports shooter

== Hiking trails ==
- European walking route E8

== Literature ==
- Prof. Adam Fastnacht. Slownik Historyczno-Geograficzny Ziemi Sanockiej w Średniowieczu (Historic-Geographic Dictionary of the Sanok District in the Middle Ages), Kraków, 2002, ISBN 83-88385-14-3.
- Jerzy Zuba. "W Gminie Bukowsko." Roksana, 2004, ISBN 83-7343-150-0 (Polish). English translation, Deborah Greenlee, Editor, 2005, Arlington, TX 76016.
