= Adam Fastnacht =

Polish historian

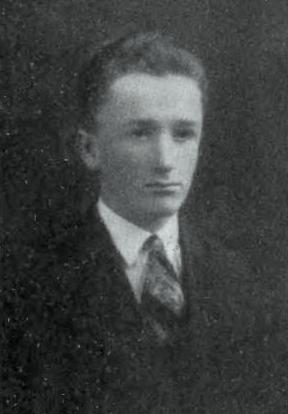
- Born: Adam Romuald Stanisław Fastnacht; 27 July 1913; Sanok, Kingdom of Galicia and Lodomeria, Austria-Hungary
- Died: 16 February 1987 (aged 73); Wrocław, Wrocław Voivodeship, Polish People's Republic
- Parents: Władysław Bolesław Fastnacht (father); Zofia Maria née Wołoszczak (mother)

Academic background
- Education: Jagiellonian University
- Thesis: Osadnictwo ziemi sanockiej w latach 1340–1650 (1946)
- Doctoral advisor: Franciszek Bujak

Academic work
- Discipline: History
- Sub-discipline: Local history
- Main interests: History of Sanok Land
- Military service
- Allegiance: Polish Underground State
- Branch: Union of Armed Struggle; Home Army
- Conflict: WWII

Adam Fastnacht (27 July 1913, in Sanok – 16 February 1987, in Wrocław) doctor hab., historian, editor. He was a Polish historian, researcher of the history of the town and the district of Sanok Land. Fastnacht was born to a German family who settled in the east. He studied in Sanok, in Lwów at Lviv University under Franciszek Bujak and at the Jagiellonian University in Kraków, where in 1946 he received his PhD. Fastnacht was a member of the Armia Krajowa.

He was long-standing curator of the Ossolineum .

== Bibliography ==
- Adam Fastnacht, Slownik Historyczno-Geograficzny Ziemi Sanockiej w Średniowieczu (Historic-Geographic Dictionary of the Sanok District in the Middle Ages), Kraków, (II edition 2002), ISBN 83-88385-14-3.
- Osadnictwo Ziemi Sanockiej w latach 1340-1650, Wrocław 1962
- Zarys dziejów Sanoka. W: Księga pamiątkowa Gimnazjum Męskiego w Sanoku 1888-1958, Kraków 1958
- Dzieje Leska do 1772 roku, Rzeszów 1988
- Sanok. Materiały do dziejów miasta do XVII wieku, Opracował prof. Feliks Kiryk, Brzozów, 1990
