= Wola Krecowska =

- Village
- Location within Poland
- Coordinates: 49°36′55″N 22°20′17″E
- Country: Poland
- Voivodeship: Podkarpackie
- County: Sanok
- Gmina: Tyrawa Wołoska

Wola Krecowska [ˈvɔla krɛˈt͡sɔfska] is a village in the administrative district of Gmina Tyrawa Wołoska, within Sanok County, Podkarpackie Voivodeship, in south-eastern Poland.
