= Długie, Sanok County =

Długie
- Village
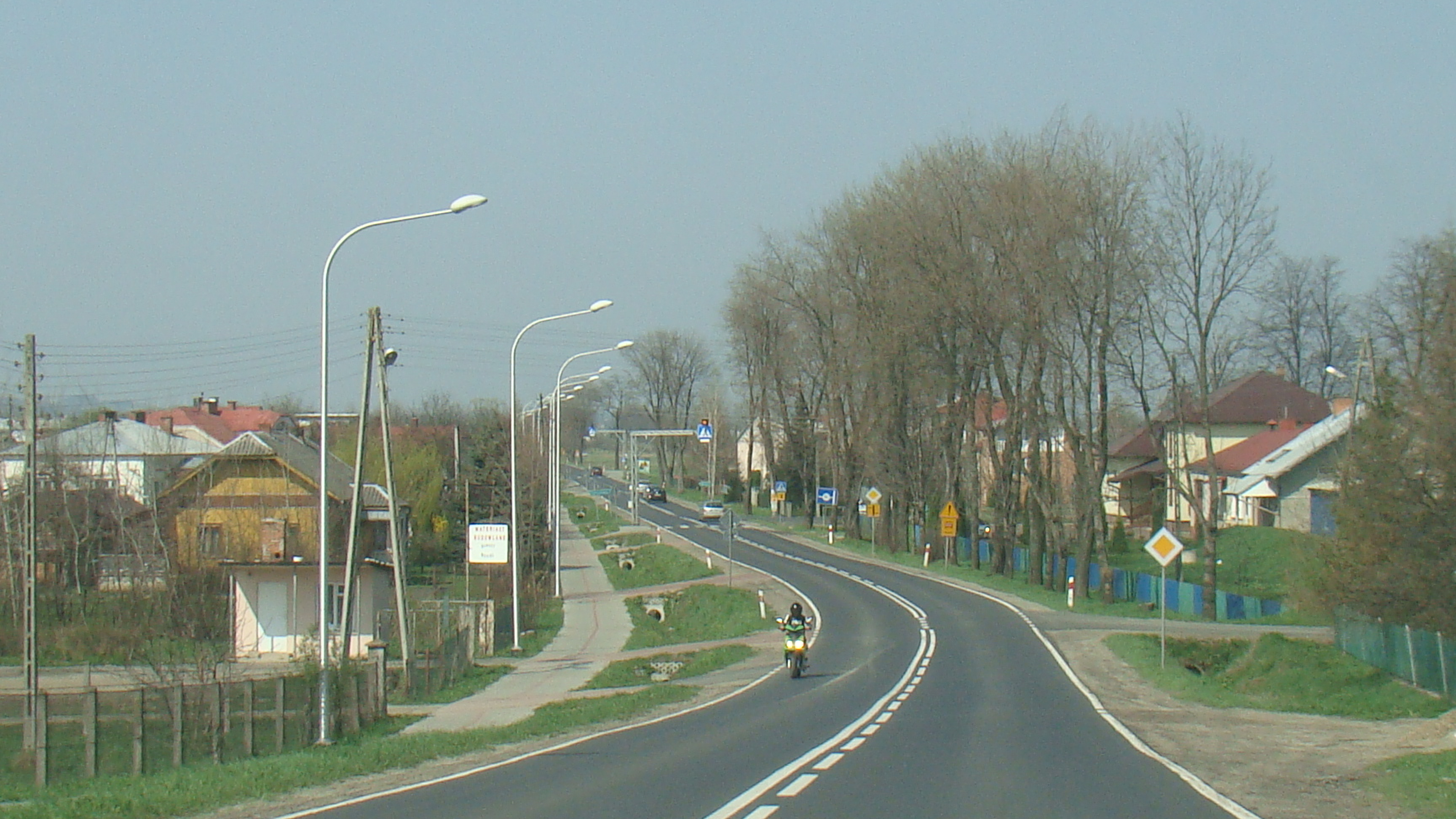

- Location within Poland
- Coordinates: 49°34′36″N 22°2′44″E
- Country: Poland
- Voivodeship: Subcarpathian
- County: Sanok
- Gmina: Zarszyn
- Population: 2,600

Długie [ˈdwuɡʲɛ] is a village in the administrative district of Gmina Zarszyn, within Sanok County, Subcarpathian Voivodeship, in south-eastern Poland.
