= Granicznik, Podkarpackie Voivodeship =

Granicznik
- Village
- Location within Poland
- Coordinates: 49°36′44″N 22°2′52″E
- Country: Poland
- Voivodeship: Subcarpathian
- County: Sanok
- Gmina: Zarszyn

Granicznik [ɡraˈɲit͡ʂɲik] is a village in the administrative district of Gmina Zarszyn, within Sanok County, Subcarpathian Voivodeship, in south-eastern Poland.
