= Kreców =

- Village
- Location within Poland
- Coordinates: 49°36′38″N 22°21′58″E
- Country: Poland
- Voivodeship: Podkarpackie
- County: Sanok
- Gmina: Tyrawa Wołoska
- Population: 10

Kreców [ˈkrɛt͡suf] is a village in the administrative district of Gmina Tyrawa Wołoska, within Sanok County, Podkarpackie Voivodeship, in south-eastern Poland.
