= Nowosielce, Sanok County =

Nowosielce
- Village
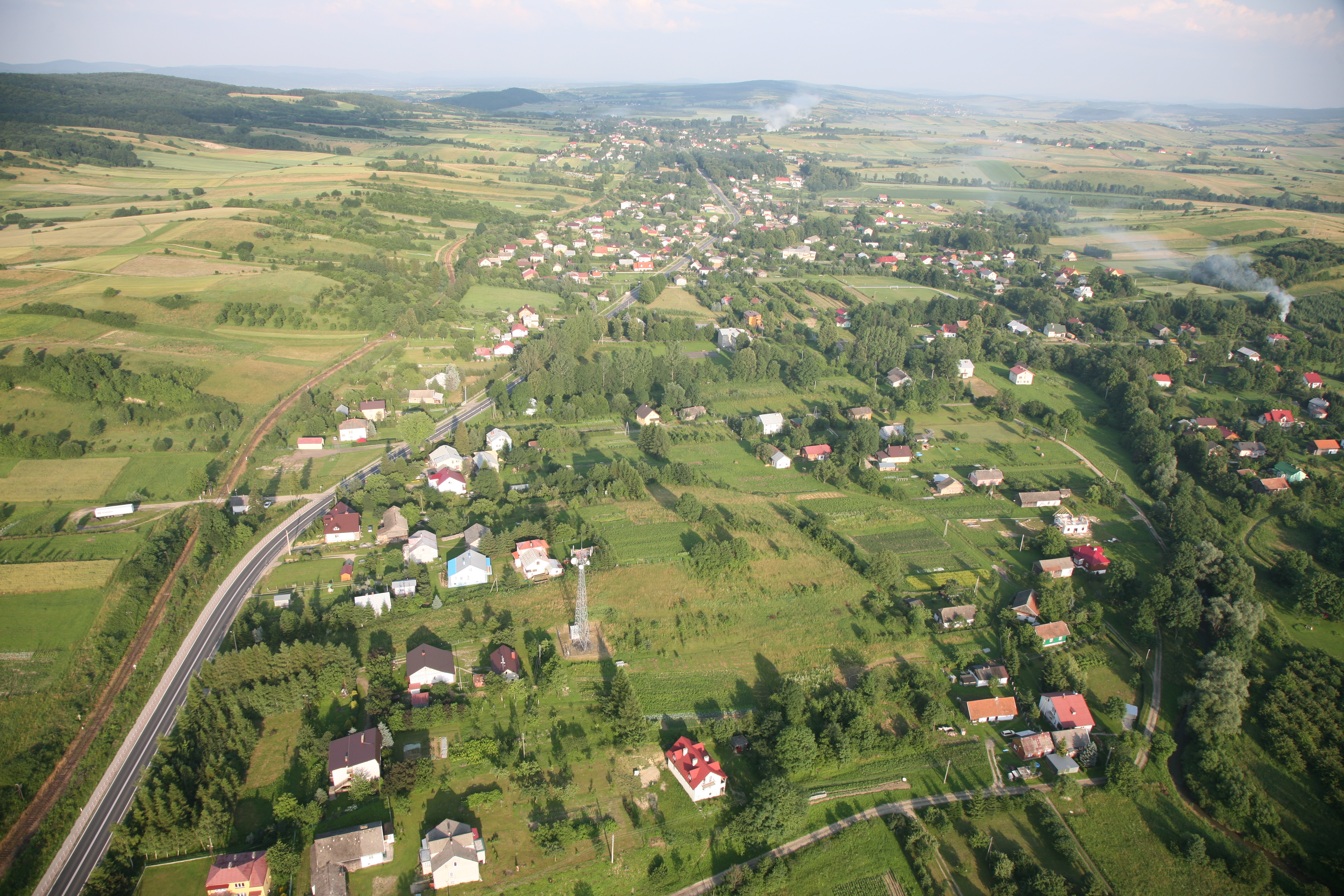
- Aerial view of Nowosielce

- Location within Poland
- Coordinates: 49°34′N 22°4′E
- Country: Poland
- Voivodeship: Subcarpathian
- County: Sanok
- Gmina: Zarszyn

Population
  - Total: 1,200
- Time zone: UTC+1 (CET)
  - Summer (DST): UTC+2 (CEST)
- Vehicle registration: RSA

Nowosielce [nɔvɔˈɕɛlt͡sɛ] is a village in the administrative district of Gmina Zarszyn, within Sanok County, Subcarpathian Voivodeship, in south-eastern Poland.
