= Odrzechowa =

Polish village in Sanok County

- Village
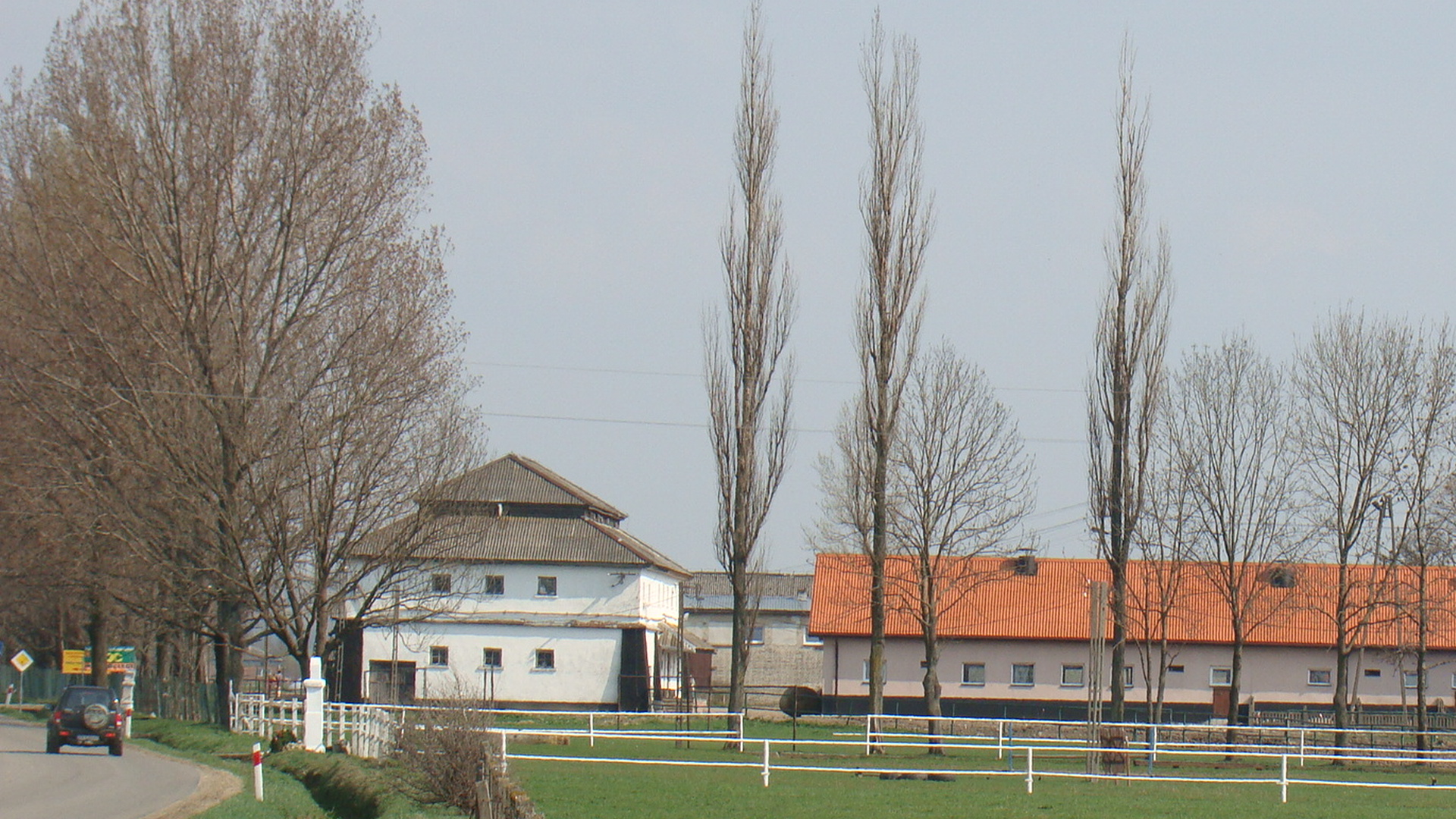

- Location within Poland
- Coordinates: 49°34′N 21°59′E
- Country: Poland
- Voivodeship: Subcarpathian
- County: Sanok
- Gmina: Zarszyn
- Population: 1,400

Odrzechowa (Polish pronunciation: [ɔdʐɛˈxɔva]) is a village in the administrative district of Gmina Zarszyn, within Sanok County, Subcarpathian Voivodeship, in south-eastern Poland.
