= Hołuczków =

- Village
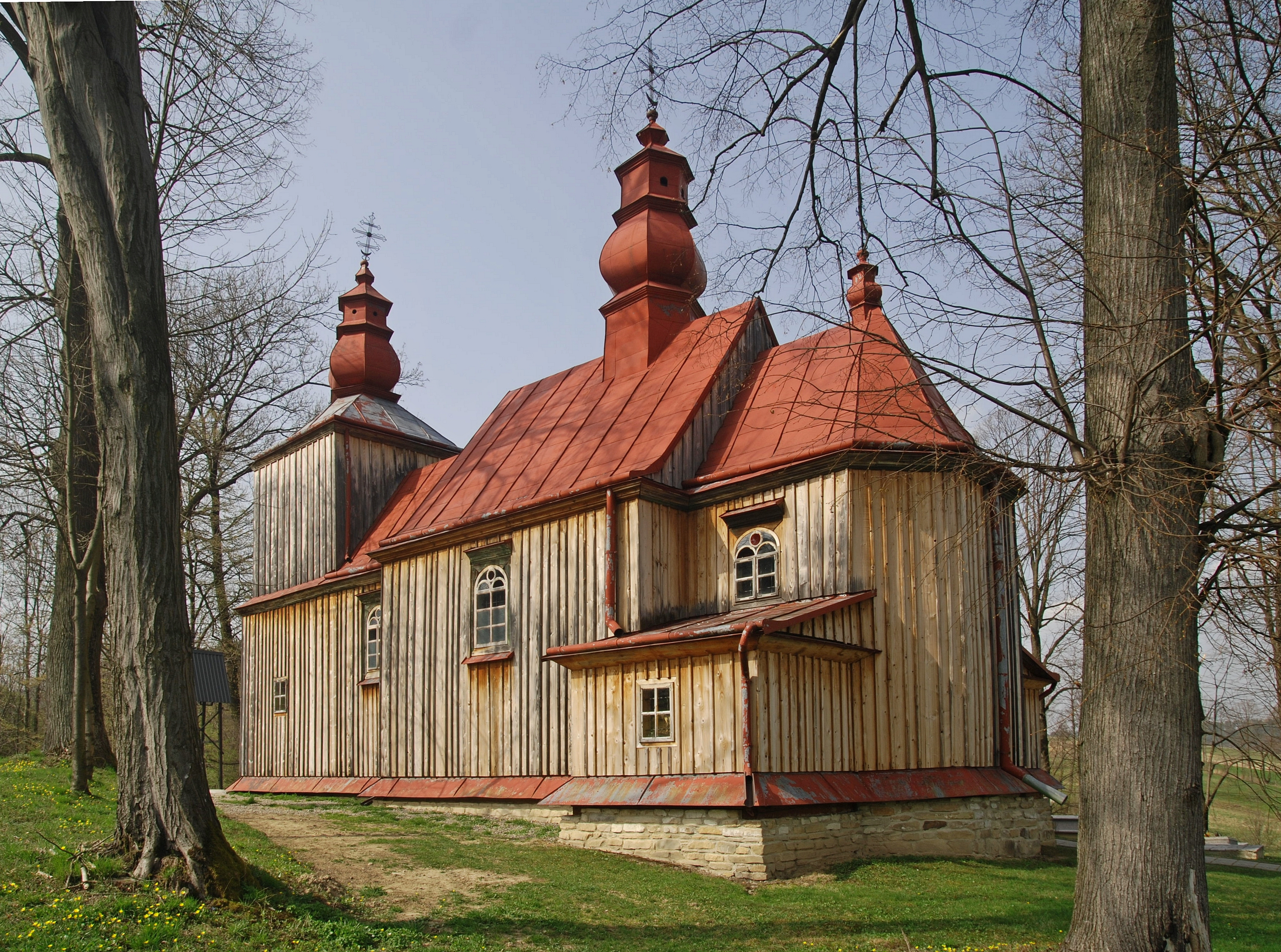
- Church of Saint Paraskevas

- Location within Poland
- Coordinates: 49°36′N 22°20′E
- Country: Poland
- Voivodeship: Subcarpathian
- County: Sanok
- Gmina: Tyrawa Wołoska

Population
  - Total: 210

Hołuczków [xɔˈwut͡ʂkuf] is a village in the administrative district of Gmina Tyrawa Wołoska, within Sanok County, Subcarpathian Voivodeship, in southeastern Poland.
