= Lachawa =

- Village
- Location within Poland
- Coordinates: 49°38′51″N 22°22′0″E
- Country: Poland
- Voivodeship: Subcarpathian
- County: Sanok
- Gmina: Tyrawa Wołoska
- Population: 0

Lachawa [laˈxava] is a former village in the administrative district of Gmina Tyrawa Wołoska, within Sanok County, Subcarpathian Voivodeship, in south-eastern Poland.
