= Pastwiska, Podkarpackie Voivodeship =

Pastwiska
- Village
- Location within Poland
- Coordinates: 49°32′12″N 21°55′58″E
- Country: Poland
- Voivodeship: Subcarpathian
- County: Sanok
- Gmina: Zarszyn
- Population: 140

Pastwiska [pastˈfʲiska] is a village in the administrative district of Gmina Zarszyn, within Sanok County, Subcarpathian Voivodeship, in south-eastern Poland.

In the village there is the small church of St Jozef with connections to John Paul II. There are several artefacts displayed given by him to the church the largest being a statue of Madonna. There is a tablet on the village hall denoting the visits of Cardinal Wojtyla when he shopped there and a museum to commemorate his life is housed above the village hall.

There is an all weather multi sports pitch together with a children's playground central to the village. At the far end of the village towards the forest there is a bar which has summer opening whilst opposite the village hall is a general store with a house and bungalow offering year round accommodation for tourists.

== Memorial ==
Close by the village hall there is a large stone memorial commemorating the death on 18 September 1944 of the Czechoslovak war hero František Geisler who was killed by the Germans in the battle for Pastwiska during the early days of the Carpathian Campaign and the battle for Dukla Pass. He had already fought in the battles for Zarszyn and Besko where he was decorated for rescuing his wounded soldiers from the battlefield.

In September 2019 a Museum dedicated to František Geisler was opened, the museum is situated next to the Memorial.

During the battle for Pastwiska the Manor House was destroyed however the Manor House Park remains and at the side of the road there is a small chapel whilst in the fields beyond there is a wooded circle of trees marking the burial place of victims of the Plague in the 19th century.
