= Rozpucie =

- Village
- Location within Poland
- Coordinates: 49°36′N 22°24′E
- Country: Poland
- Voivodeship: Subcarpathian
- County: Sanok
- Gmina: Tyrawa Wołoska
- Population: 460

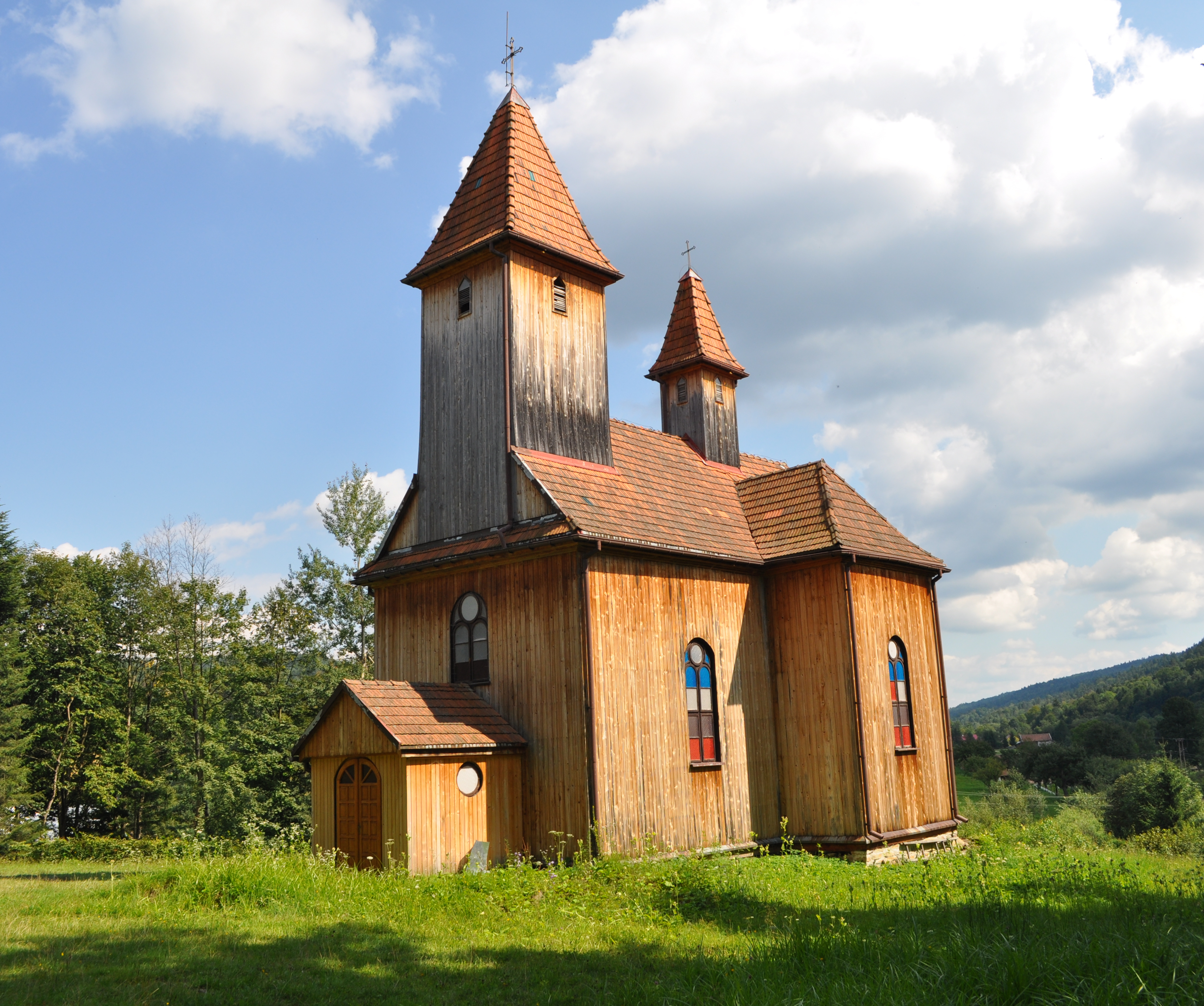
Church in Rozpucie

Rozpucie [rɔsˈput͡ɕɛ] is a village in the administrative district of Gmina Tyrawa Wołoska, within Sanok County, Subcarpathian Voivodeship, in south-eastern Poland.
