= Mroczkówki =

- Settlement
- Location within Poland
- Coordinates: 49°31′51″N 22°1′14″E
- Country: Poland
- Voivodeship: Subcarpathian
- County: Sanok
- Gmina: Zarszyn

Mroczkówki (Polish pronunciation: [mrɔt͡ʂˈkufkʲi]) is a settlement in the administrative district of Gmina Zarszyn, within Sanok County, Subcarpathian Voivodeship, in south-eastern Poland.
