= Koszary, Sanok County =

Koszary
- Settlement
- Location within Poland
- Coordinates: 49°35′37″N 22°2′56″E
- Country: Poland
- Voivodeship: Subcarpathian
- County: Sanok
- Gmina: Zarszyn

Koszary [kɔˈʂarɨ] is a settlement in the administrative district of Gmina Zarszyn, within Sanok County, Subcarpathian Voivodeship, in south-eastern Poland.
