= Posada Jaćmierska Górna =

- Village
- Location within Poland
- Coordinates: 49°36′41″N 22°01′28″E
- Country: Poland
- Voivodeship: Podkarpackie
- County: Sanok
- Gmina: Zarszyn

Posada Jaćmierska Górna [pɔˈsada jat͡ɕˈmʲɛrska ˈɡurna] is a village in the administrative district of Gmina Zarszyn, within Sanok County, Podkarpackie Voivodeship, in south-eastern Poland.
