= Posada Zarszyńska =

- Village
- Location within Poland
- Coordinates: 49°35′N 22°1′E
- Country: Poland
- Voivodeship: Subcarpathian
- County: Sanok
- Gmina: Zarszyn

Posada Zarszyńska [pɔˈsada zarˈʂɨɲska] is a village in the administrative district of Gmina Zarszyn, within Sanok County, Subcarpathian Voivodeship, in south-eastern Poland.
