= Jaćmierz =

- Village
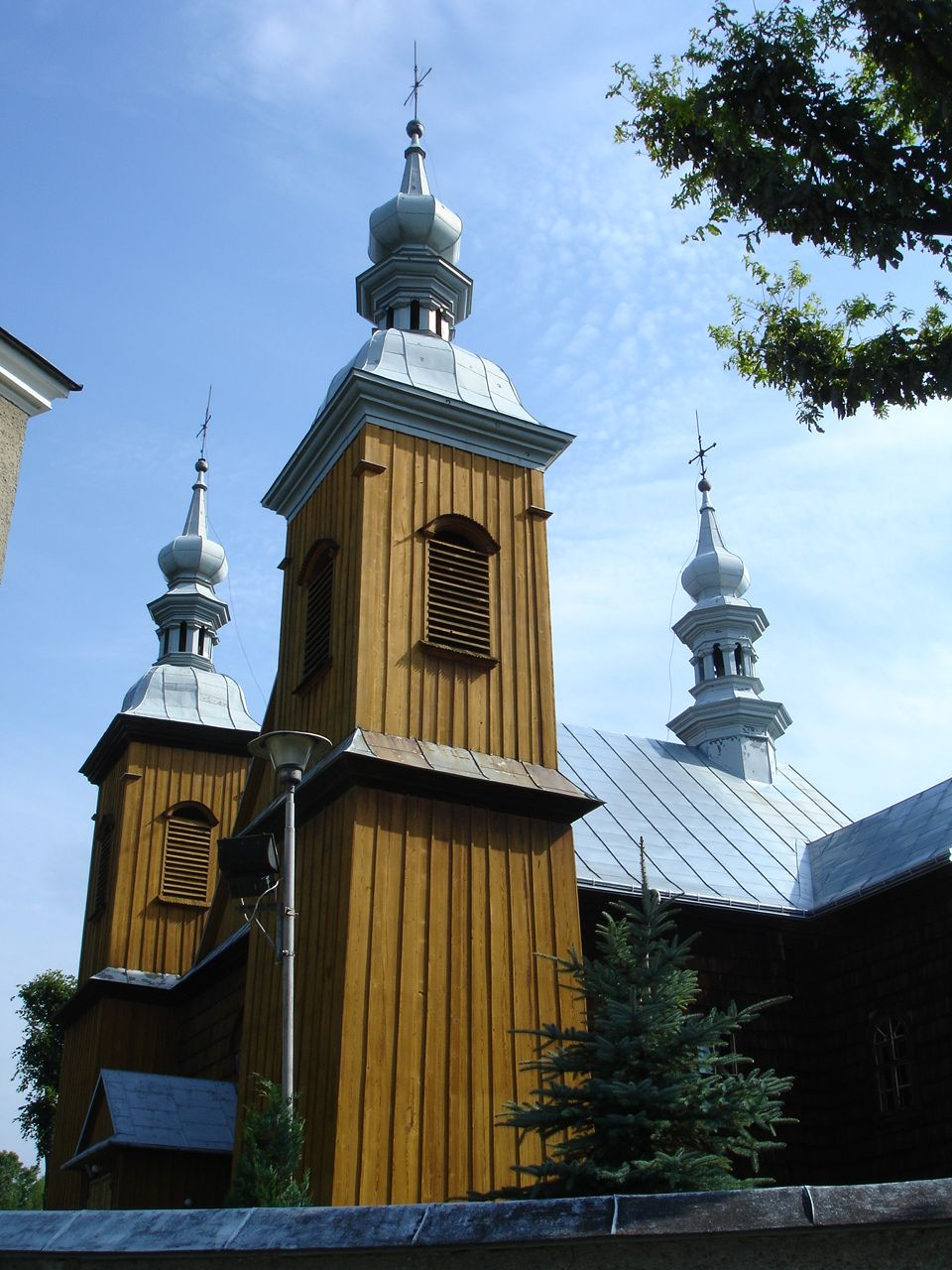
- Church

- Coat of arms

- Location within Poland
- Coordinates: 49°37′N 22°1′E
- Country: Poland
- Voivodeship: Subcarpathian
- County: Sanok
- Gmina: Zarszyn
- Elevation: 398 m (1,306 ft)
- Population (approx.): 830

Jaćmierz [ˈjat͡ɕmʲɛʂ] is a village in the administrative district of Gmina Zarszyn, within Sanok County, Subcarpathian Voivodeship, in south-eastern Poland.

== See also ==
- Walddeutsche
