= Rakowa =

- Village
- Location within Poland
- Coordinates: 49°34′N 22°24′E
- Country: Poland
- Voivodeship: Subcarpathian
- County: Sanok
- Gmina: Tyrawa Wołoska
- Population: 290

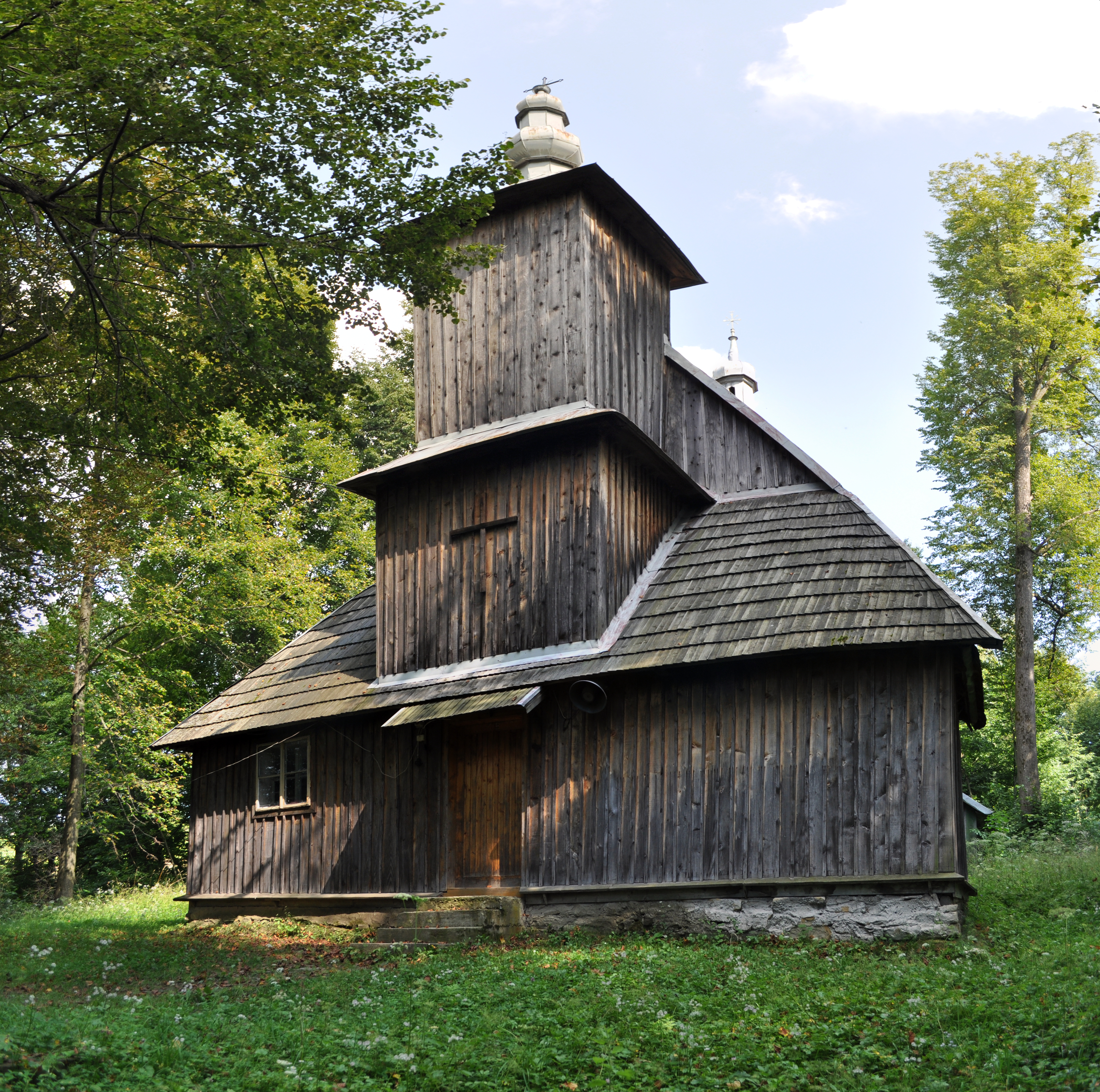
Church in Rakowa

Rakowa [raˈkɔva] is a village in the administrative district of Gmina Tyrawa Wołoska, within Sanok County, Subcarpathian Voivodeship, in south-eastern Poland.
