= Pielnia =

- Village
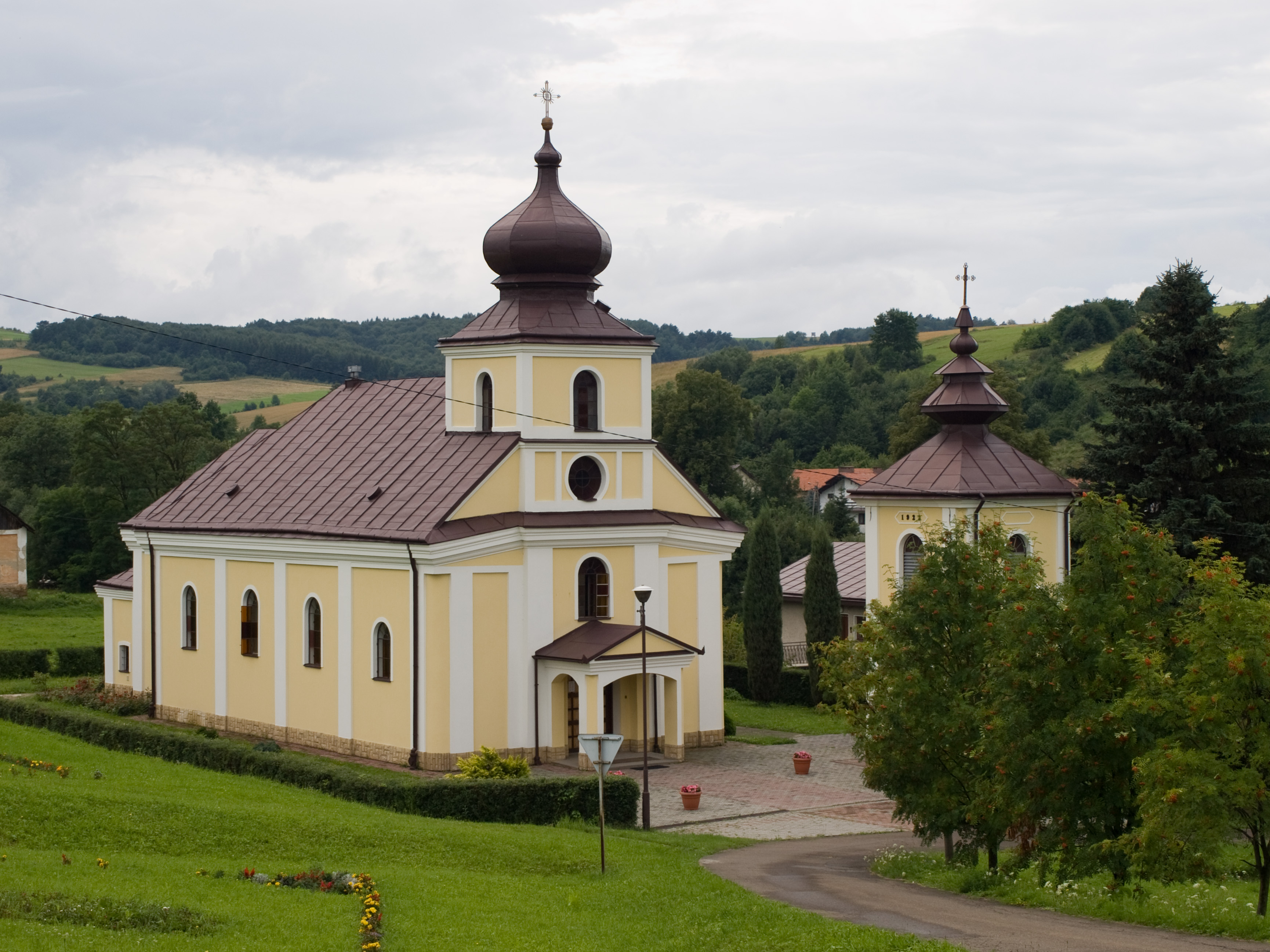

- Location within Poland
- Coordinates: 49°33′N 22°4′E
- Country: Poland
- Voivodeship: Subcarpathian
- County: Sanok
- Gmina: Zarszyn
- Population: 990

Pielnia [ˈpʲɛlɲa] is a village in the administrative district of Gmina Zarszyn, within Sanok County, Subcarpathian Voivodeship, in south-eastern Poland.

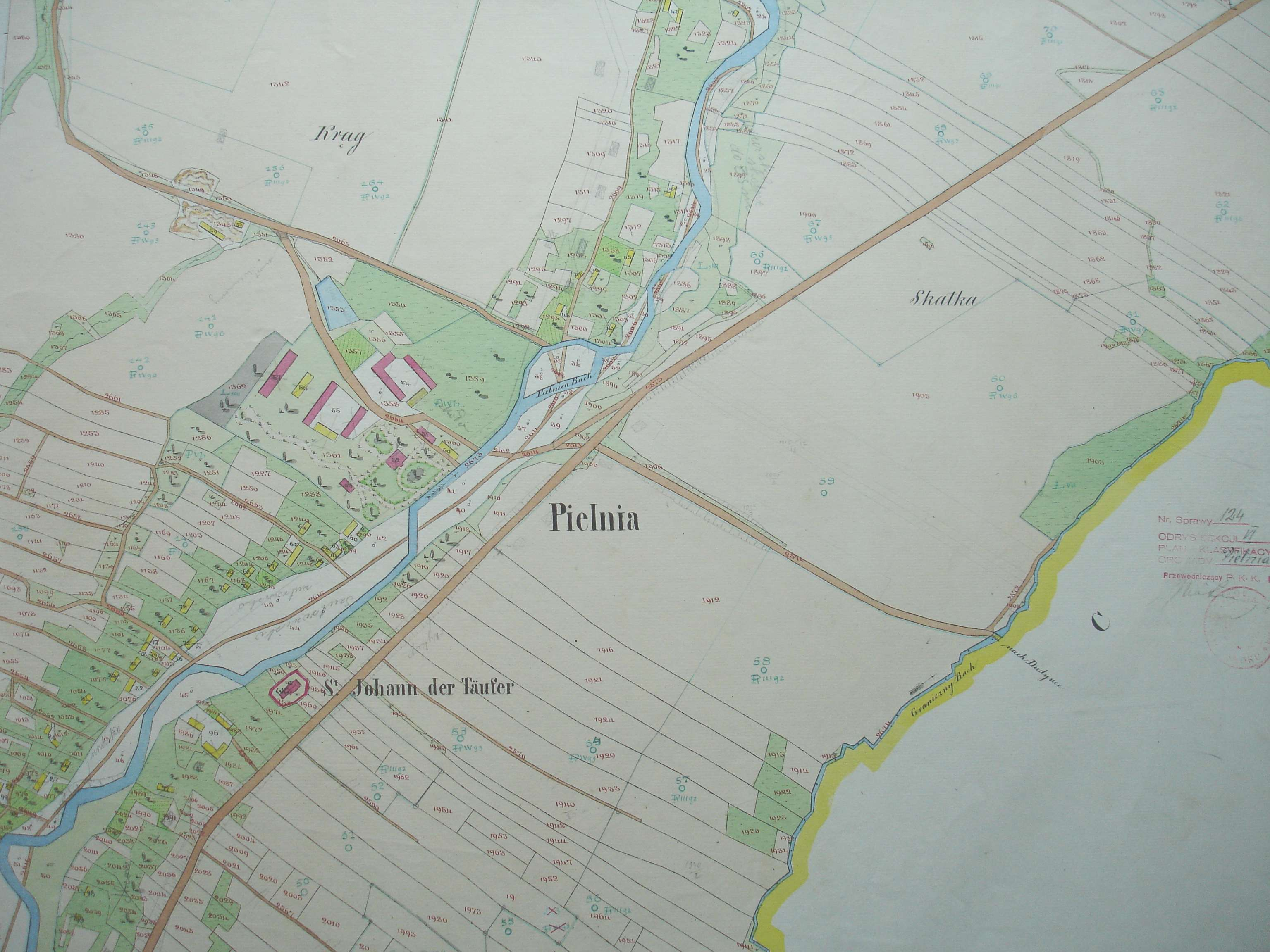
1852 cadastral map of Pielnia (then under rule of the Austrian Empire).
