= Siemuszowa =

- Village
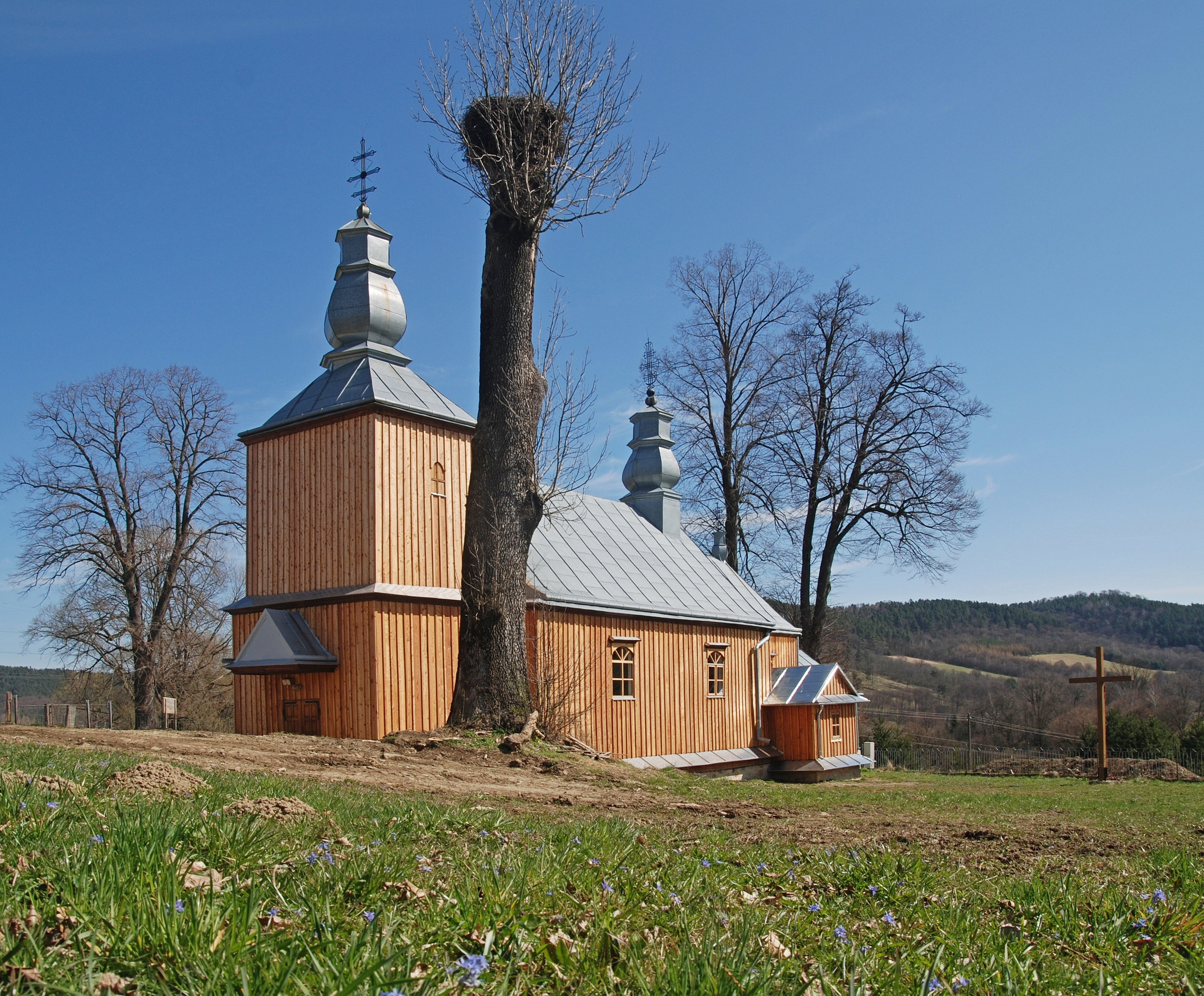
- Church of the Transfiguration of Christ

- Location within Poland
- Coordinates: 49°36′N 22°19′E
- Country: Poland
- Voivodeship: Subcarpathian
- County: Sanok
- Gmina: Tyrawa Wołoska

Population
  - Total: 220

Siemuszowa [ɕɛmuˈʂɔva] is a village in the administrative district of Gmina Tyrawa Wołoska, within Sanok County, Subcarpathian Voivodeship, in south-eastern Poland.
