= Bażanówka =

- Village
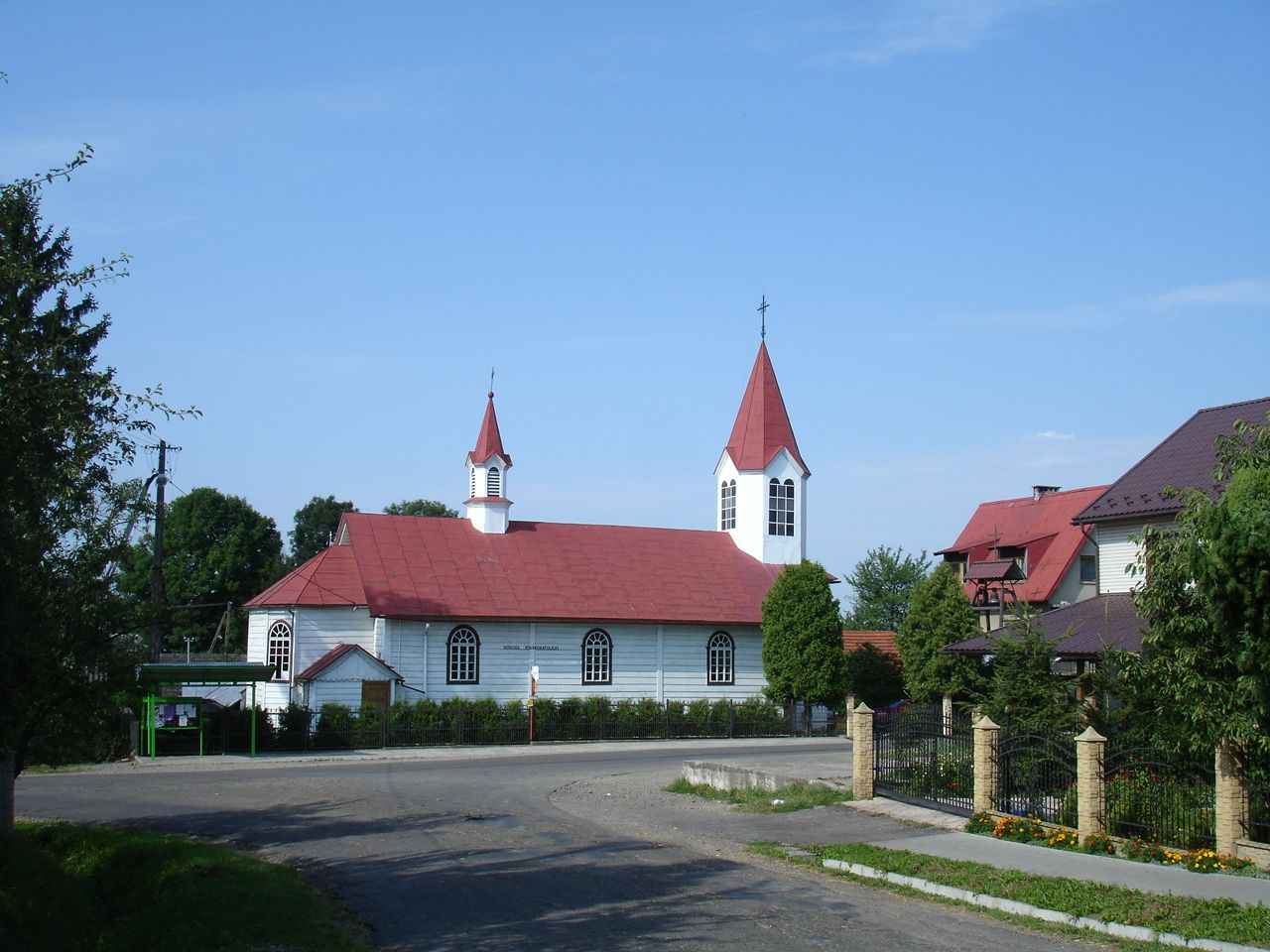
- Polish Catholic Church in the village

- Location within Poland
- Coordinates: 49°36′N 22°3′E
- Country: Poland
- Voivodeship: Subcarpathian
- County: Sanok
- Gmina: Zarszyn
- Population: 1,100

Bażanówka [baʐaˈnufka] is a village in the administrative district of Gmina Zarszyn, within Sanok County, Subcarpathian Voivodeship, in south-eastern Poland.
