= Gmina Tyrawa Wołoska =

Gmina Tyrawa Wołoska Tyrawa Wołoska Commune
- Gmina
- Flag Coat of arms
- Interactive map of Gmina Tyrawa Wołoska
- Coordinates (Tyrawa Wołoska): 49°35′N 22°22′E
- Country: Poland
- Voivodeship: Subcarpathian
- County: Sanok
- Seat: Tyrawa Wołoska

Area
  - Total: 69.3 km^{2} (26.8 sq mi)

Population (2006)
  - Total: 1,939
  - Density: 28.0/km^{2} (72.5/sq mi)
- Website: http://www.tyrawa.info

Gmina Tyrawa Wołoska is a rural gmina (administrative district) in Sanok County, Subcarpathian Voivodeship, in south-eastern Poland. Its seat is the village of Tyrawa Wołoska, which lies approximately 12 kilometres (7 mi) east of Sanok and 57 km (35 mi) south-east of the regional capital Rzeszów.

The gmina covers an area of 68.6 square kilometres (26.5 sq mi), and as of 2006 its total population is 1,939.

Ethnic Groups

- Poles

The gmina contains part of the protected area called Słonne Mountains Landscape Park.

== Villages ==
Gmina Tyrawa Wołoska contains the villages and settlements of Hołuczków, Kreców, Lachawa, Rakowa, Rozpucie, Siemuszowa, Tyrawa Wołoska and Wola Krecowska.

== Neighbouring gminas ==
Gmina Tyrawa Wołoska is bordered by the gminas of Bircza, Lesko, Olszanica and Sanok.

== Rural landscape picture ==
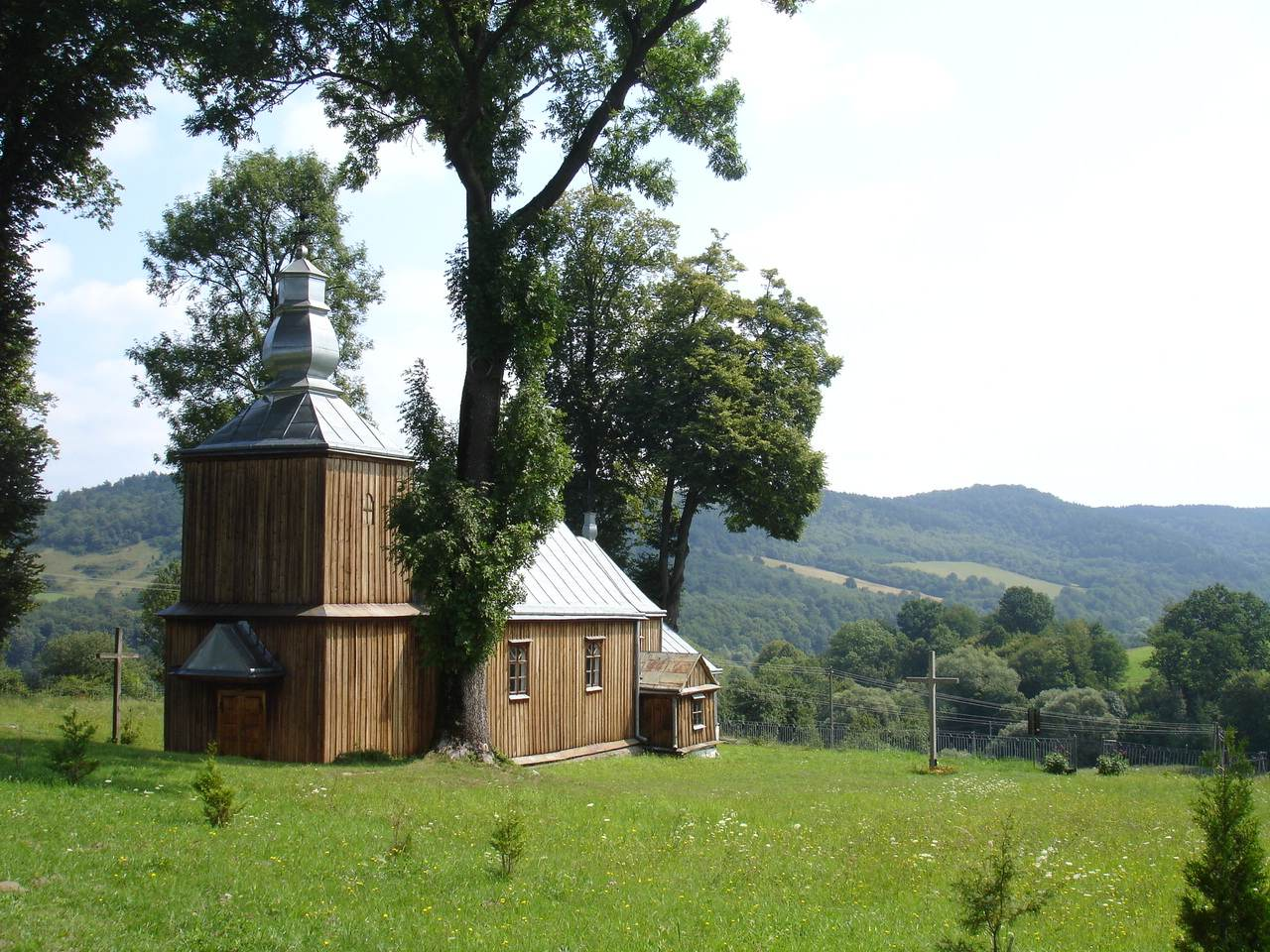

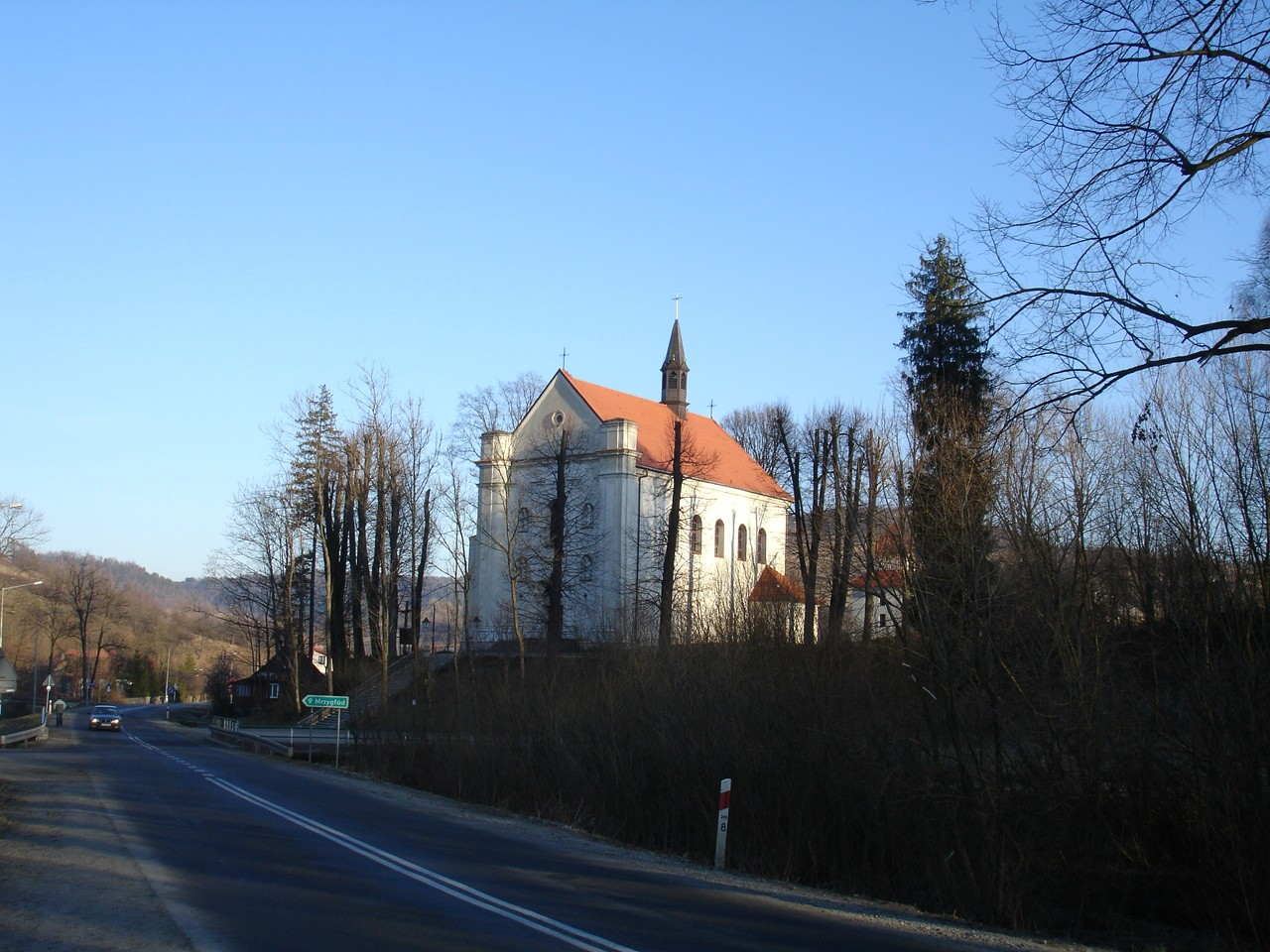

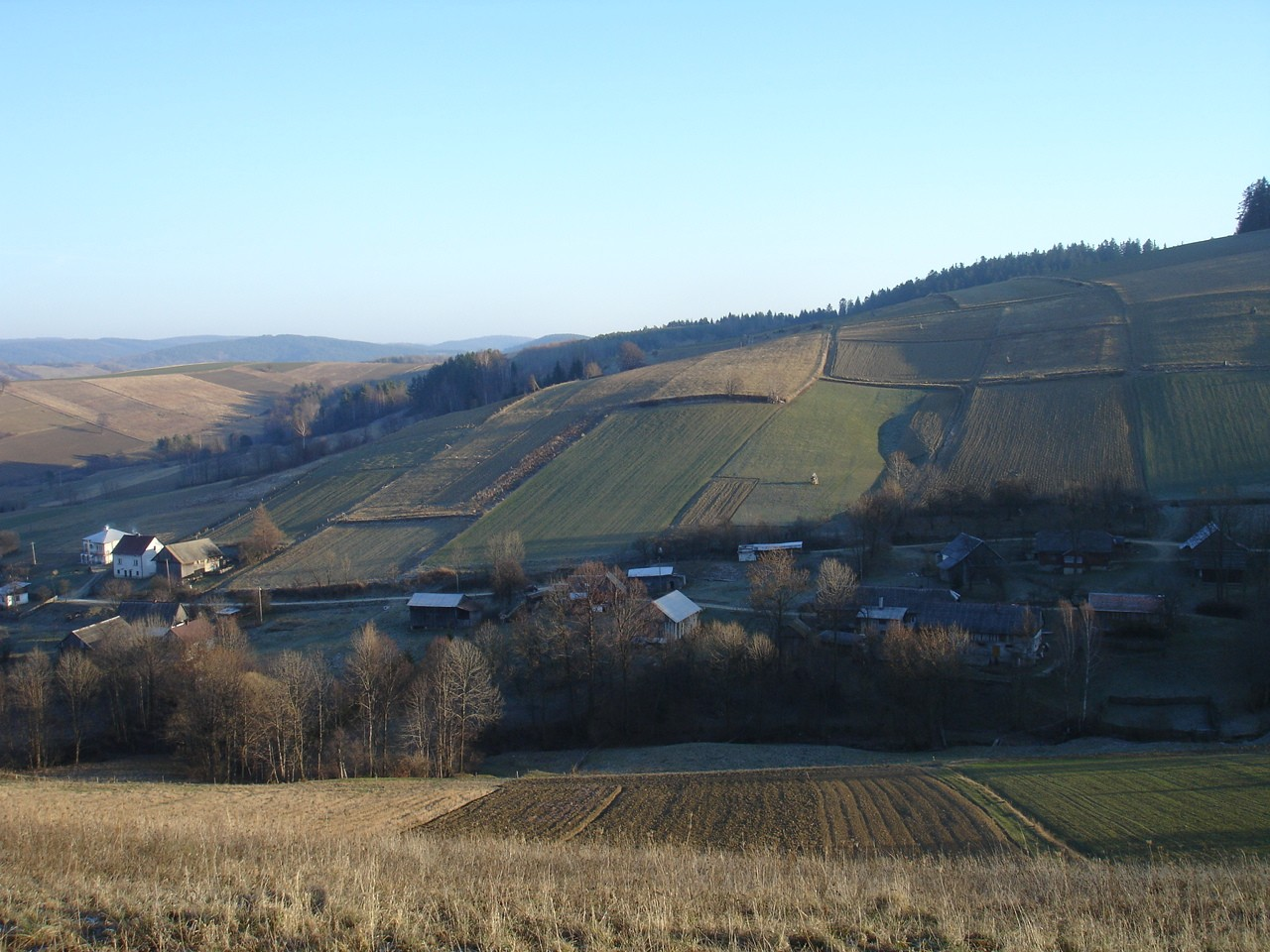
