= Gmina Zarszyn =

Gmina Zarszyn Zarszyn Commune
- Gmina
- Flag Coat of arms
- Interactive map of Gmina Zarszyn
- Coordinates (Zarszyn): 49°35′N 22°1′E
- Country: Poland
- Voivodeship: Subcarpathian
- County: Sanok
- Seat: Zarszyn

Area
  - Total: 106.15 km^{2} (40.98 sq mi)

Population (2006)
  - Total: 9,225
  - Density: 86.91/km^{2} (225.1/sq mi)
- Website: http://www.zarszyn.pl/

Gmina Zarszyn is a rural gmina (administrative district) in Sanok County, Subcarpathian Voivodeship, in south-eastern Poland. Its seat is the village of Zarszyn, which lies approximately 15 kilometres (9 mi) west of Sanok and 50 km (31 mi) south of the regional capital Rzeszów.

The gmina covers an area of 105.96 square kilometres (40.9 sq mi), and as of 2006 its total population is 9,225.

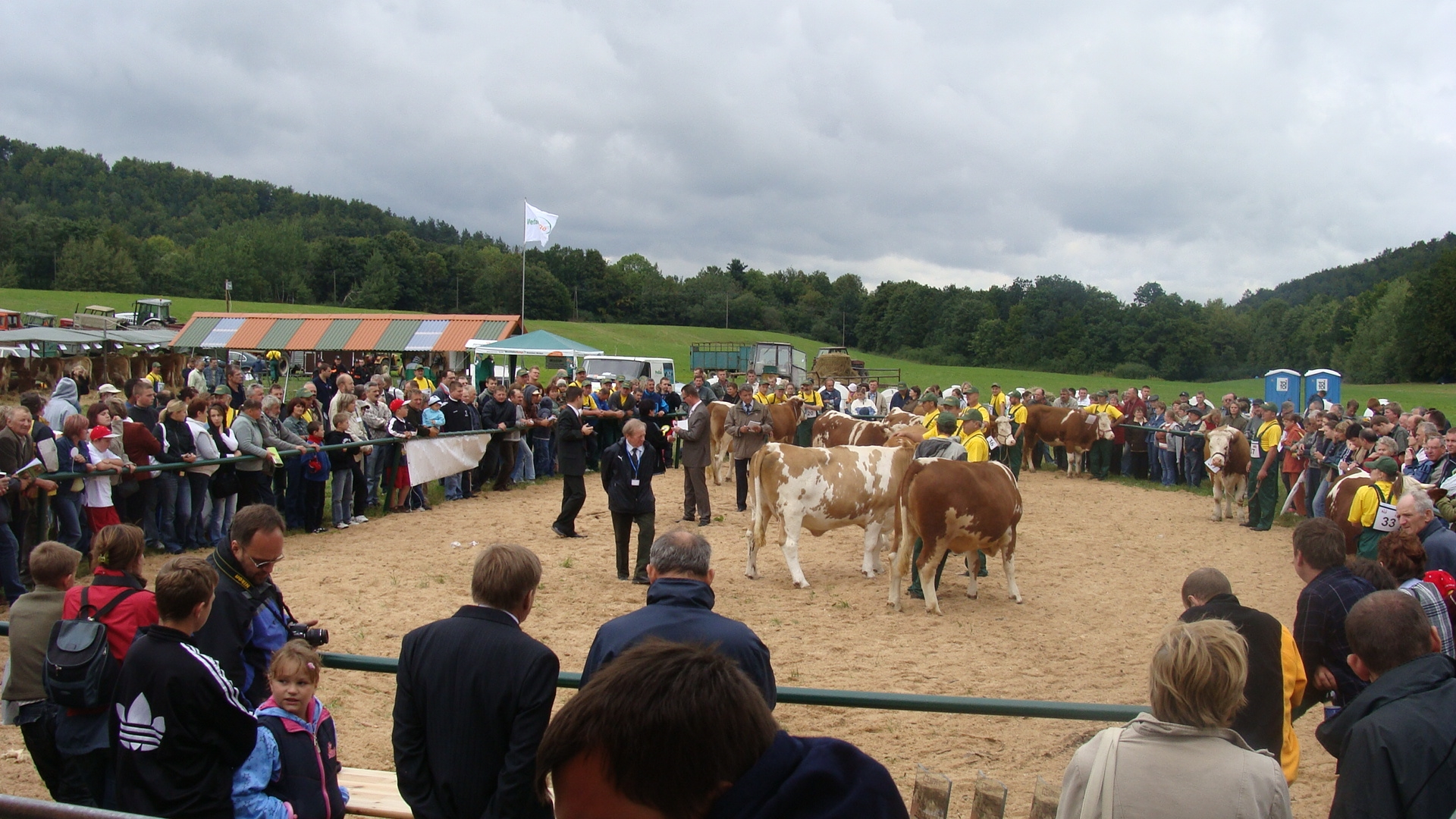
National Exposition of the Simmental Cattle and the Regional Championship of Hucul Horse. Odrzechowa Experimental Station of the National Research Institute of Animal Production, which has the largest herd of Simmental cattle in Poland.

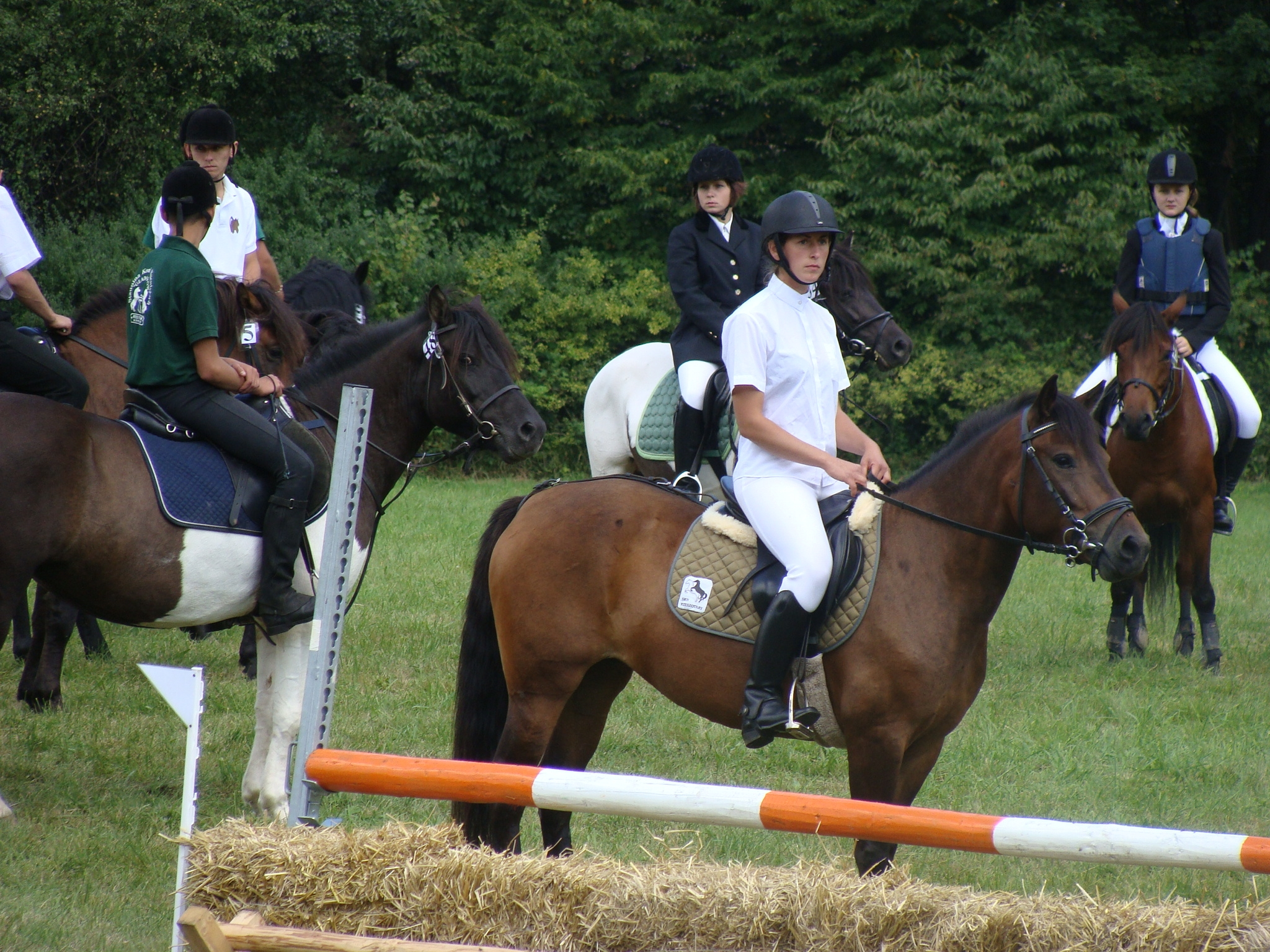
National Exposition of the Simmental Cattle and the Regional Championship of Hucul Horse. Odrzechowa Experimental Station of the National Research Institute of Animal Production. Rudawka Rymanowska. 2008.08.30

Ethnic Groups

- Poles

== Villages ==
Gmina Zarszyn contains the villages and settlements of Bażanówka, Chmurówka, Długie, Granicznik, Jaćmierz, Koszary, Mroczkówki, Nowosielce, Odrzechowa, Pastwiska, Pielnia, Posada Jaćmierska Górna, Posada Zarszyńska and Zarszyn.

== Neighbouring gminas ==
Gmina Zarszyn is bordered by the gminas of Besko, Brzozów, Bukowsko, Haczów, Rymanów and Sanok.

== Rural landscape picture ==
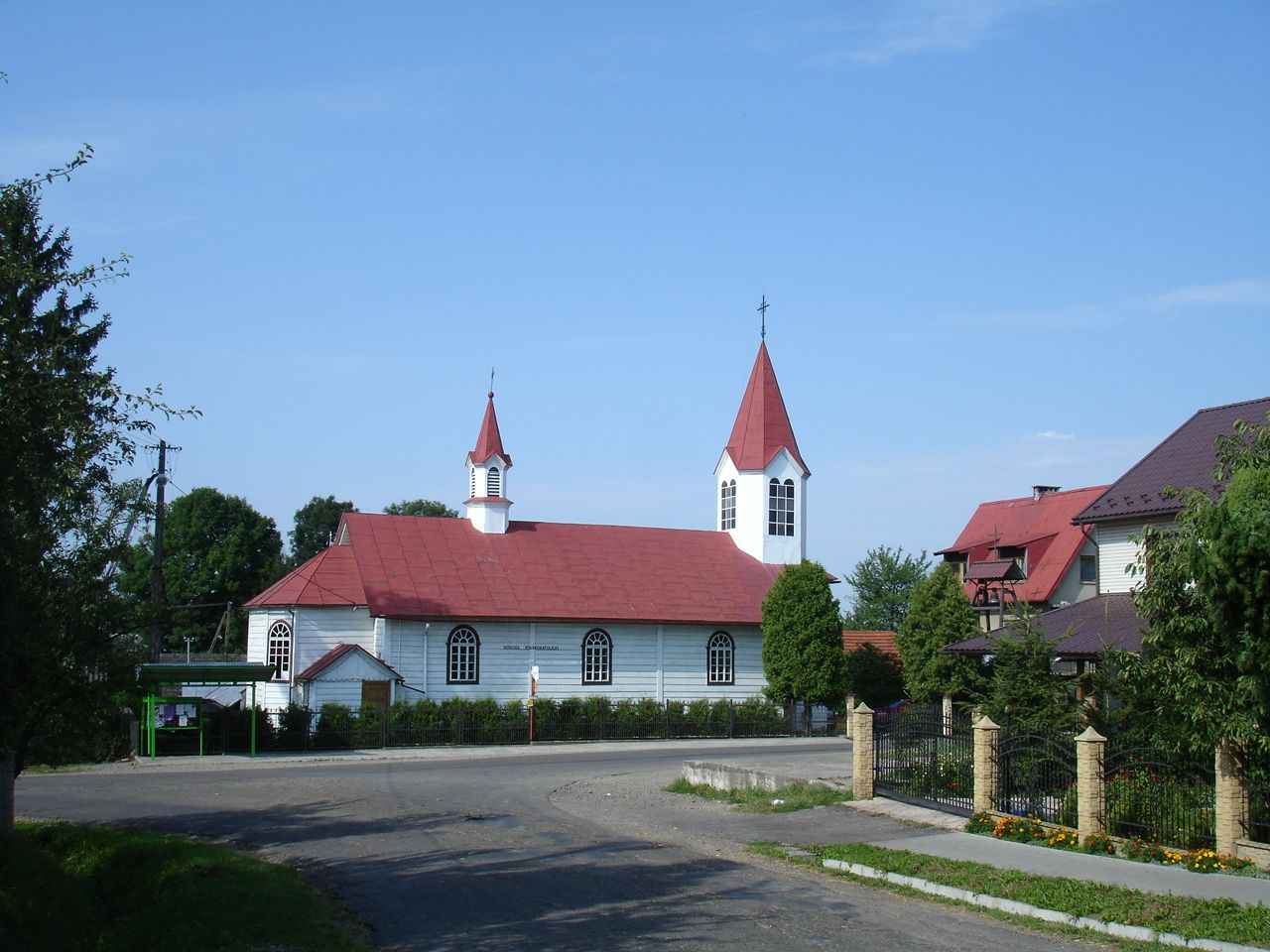

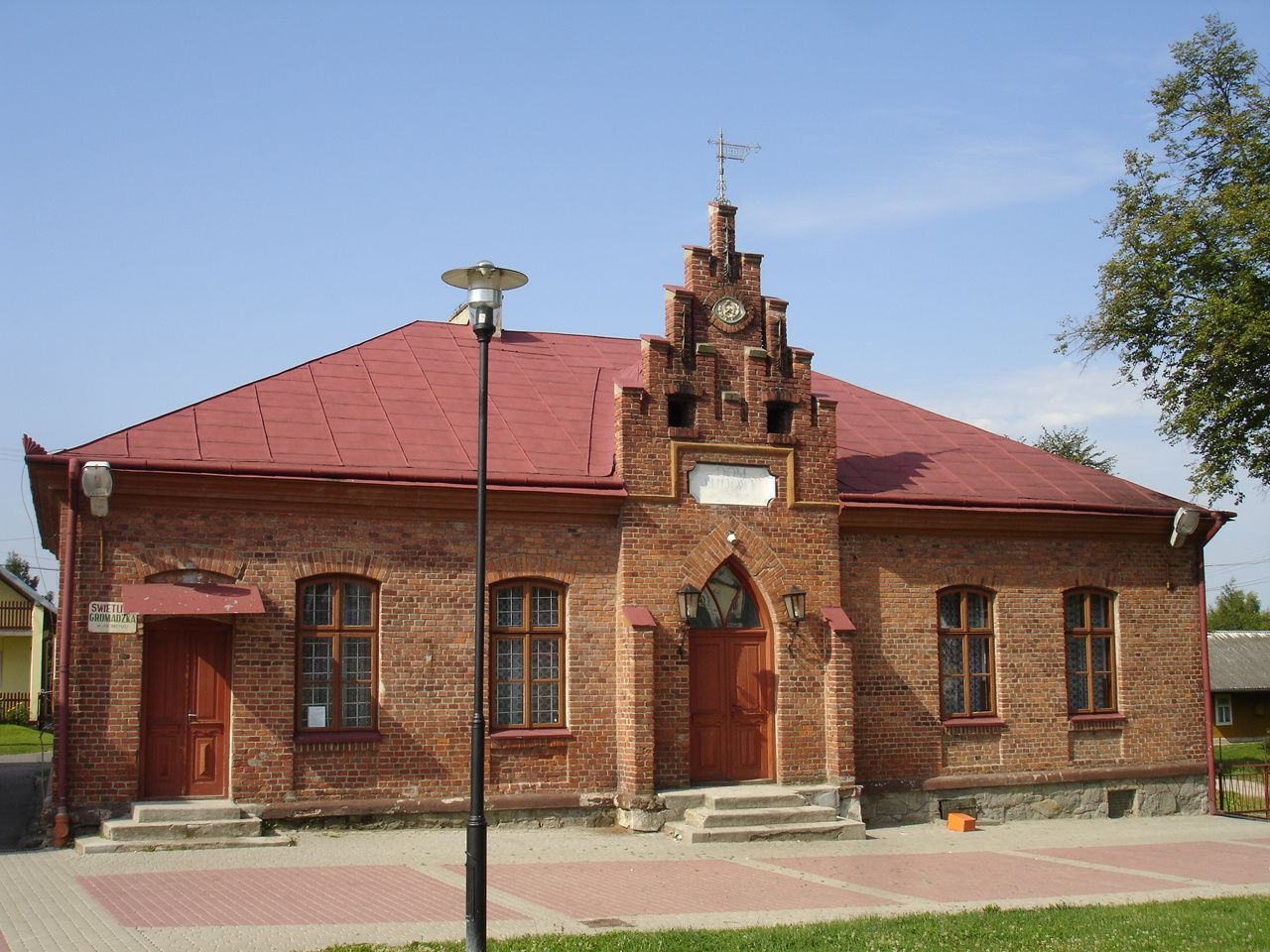

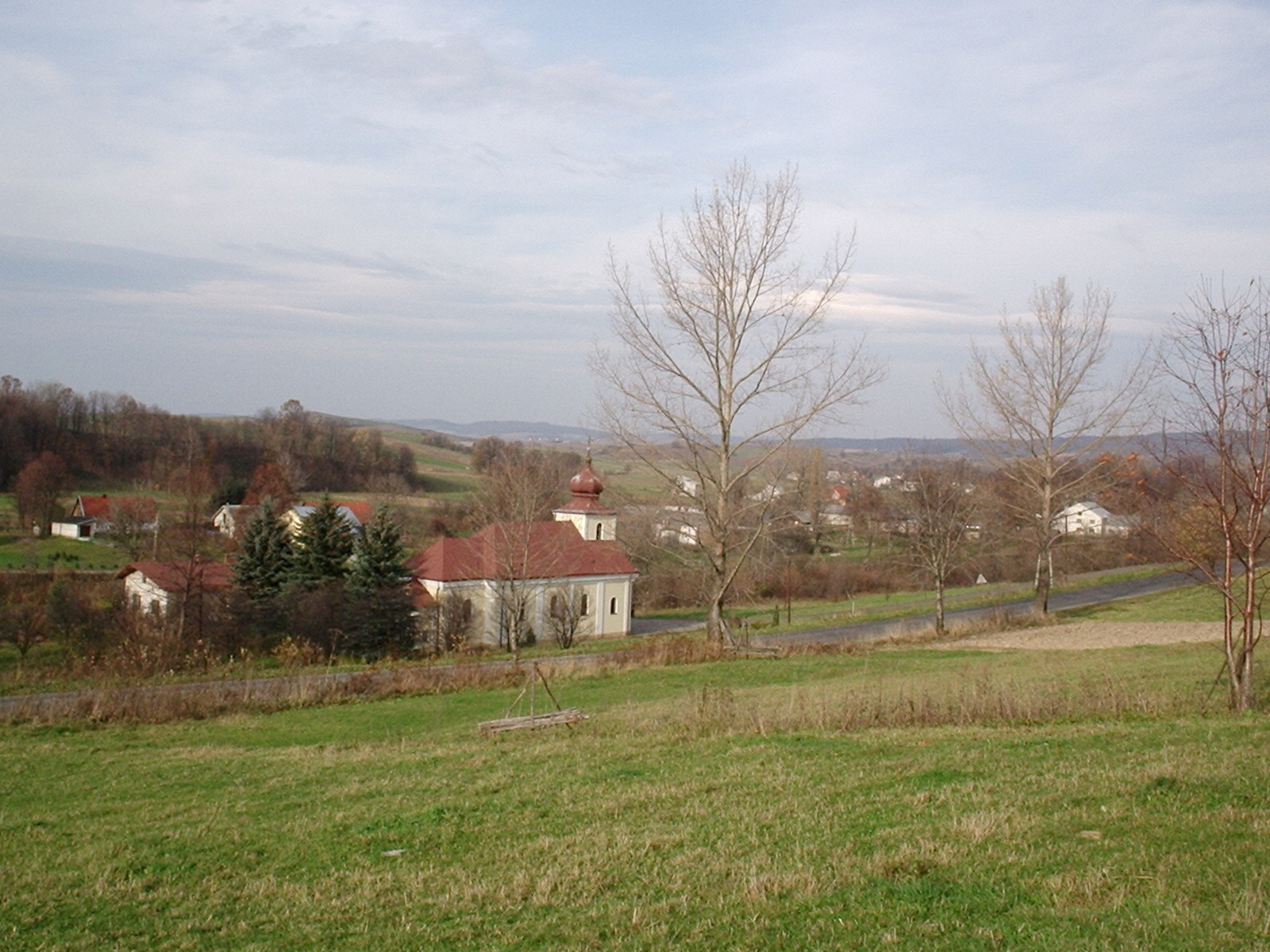

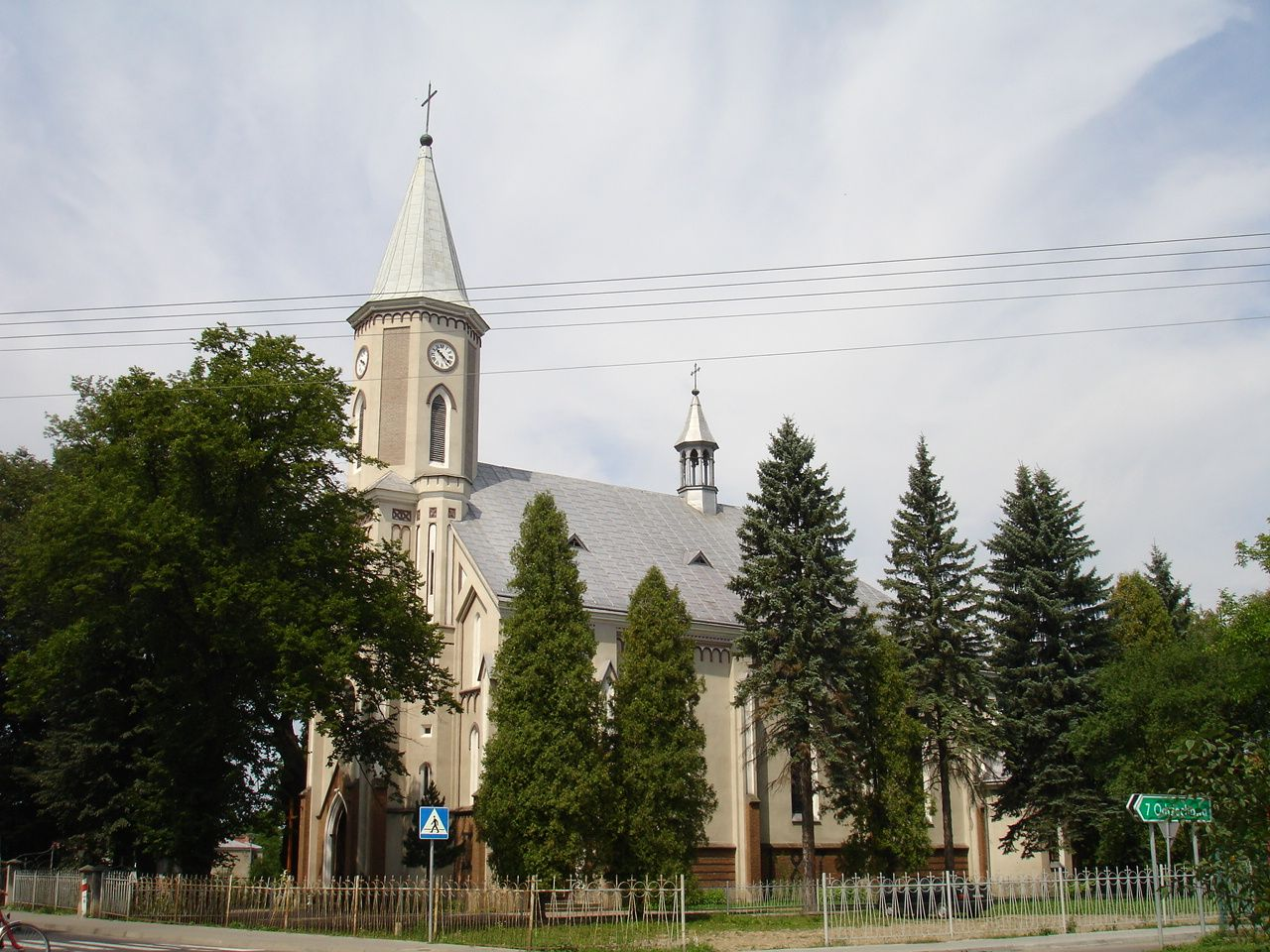
