= Zarszyn =

- Village
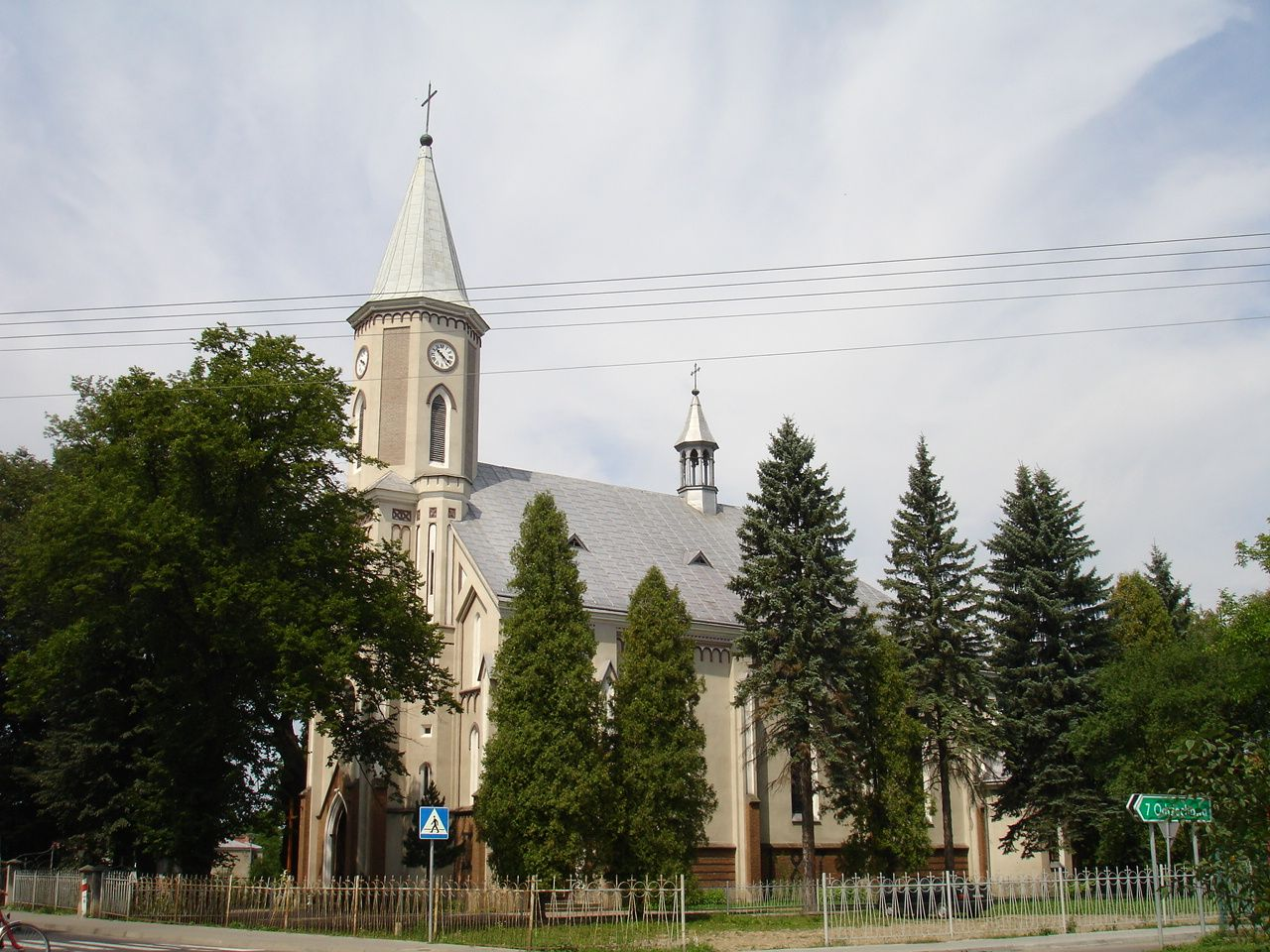
- Church of Saint Martin and Our Lady of the Scapular

- Flag Coat of arms

- Location within Poland
- Coordinates: 49°35′N 22°1′E
- Country: Poland
- Voivodeship: Subcarpathian
- County: Sanok
- Gmina: Zarszyn

Zarszyn [ˈzarʂɨn] is a village in Sanok County, Subcarpathian Voivodeship, in south-eastern Poland. It is the seat of the gmina (administrative district) called Gmina Zarszyn.

== See also ==
- Walddeutsche
