= Sanok County =

Sanok County Powiat sanocki
- County
- Flag Coat of arms

- Location within the voivodeship
- Coordinates (Sanok): 49°33′N 22°13′E
- Country: Poland
- Voivodeship: Subcarpathian
- Seat: Sanok
- Gminas: Total 8 (incl. 1 urban): Sanok; Gmina Besko; Gmina Bukowsko; Gmina Komańcza; Gmina Sanok; Gmina Tyrawa Wołoska; Gmina Zagórz; Gmina Zarszyn

Area
  - Total: 1,225.12 km^{2} (473.02 sq mi)

Population (2019)
  - Total: 94,473
  - Density: 77.113/km^{2} (199.72/sq mi)
  - Urban: 42,476
  - Rural: 51,997
- Car plates: RSA
- Website: www.powiat-sanok.pl

Sanok County (Polish: powiat sanocki) is a unit of territorial administration and local government (powiat) in Subcarpathian Voivodeship, south-eastern Poland, on the Slovak border. It came into being on January 1, 1999, as a result of the Polish local government reforms passed in 1998. Its administrative seat and largest town is Sanok, which lies 56 kilometres (35 mi) south of the regional capital Rzeszów. The only other town in the county is Zagórz, lying 6 km (4 mi) south-east of Sanok.

The county covers an area of 1,225.12 square kilometres (473.0 sq mi). As of 2019 its total population is 94,473, out of which the population of Sanok is 37,381, that of Zagórz is 5,095, and the rural population is 51,997.

== Neighbouring counties ==
Sanok County is bordered by Krosno County to the west, Brzozów County to the north, Przemyśl County to the north-east and Lesko County to the east. It also borders Slovakia to the south.

== Administrative divisions ==
The county is subdivided into eight gminas (one urban, one urban-rural and six rural). These are listed in the following table, in descending order of population.

Gmina	Type	Area (km^{2})	Population (2019)	Seat
Sanok	urban	39.1	37,381	
Gmina Sanok	rural	231.4	18,053	Sanok *
Gmina Zagórz	urban-rural	161.5	13,121	Zagórz
Gmina Zarszyn	rural	106.0	9,294	Zarszyn
Gmina Bukowsko	rural	136.9	5,531	Bukowsko
Gmina Komańcza	rural	388.0	4,603	Komańcza
Gmina Besko	rural	27.5	4,505	Besko
Gmina Tyrawa Wołoska	rural	69.3	1,985	Tyrawa Wołoska
* seat not part of the gmina

== Food ==
About 60% of the land surface of County is given over to agricultural use. However, very little of this is arable land; the vast majority consists of permanent grass pasture or rough grazing for herd animals such as sheep and cows. Although both beef and dairy cattle are raised widely, especially in Odrzechowa, the county is more well known for its sheep farming, and thus lamb is the meat traditionally associated with its cuisine.

=== Regional dishes ===
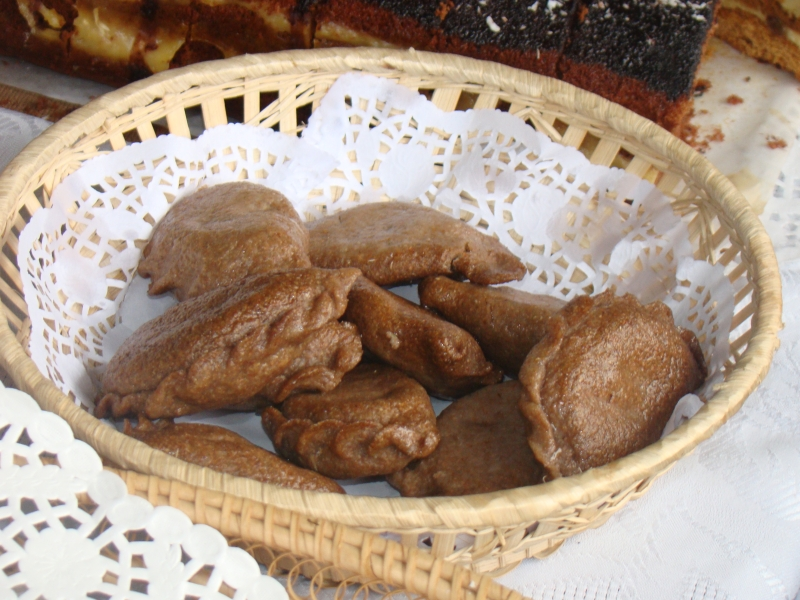
Whole Wheat Pierogi

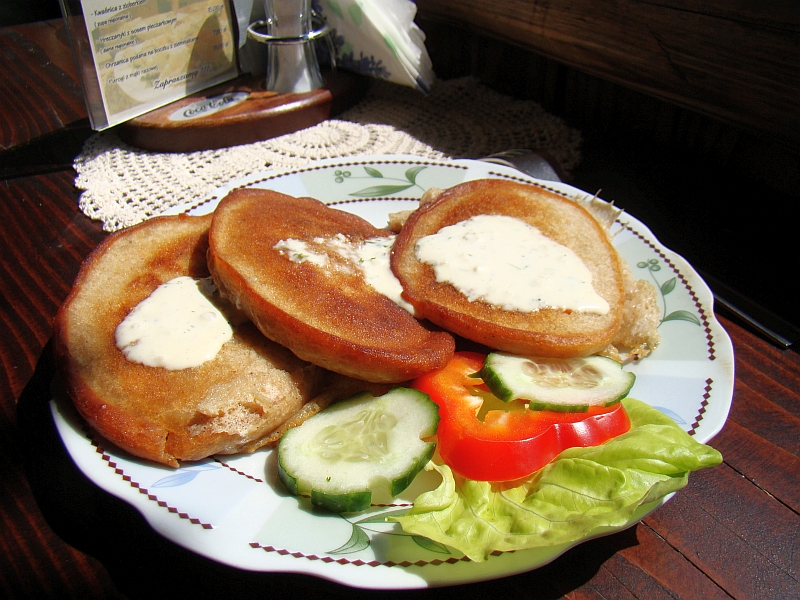
Buckwheat pancakes with yogurt sauce

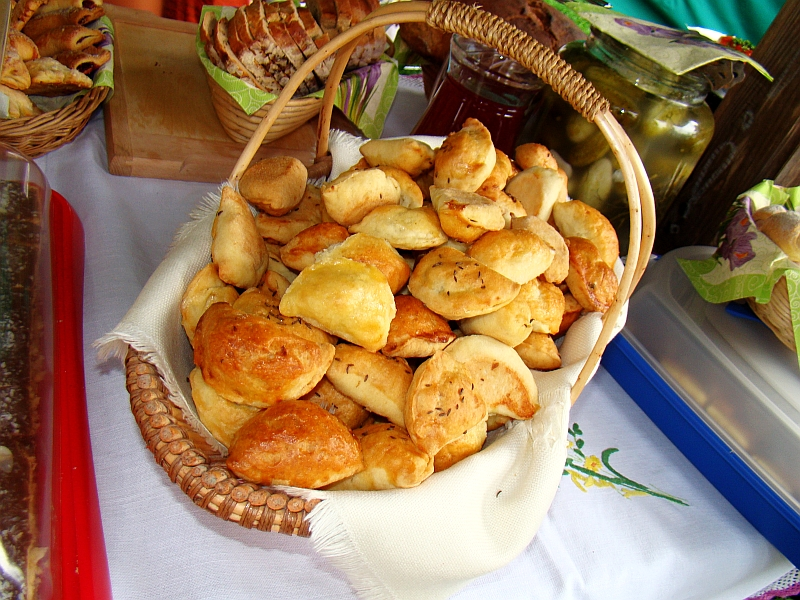
Fried cabbage dumplings with caraway lemberger Art (pierogi ruskie)

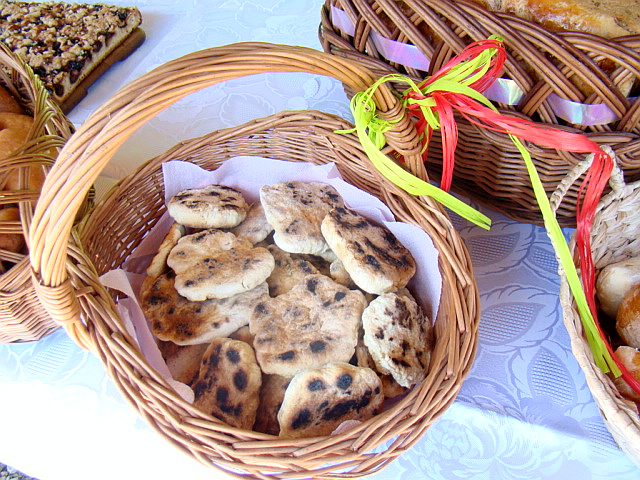
Polish flat soda breads a.k.a. proziaki

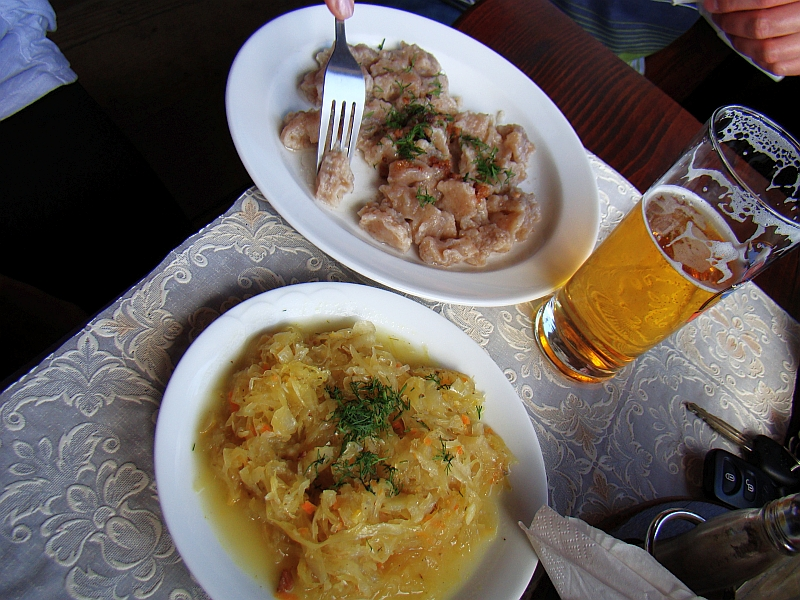
Dumplings with sauerkraut

== Literature ==
- Prof. Adam Fastnacht. Slownik Historyczno-Geograficzny Ziemi Sanockiej w Średniowieczu (Historic-Geographic Dictionary of the Sanok District in the Middle Ages), Kraków, 2002, ISBN 83-88385-14-3.

== Rural landscape pictures ==
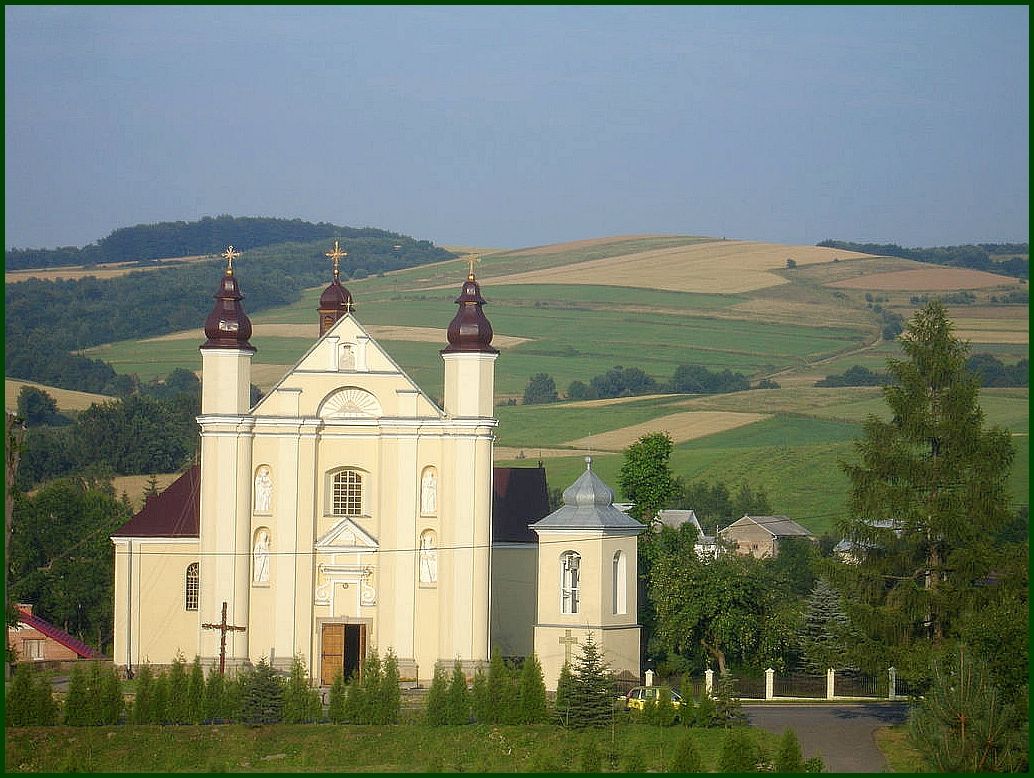

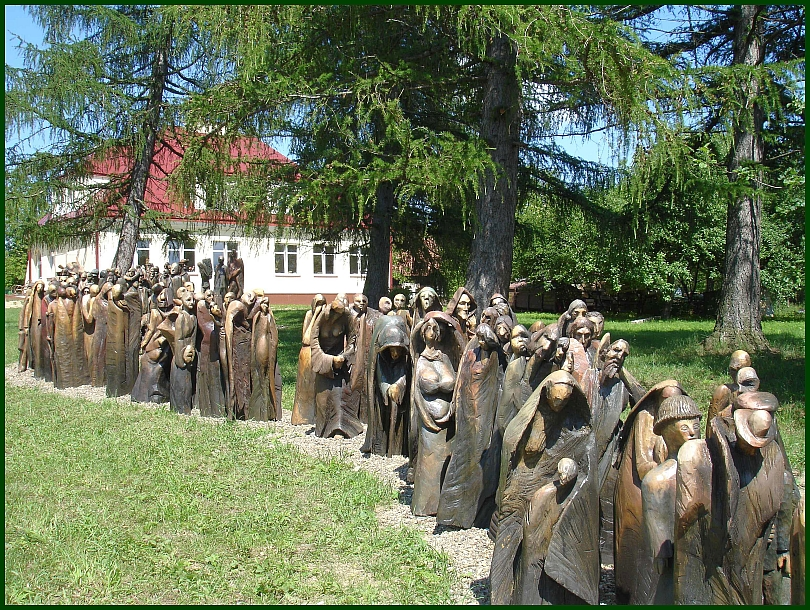

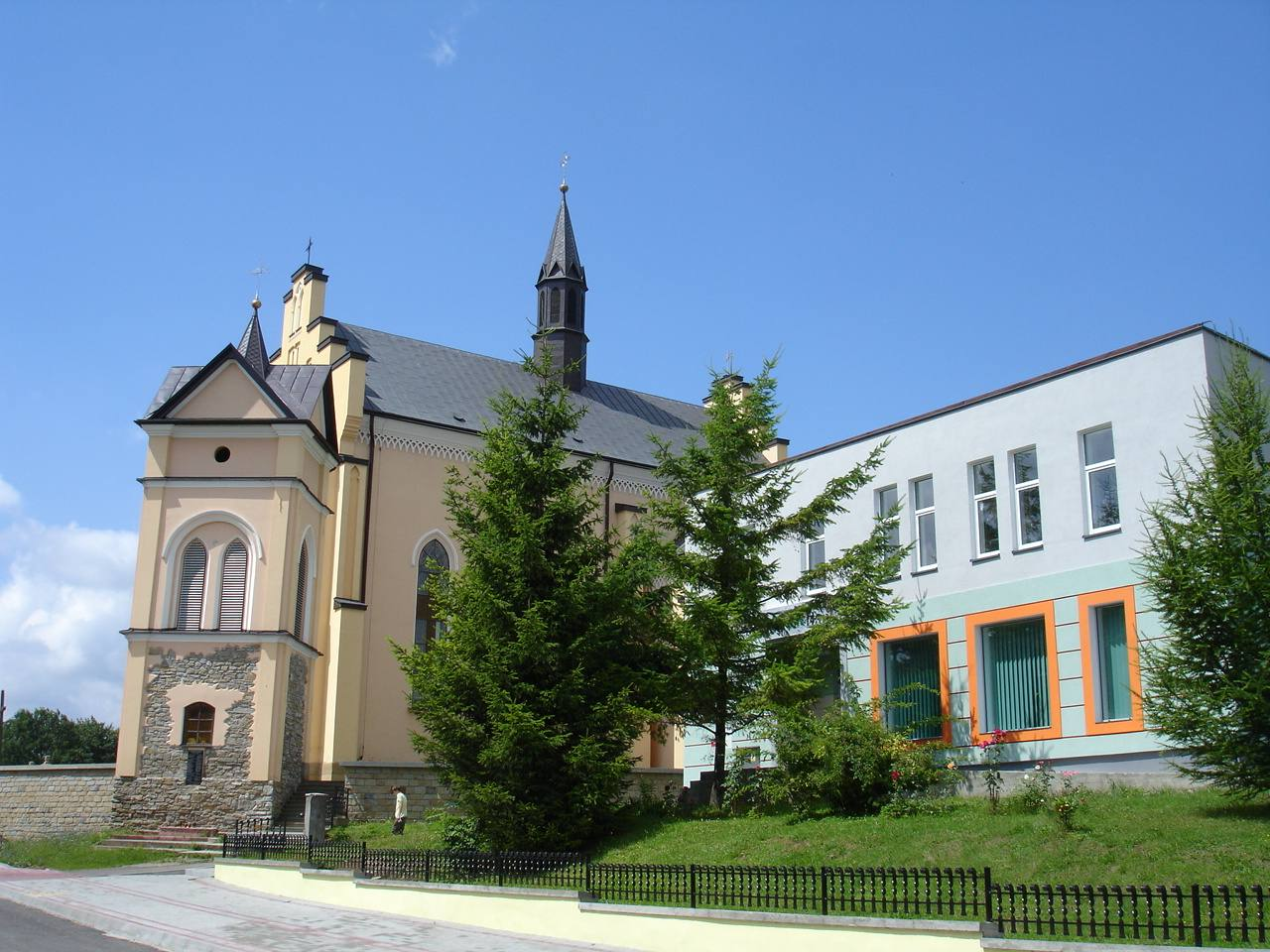

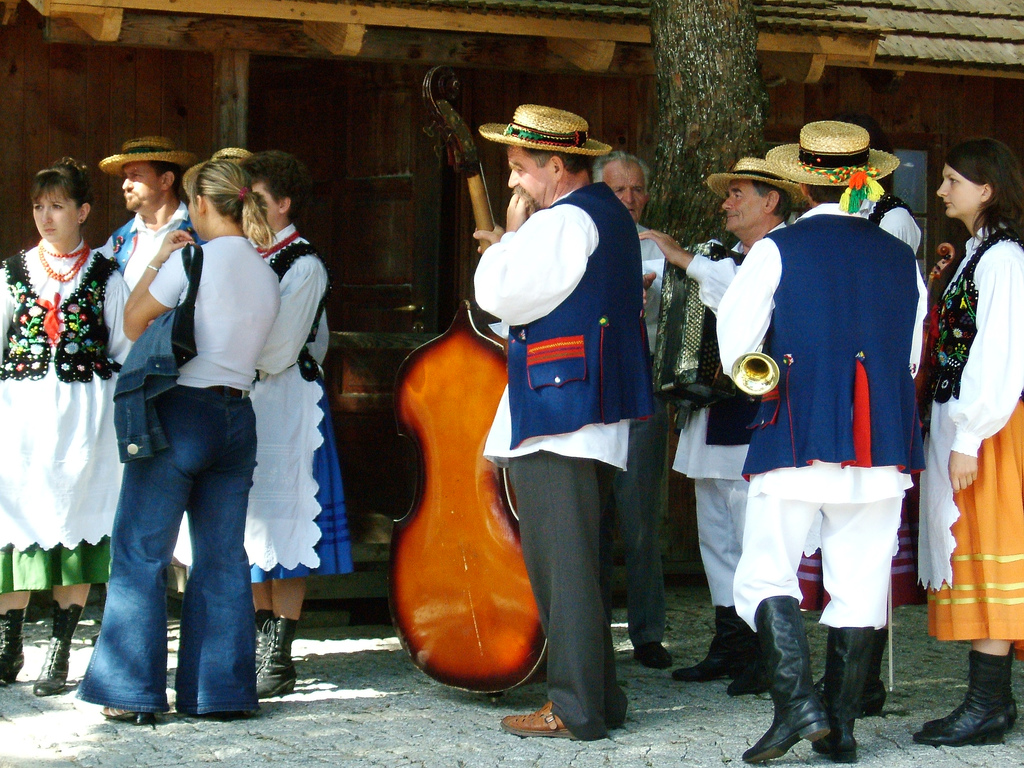

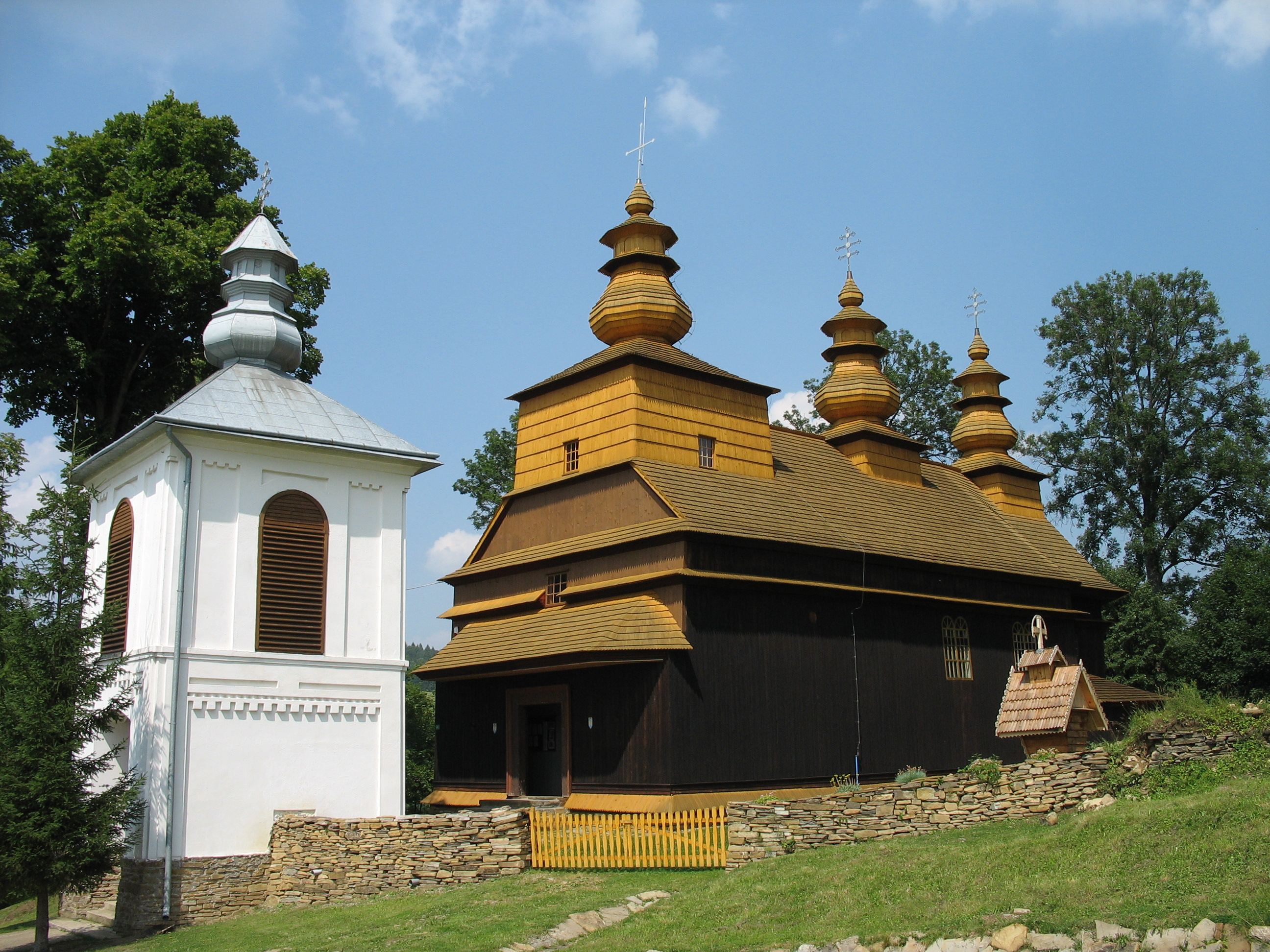

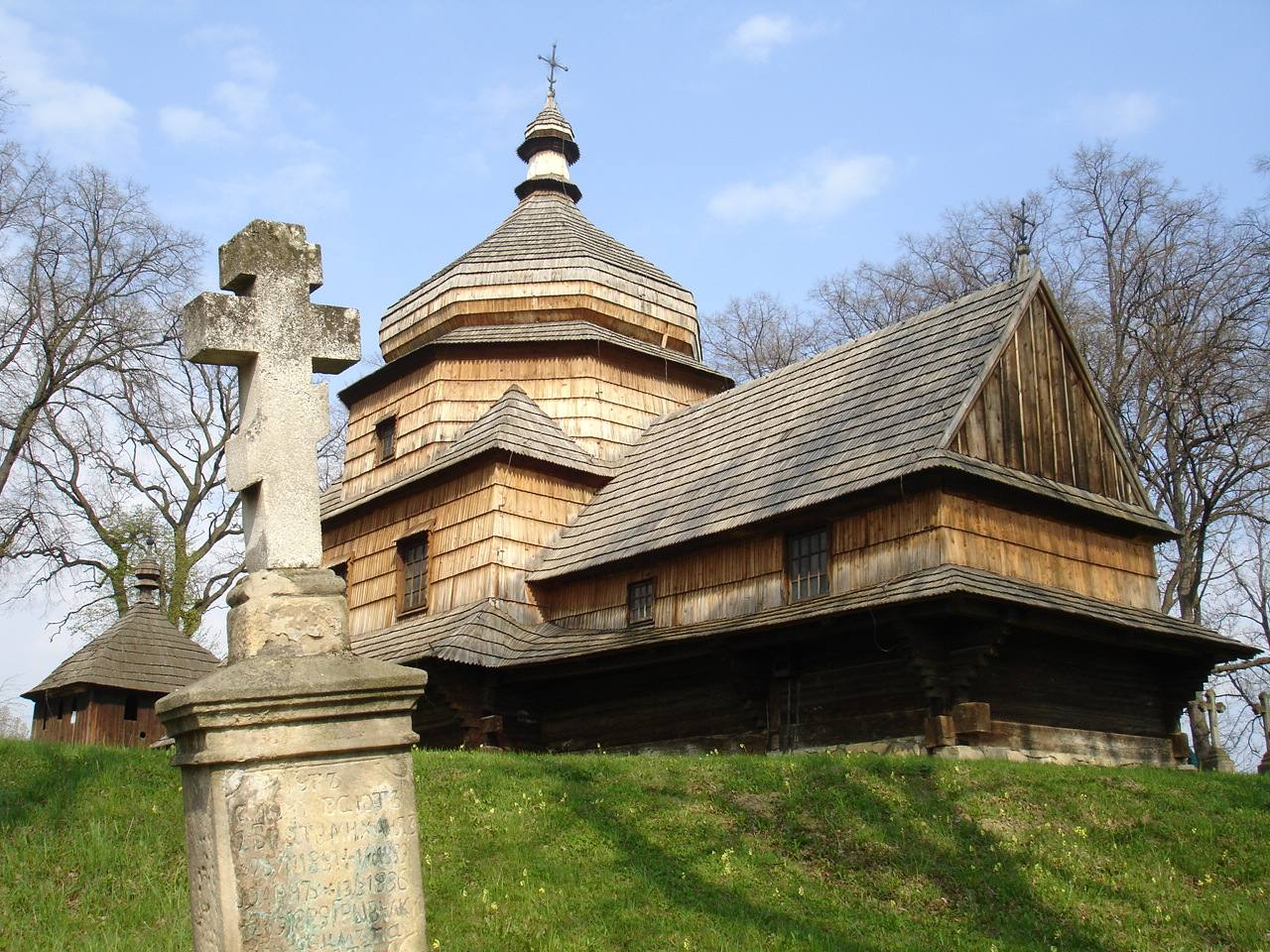

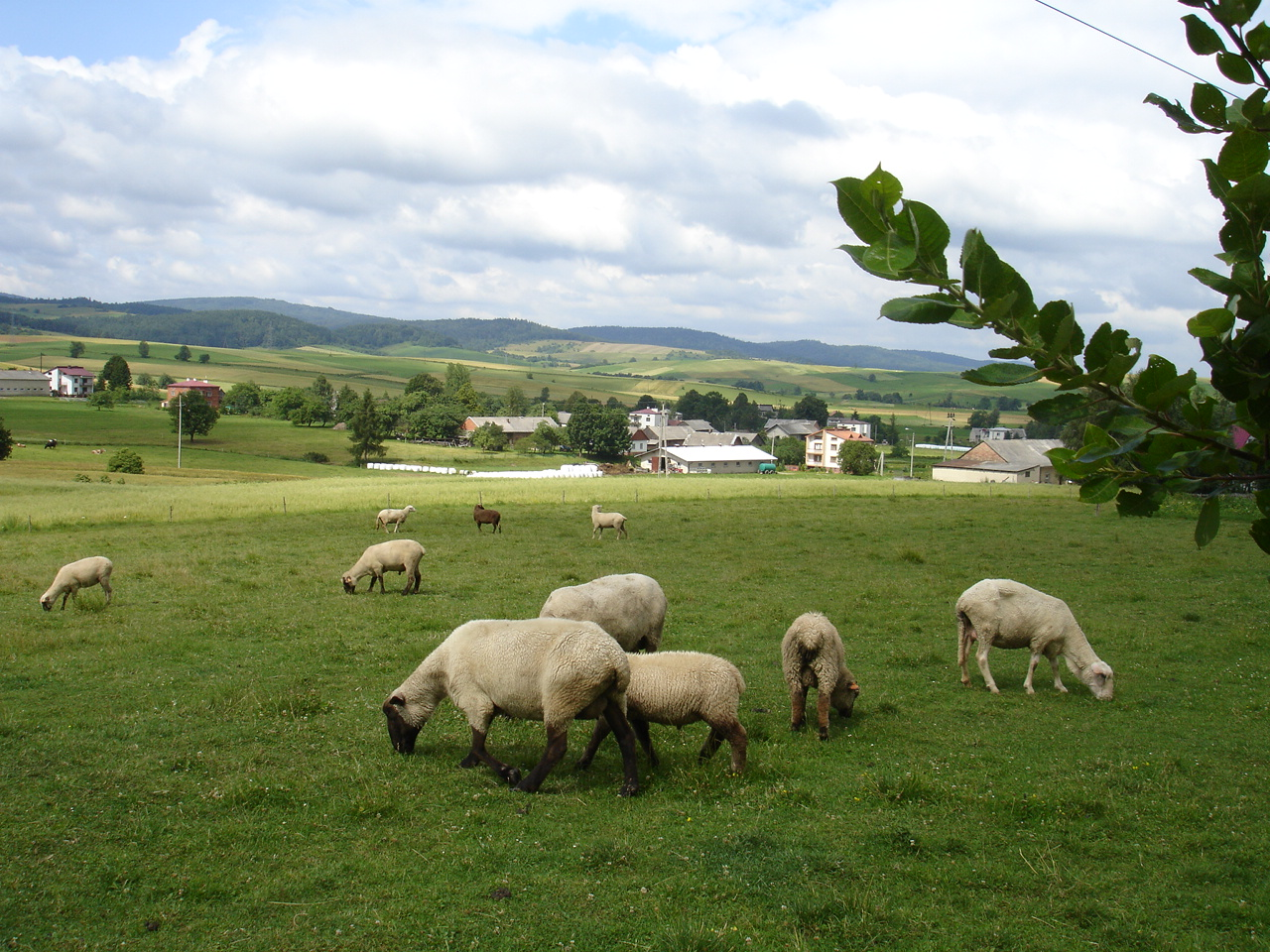

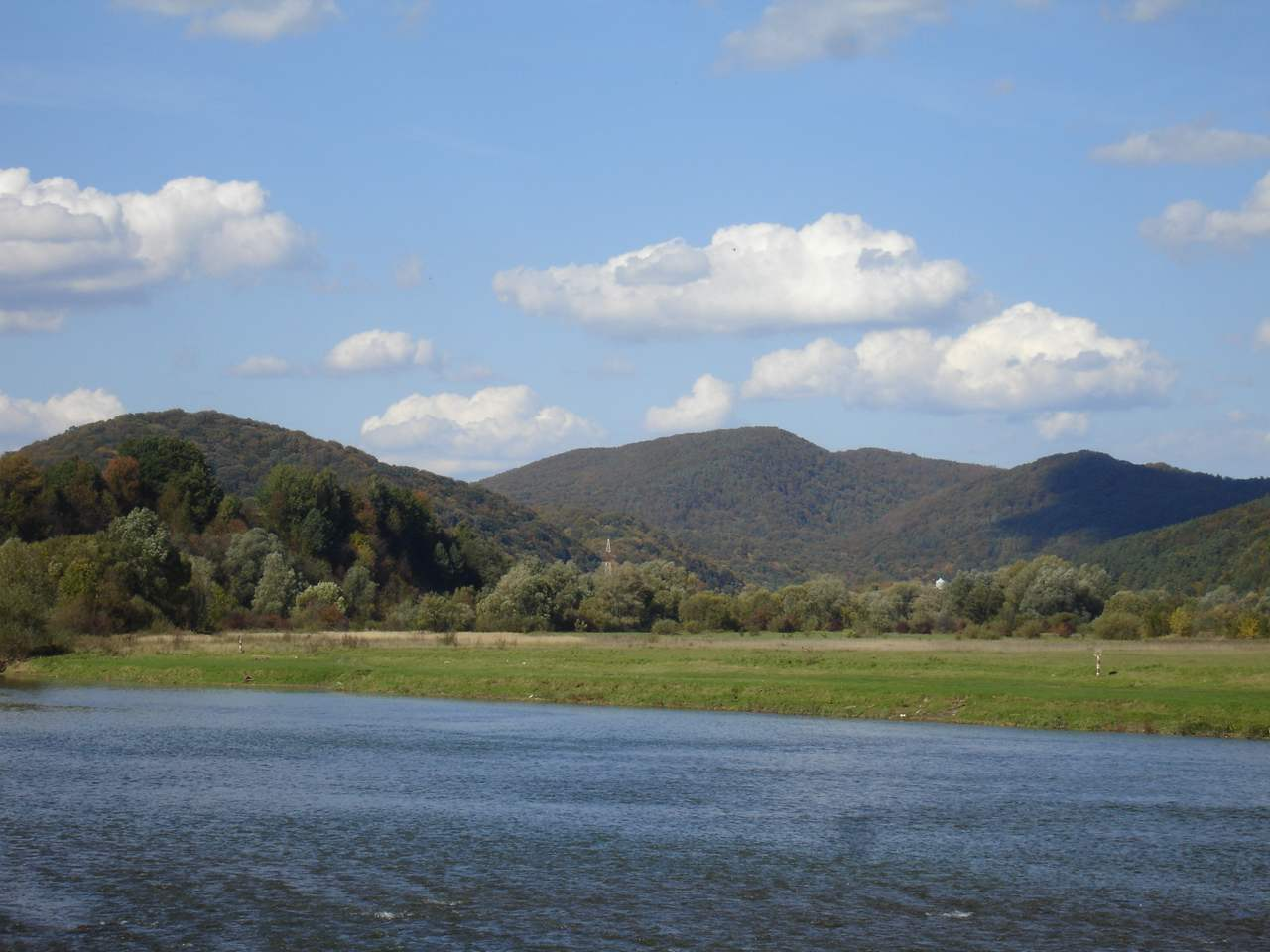

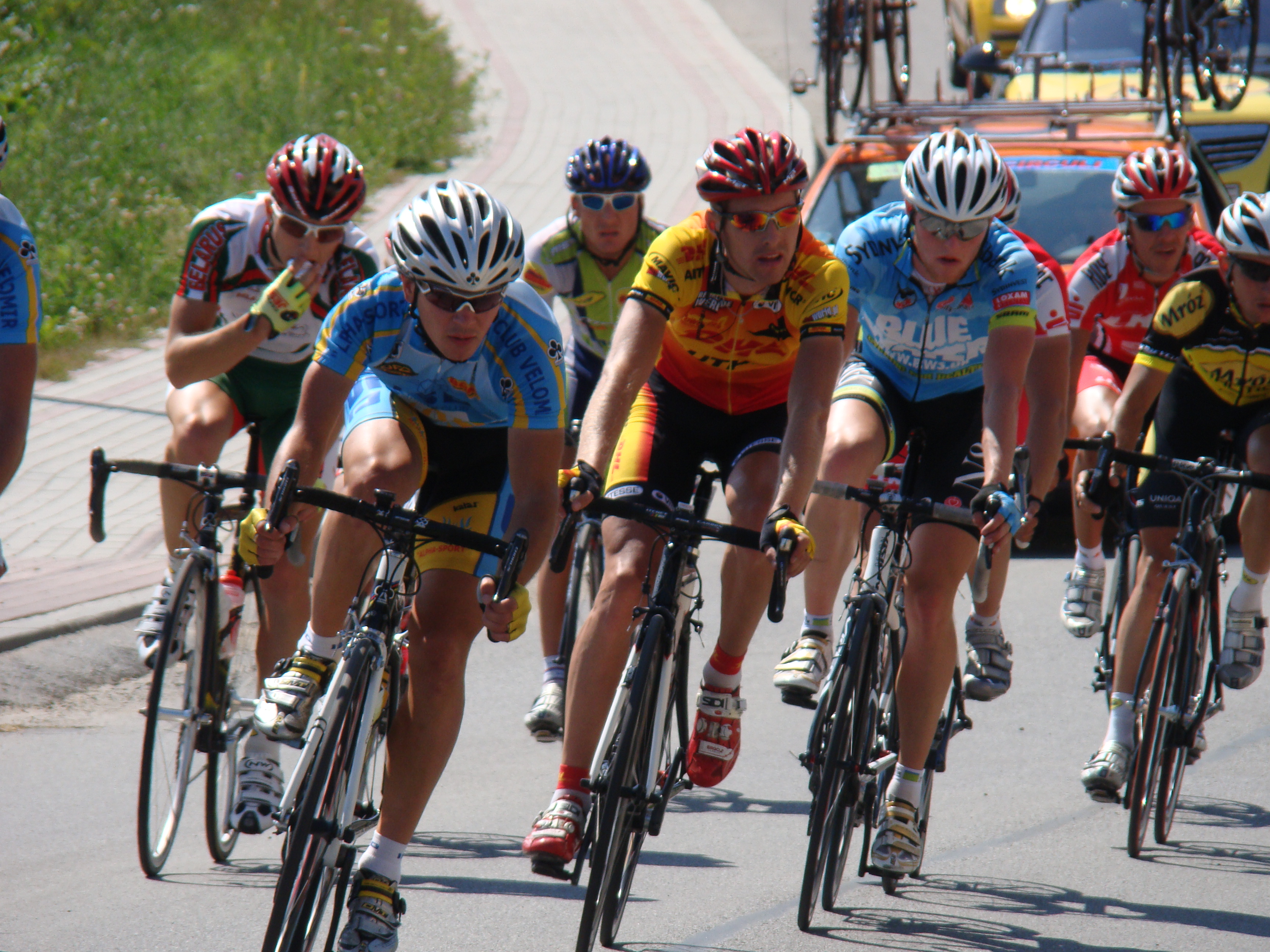

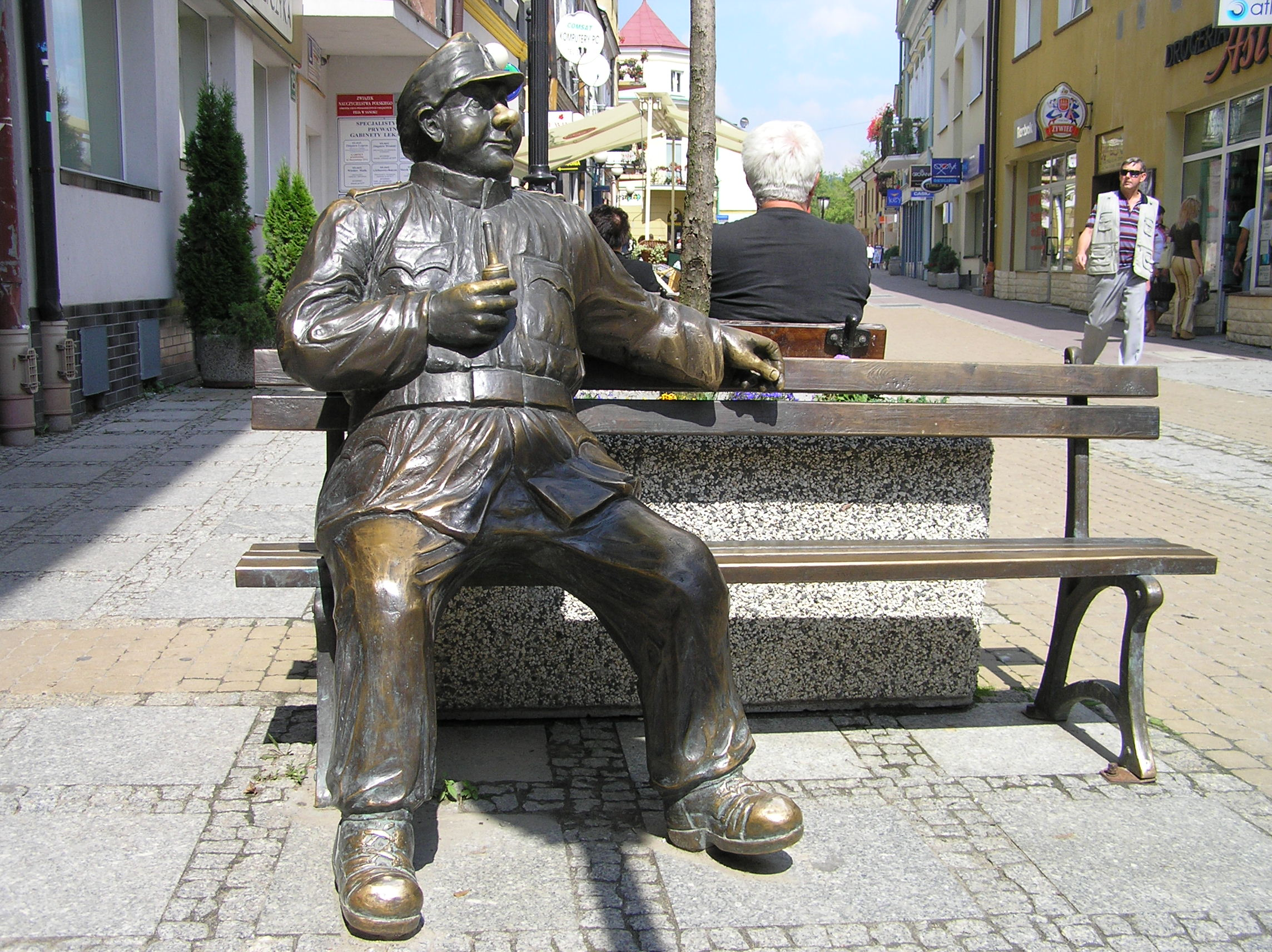

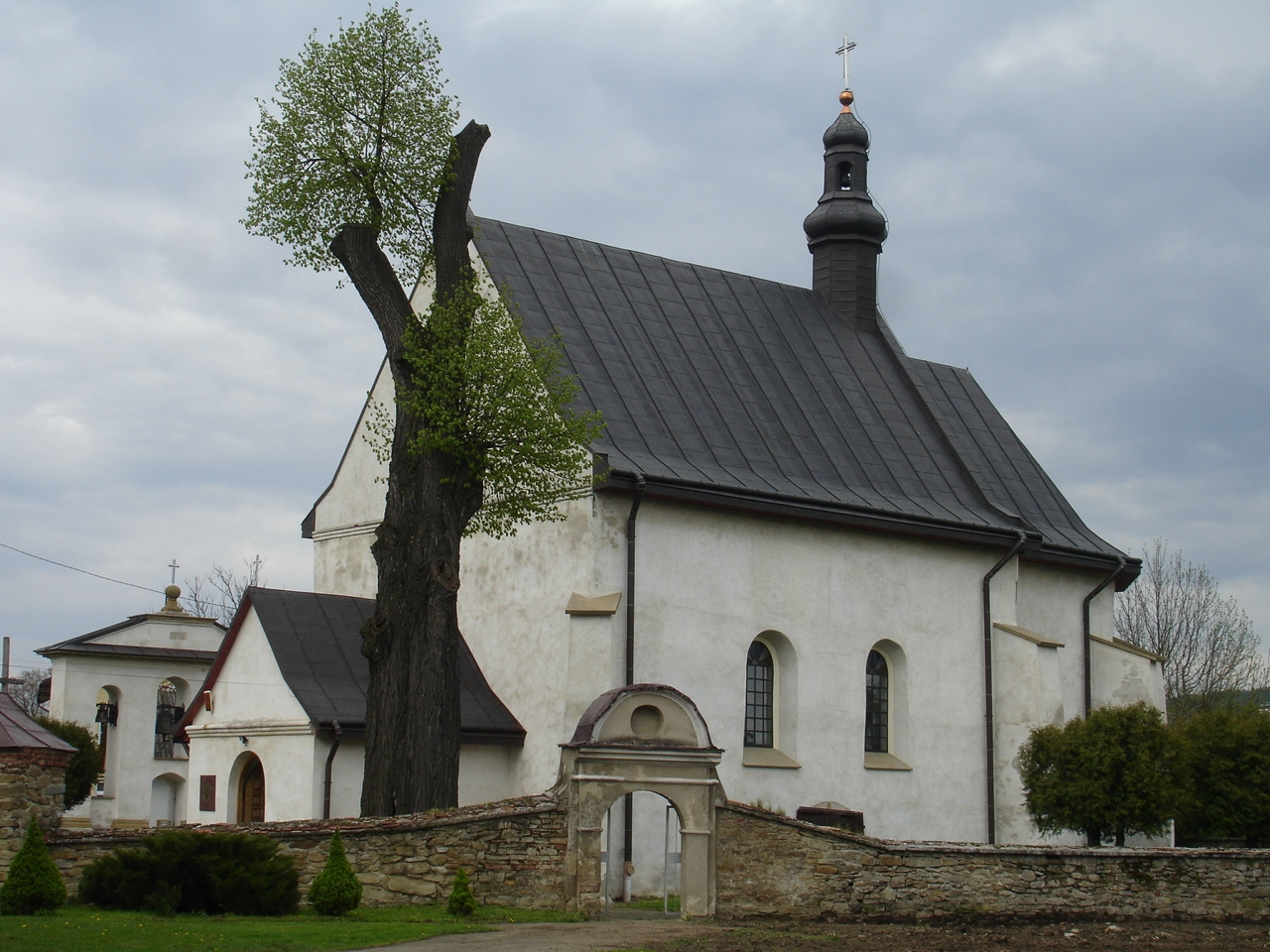

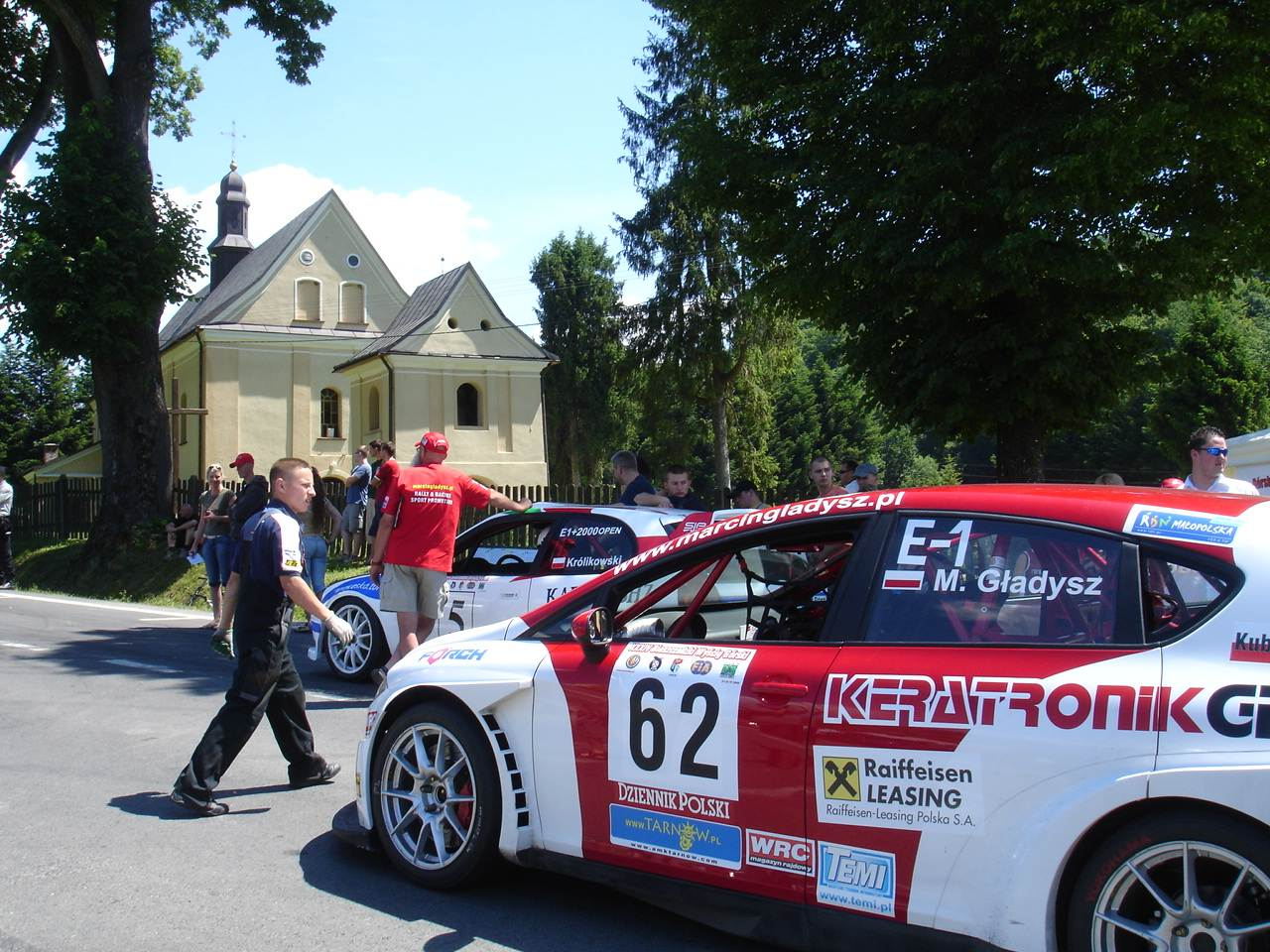
