= Nagórzany =

Nagórzany Nagórzany
- village
- Location within Poland
- Coordinates: 49°30′08″N 22°02′02″E
- Country: Poland
- Voivodeship: Subcarpathian
- County: Sanok
- Gmina: Bukowsko
- Founded: 1446

Area
  - Total: 8.8 km^{2} (3.4 sq mi)
- Elevation: 250 m (820 ft)

Population
  - Total: 300
- Time zone: UTC+1 (CET)
  - Summer (DST): UTC+2 (CEST)
- Postal code: 38507

Nagórzany [naɡuˈʐanɨ] is a village in East Małopolska in the Lesser Beskid mountains, Bukowsko rural commune, parish in Nowotaniec.

Nagórzany is situated below the main watershed at the foot of the Słonne Mountain, and has an elevation of 340 metres. Situated in the Subcarpathian Voivodship (since 1999), previously in Krosno Voivodship (1975–1998) and Sanok district, located near the towns of Medzilaborce and Palota (in northeastern Slovakia).

== History ==
Nagórzany with Lipniki, Ludwikówka and Węglarzyska, village, Sanok district, in a hilly area 390 m. above sea level, on the divide between the Pielnica (tributary of Wisłok) and Sanoczek (tributary of the San River). Forming sort of a suburb of Nowotaniec, it carries a name in contrast to that of Nadolany, lying to the north of the town. Its population in 1880 was 446 people, ecclesiastical sematisms indicate 927 RC belonging to the Nowotaniec parish and 55 GC in the Wola Sękowa parish. The adornment of the village is the masonry cerkiew p.t. Apostles Peter and Paul, to which belong 16 mórgs of fields and 16 morgs of grubbing for fuel. Nagorzany borders with Jaworowa Wola and Bukowsko to the south. Nagórzany was founded in 1446 by Bals family.

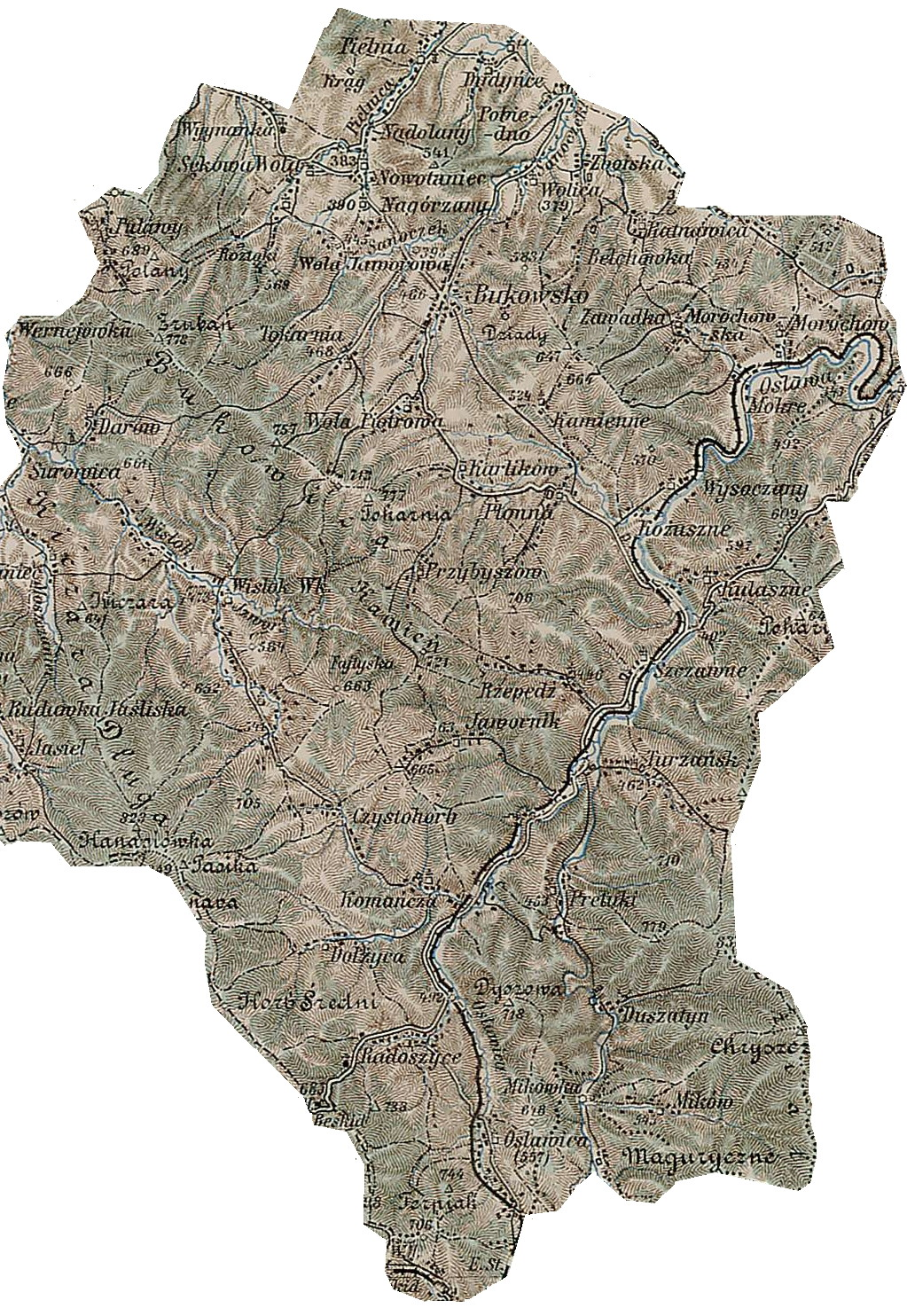
Gerichts-Bezirk ( Bukowsko Rural Commune) Bukowsko bis 1918. An 1898 map shows the location of Nagórzany (click in it to enlarge)

This part of Poland was controlled by Austria for almost 120 years. At that time the area (including west and east of Subcarpathian Voivodship) was known as Galicia. In 1785 the village lands comprised 6 1/2 lan. There were 50 Greek Catholics, 267 Roman Catholics and 5 Jews. In 1899 the village lands comprised 343 km^{2} (132 sq mi). There were 49 Greek Catholics, 431 Roman Catholics, and 10 Jews. The church at Nagórzany is right on the road an easy to get to. Church was "Saint Michael" 1848 - Apostles Saints Peter & Paul". The name was changed from Saint Michael in 1864. The cemetery has a few headstones in it. In April 1946 the village was attacked by a strong unit of UPA and some buildings were burnt. Only over a dozen years after the war the village started to rebuild. At one time the entire village was burned to the ground by the UPA with the exception of two houses belonging to Lemkos. No one was killed but every house was destroyed.

== Literature ==
- Adam Fastnacht, Nagórzany [in:] Slownik Historyczno-Geograficzny Ziemi Sanockiej w Średniowieczu (Historic-Geographic Dictionary of the Sanok District in the Middle Ages), Kraków, (II edition 2002), ISBN 83-88385-14-3.
- Jerzy Zuba "W Gminie Bukowsko". Roksana, 2004, ISBN 83-7343-150-0. Translated by Deborah Greenlee, Arlington, TX.
