= Nowotaniec =

- Village
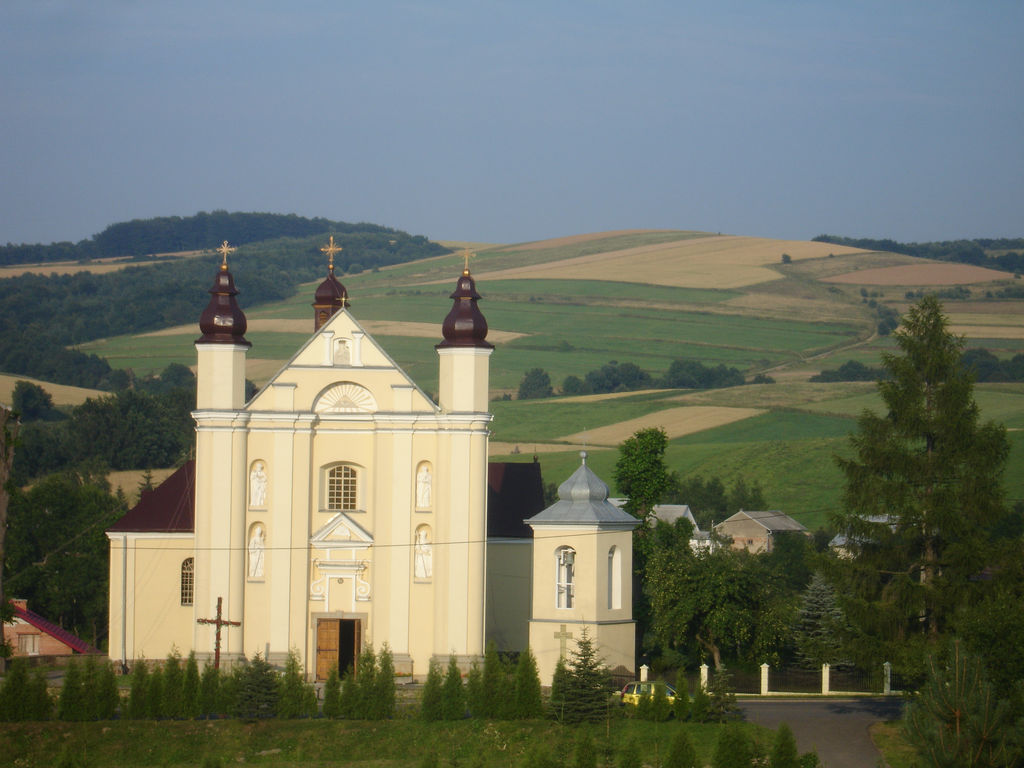
- Main street in Nowotaniec, the centre of village. The latin church parish and Bukowica hill.

- Coat of arms
- Etymology: new dance,
- Location within Poland
- Coordinates: 49°30′31″N 22°01′47″E
- Country: Poland
- Voivodeship: Subcarpathian
- County: Sanok
- Gmina: Bukowsko
- First mentioned: 1366

Area
  - Total: 6.8 km^{2} (2.6 sq mi)
- Elevation: 270 m (890 ft)

Population (31 December 2002)
  - Total: 430
  - Density: 63/km^{2} (160/sq mi)
- Time zone: UTC+1 (CET)
  - Summer (DST): UTC+2 (CEST)
- Postal code: 38 504
- Car plate: KUS, RSA
- Website: http://www.bukowsko.pl

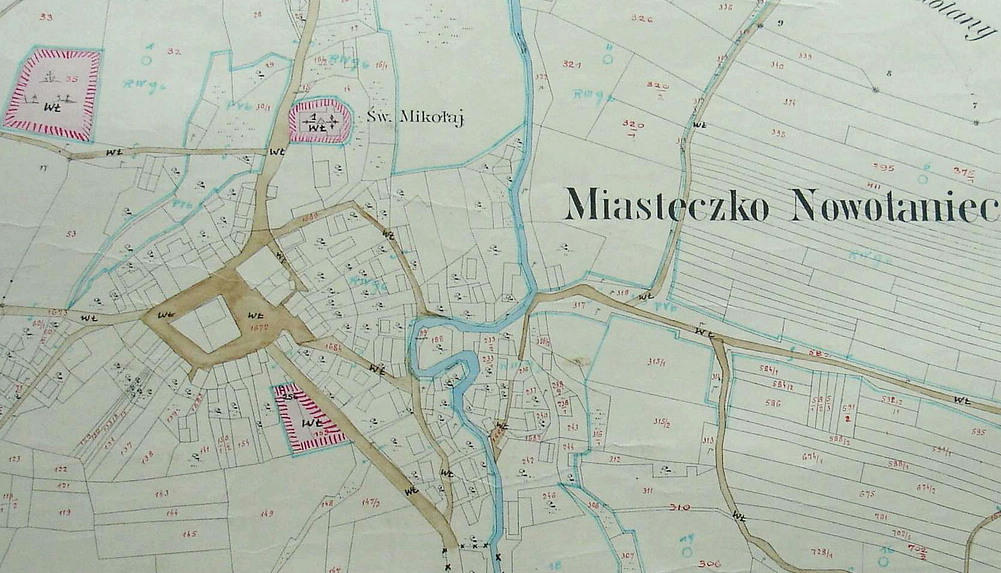
Cadastral map, Miasteczko Nowotaniec, 1852.

Nowotaniec [nɔvɔˈtaɲɛt͡s] is a village in south-eastern Poland, inhabited by about 430 (2002), in the Pogórze Bukowskie (Bukowsko Upland) mountains. Situated in the Subcarpathian Voivodeship (since 1999), previously in the Krosno Voivodeship (1975–1998) and the Sanok district, Bukowsko subdistrict, located near the towns of Medzilaborce and Palota (in northeastern Slovakia).

Nowotaniec is bordered on the east by Bukowsko, on the north by Wola Sękowa, on the west by Nadolany, on the right bank of the Pielnica river (a tributary of the Wisłok), on the left side of the highway nr 889 from the railroad running from Sanok to Krosno, and on the west by forests covering the slopes of the Bukowica Range.

This village consists of one street which runs north to south displaying Latin church stone and several houses.

The parish belongs to the Diocese of Przemyśl, deanery of Sanok. It includes, Nagórzany, Nadolany, and Wola Sękowa. The Roman Catholic cemetery is located 100 m (328 ft) westward of the village center.

== Geography ==
It is located on the river of Pielnica just like the villages of Nadolaly, Nagórzany, Wola Sękowa, Odrzechowa, Pielnia, Długie and Besko.

== History ==
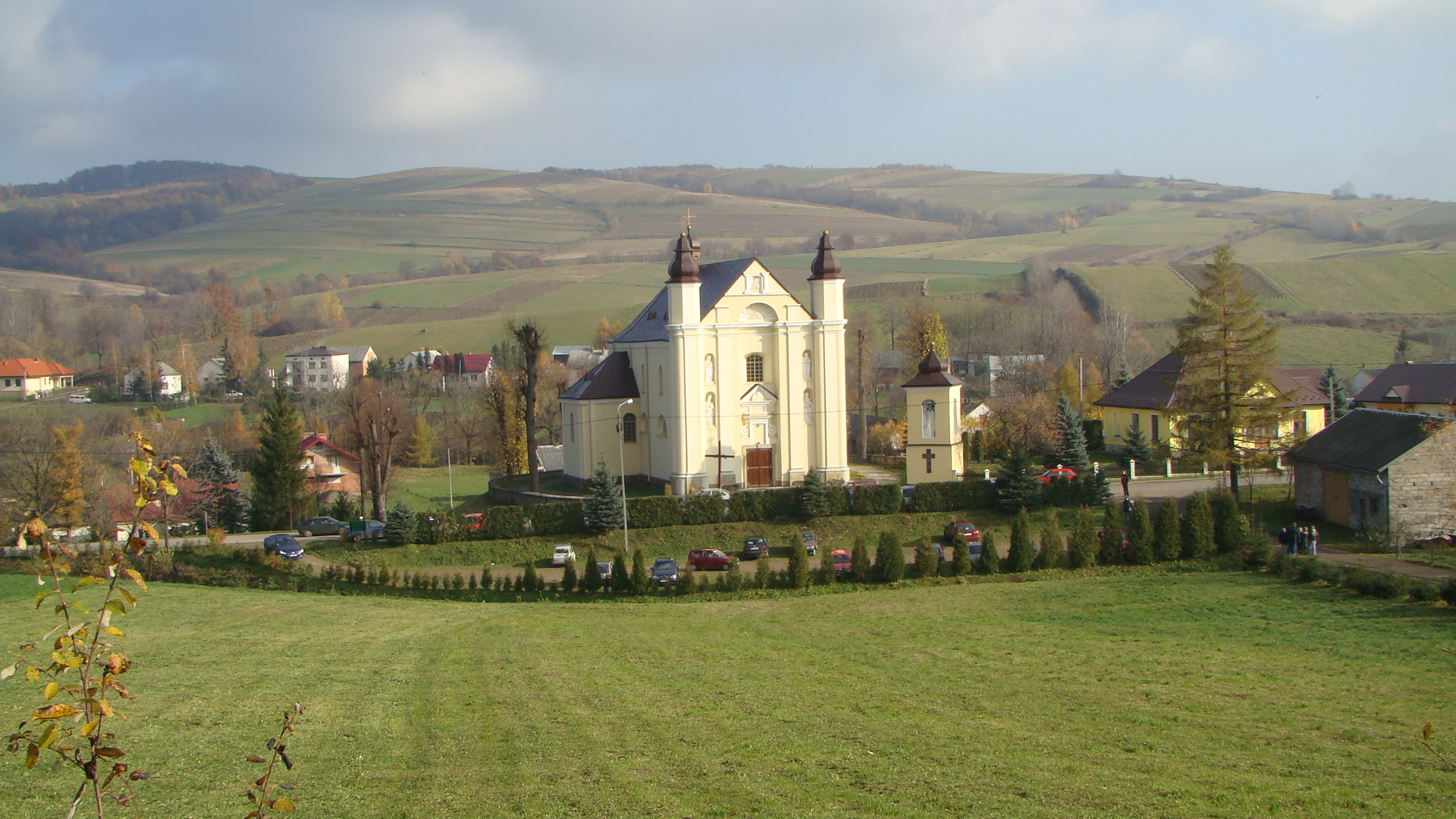
Latin church in Nowotaniec

Nowotaniec is just up the road from Bukowsko. Historically it has been a mostly Polish village. The region subsequently became part of the Great Moravian state. Upon the invasion of the Hungarian tribes into the heart of the Great Moravian Empire around 899, the Lendians of the area declared their allegiance to Hungarian Empire. The region then became a site of contention between Poland, Kievan Rus' and Hungary starting in at least the 9th century. This area was mentioned for the first time in 981 (by Nestor the Chronicler), when Vladimir the Great of Kiev took the area over on the way into Poland. In 1018 it returned to Poland, 1031 back to Rus', in 1340 Casimir III of Poland recovered it. In the 14th century the Galicia region along with the Sanok district were annexed to Poland by Casimir III the Great of Poland, who began colonisation of these areas (see: Walddeutsche). In the 14th and 15th centuries a number of new settlements were set up, including Trepcza, Czerteż, Prusiek, Nowotaniec, Kostarowce, Tyrawa Solna, Stróże Wielkie and Małe, Hłomcza, Płowce, Sanoczek, Międzybródź. Those settlements were owned by noble and knights’ families. Substantial land was the property of the Kmita family ruling from Sobień Castle, and Bal from Nowotaniec Castle.

Nowotaniec, with upper-suburb Nagorzany, a small town in the county of Sanok, lies in a wooded, hilly area on the highway from Zarszyn to Bukowsko (5.6 km or 3.5 mi away). The start of settlement that became Nowotaniec began as a royal village established in 1366 based on the Privilege of Casimir III the Great. The village was founded on the principles of the Magdeburg Rights, and its inhabitants were exempted from all taxes towards the king for a period of twenty years. In 1409, the ownership of Nowotaniec (Lobetanz) was passed over to the knights of Hungary (Petrus Hungarus de Lobetanz) and his brother. The town itself consists of a marketplace and several streets in the valley of the Pielnica river, a tributary of the Wisłok river (ger. Weisslog ) on the right bank, elevation 363 m (1,191 ft) above sea level. The parish belongs to the diocese of Przemyśl, deanery of Sanok, and includes Darow, Nadolany, Nagorzany, Pielnia, Puławy, Wola Jaworowa and Wola Sekowa with a total of 1,960 Roman Catholics and 156 Greek Catholics (in 1887). Not far from Nowotaniec lies the castle of Zboiska, built in 1529 by Odnowski, palatinate of Kraków.

The village was a center of the Polish Reformed Church and the Stano family were staunch members of it, supporting a Calvinist church in the village from the end of 16th century until 1713 when they sold the property to Roman Catholics and the Calvinist church in the village was suppressed.

In the first half of the 19th century plagues fell upon the residents of the region. From the time of the Austrian annexation (1772) Nowotaniec became a subdistrict settlement First owner Mathias Bal de Lobetanz (Bals ownership since 1366 - 1556), next owners family de Stano, since 1714 the Bukowskis family. In the 17th century the village was quite important centre of trade and craftsmanship. A good period ended in 1709, when it was looted by the Swedish troops in the Great Northern War. Nowotaniec was owned by the earl Jaworski-Sas since 1767, and currently Krziwkowicz-Pozniak owns to 1944. This part of Poland was controlled by Austria for almost 120 years. At that time the area (including west and east of Subcarpathian Voivodeship) was known as Galicia since 1772. The Roman Catholic Church in Nowotaniec has a collection of records for Nowotaniec and surrounding Roman Catholic villages in its parish like Nadolany and Nagórzany.

The Roman Catholic Church in Nowotaniec was established in 1409, the parish in 1424.

At the end of World War II, after the Germans withdrew, the Ukrainian Insurgent Army became active. Its units terrorised Polish population and destroyed military and police posts. Fights ended in 1947 when as the result of Operation Vistula the Ukrainian population was resettled to Western Poland. Between 1945 - 1949 Nowotaniec was the gmina due to the destruction of Bukowsko by the Ukrainian Insurgent Army.

The village was burned down April 1946 by the Ukrainian Insurgent Army too.

The first Jewish families appeared in Nowotaniec at the start of the 18th century. In 1765, 74 Jews lived in the village. They belonged to the Rymanów community (kohal). However, they have gotten independence earlier, before 1777. Then, 10-12 Jewish families were in village. Four houses belonged to they. In 1824, community (kohal) counted 84 persons. In 1870, 249 persons were Jewish inhabitants already. Community owned synagogue and school. 22 pupils walked for school. In 1900, Jewish community counted 287 persons. Did not have community in village Rabbi. Then, 148 Jews lived in city. In 1921, village counted 524 half-breeds, these 42 Jews in Nowotaniec. 1885 - Yeshi Michal Gilernter, born 1842 was appointed rabbi.

The isolated rural flat land has no sign or marker. No wall, fence, or gate surrounds. Reached by crossing private property, access is open to all. The unknown present owner uses site for agriculture. Properties adjacent are agricultural. Private visitors rarely visit. No maintenance. Vegetation is a seasonal problem preventing access. Water erosion is a moderate threat. For instance, in Podkarpacie, building permits have been granted to wind parks with total capacity of 42,93 MW, among them 3 wind farms: Bukowsko - Nowotaniec – 18 MW and other.

== Owners ==
Bals family (1366–1565) Lilium, de Stanos (1565–1713) Lilium, Bukowskis (1713–1746), Bronieckis (1746–1767), de Sas-Jaworskis (1767–1813) Sas, Wictors de Wiatrowice (1813–1944) Brochwicz, propretarius, de Krziwkowicz-Poźniak (1813–1944) Przestrzał.

== Monuments ==
- Roman Catholic church new building about 1745, the baroque church in Nowotaniec with historical equipment.

=== Hiking trails ===
- European walking route E8
- Wind Farm Bukowsko-Nowotaniec

== Industry ==
- Wind Farm Bukowsko-Nowotaniec

== Twin cities ==
- Topoľovka
- Maizières-lès-Metz

== See also ==
- Great Moravia
- Kingdom of Galicia and Lodomeria
- Lendians
- Lwów Voivodeship
- Ostsiedlung
- Pogórzanie
- Ruthenian Voivodeship
- Walddeutsche

== Literature ==
- Dr. Maurycy Maciszewski. Geographical Dictionary. "A Geographical Dictionary of Polish Kingdom". Vols. 1-15 reprinted from 1880 to 1902 Warsaw; Nowotaniec - translated by William Fred Hoffman, PGSA Fall 2001 Rodziny (digital edition)
- Prof. Przemysław Dąbkowski. Stosunki narodowościowe w ziemi sanockiej w XV wieku. Lwów. 1921.
- Dr. Adam Fastnacht. Slownik Historyczno-Geograficzny Ziemi Sanockiej w Średniowieczu (Historic-Geographic Dictionary of the Sanok District in the Middle Ages), Kraków, 2002, ISBN 83-88385-14-3.
- Records of the Institut für Deutsche Ostarbeit, Sektion für Rasse- und –Volkstumforschung 1940–1943. Boxes 50–51, 50. [Forms with pictures of people from Nowotaniec]
- Prof. Feliks Kiryk - Rocznik sanocki. 2006. "Bukowsko-Nowotaniec" str. 92-115
- Jerzy Zuba "W Gminie Bukowsko". Roksana, 2004, ISBN 83-7343-150-0. Translated by Deborah Greenlee. Arlington, TX 76016.
