= Pielnica =

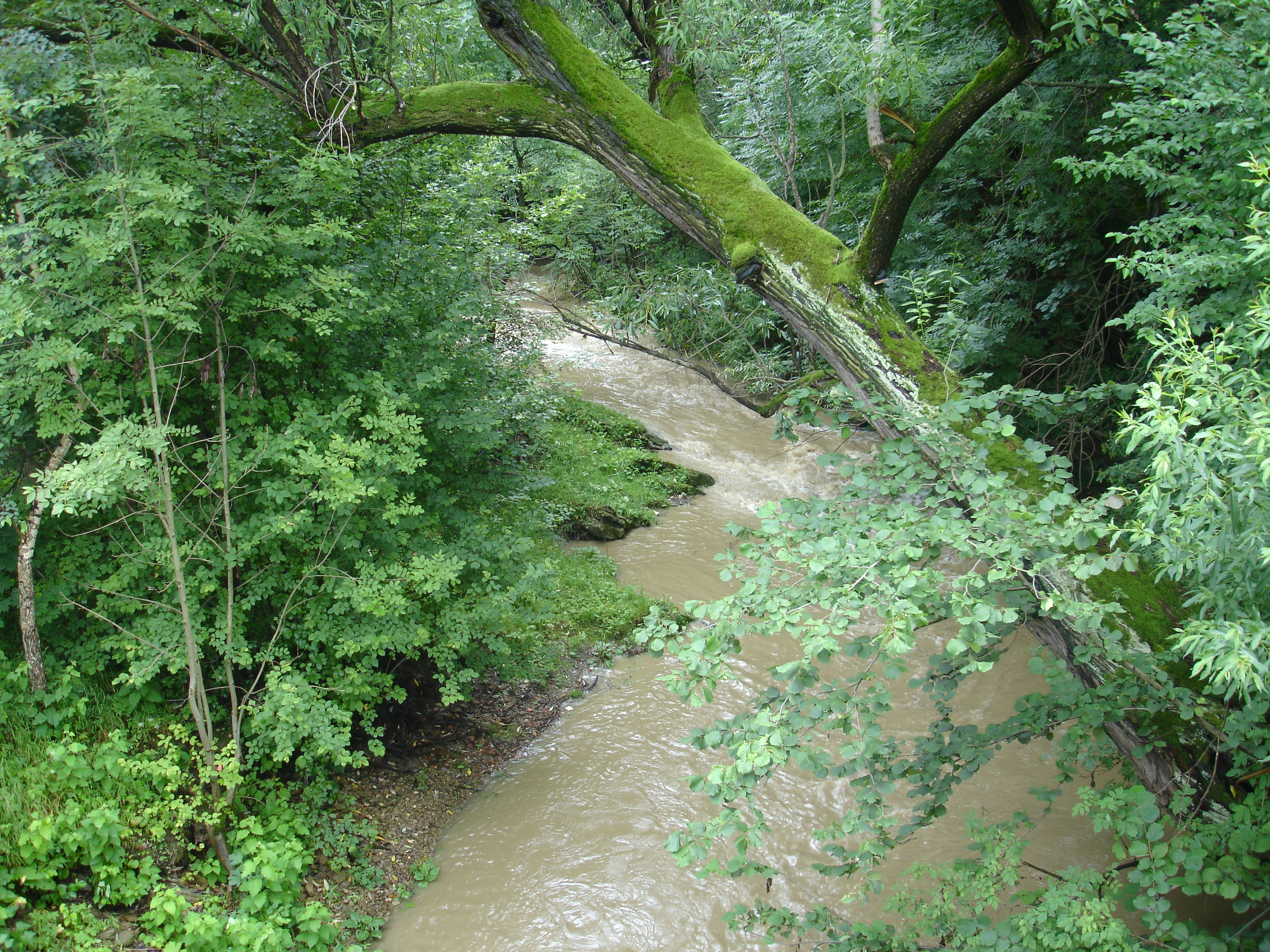

Location
- Country: Poland

Physical characteristics
- Source
  - location: Bieszczady Mountains
- Mouth
  - location: Wisłok
  - coordinates: 49°37′29″N 21°57′04″E
- Length: 63 km (39 mi)
- Basin size: 940 km^{2} (360 sq mi)

Basin features
- Progression: Wisłok→ San→ Vistula→ Baltic Sea

The Pielnica (Polish pronunciation: [pʲɛlˈɲitsa]; German: Pella or Piella 1419, Pielica 1441, Pielnyka 1512) is a river in South-Eastern Poland. Its name comes from the ancient German dialect word piella, the river, a tributary of the Wislok on the right bank. It originates in the Bieszczady Mountains and flows through western Pogórze Bukowskie. The Pielnica arises in the Carpathian Mountains near the peak Skibce, at an elevation of 776 metres, near on the Polish–Slovak border. The river ultimately flows into the Wisłok at Besko, north of Sanok. Several streams flow into the Pielnica there from nearby hills, namely, on the west from Wysoka Góra (432 meters), and on the east from Bukowica (541 meters).

== Villages ==
Main sections: Nowotaniec, Nadolaly, Nagórzany, Wola Sękowa, Odrzechowa, Pielnia, Długie, Besko.

The Pielnica valley must have been an important trade route and human settlement axis as early as 14th or 15th century. The region subsequently became part of the Great Moravian state. Upon the invasion of the Hungarian tribes into the heart of the Great Moravian Empire around 899, the Lendians of the area declared their allegiance to Hungarian Empire. The region then became a site of contention between Poland, Kievan Rus and Hungary starting in at least the 9th century. This area was mentioned for the first time in 981 (by Nestor), when Volodymyr the Great of Kievan Rus took the area over on the way into Poland. In 1018 it returned to Poland, 1031 back to Rus, in 1340 Casimir III of Poland recovered it.

In historical records the river was first mentioned in 1361. Before World War II, the Pielnica and Osława line, was designated as the wild frontier between Poles and Lemkos.

== Hiking trails ==
- European walking route E8
  - Pasmo Bukowicy - Kanasiówka (823 m) – Wisłok Wielki – Tokarnia (778 m), 1 km – Wola Piotrowa
  - Komańcza – Dołżyca – Garb Średni (822 m) – Kanasiówka (823 m) – Moszczaniec – Surowica – Darów – Puławy Górne– Besko

== Bibliography ==
- Prof. Adam Fastnacht: Osadnictwo Ziemi Sanockiej, 1946
- Prof. Adam Fastnacht – Slownik Historyczno-Geograficzny Ziemi Sanockiej w Sredniowieczu, Kraków 2002, ISBN 83-88385-14-3
