= Wisłok Dolny =

Lemko village in Poland

Wisłok Dolny Вислік Долішній
- Settlement
- Location within Poland
- Coordinates: 49°31′N 22°05′E
- Country: Poland
- Beskids: Subcarpathian Voivodship
- Founded: 1366

Area
  - Total: 6.3 km^{2} (2.4 sq mi)
- Elevation: 482 m (1,581 ft)

Population
  - Total: 200
- Postal code: 38500

Wisłok Dolny is a settlement in Sanok County, Lesser Poland in the Lesser Beskid mountains, in the parish of Nowotaniec, Poland. Formerly an independent village, it is now part of Wisłok Wielki.

== History ==
The village was first mentioned in 1361. In 1785 the village lands comprised 6.14 km^{2}. There were 820 Catholics and 41 Jews.

Saint Onufrius Church was built in 1850, and still stands. A wooden church replaced an older church from at least 1828.

In April 1946 a battle between the Polish army and the UPA took place. A dozen years after the war, the village started to rebuild. Many people were deported as part of ethnic cleansing from Wisłok on April 29, 1947 (Operation Vistula) to the Pomeranian area of Poland and many already had been deported to the Soviet Union in 1946.
