= Wisłok Wielki =

Lemko village in Poland

Wisłok Wielki Вислік
- Village
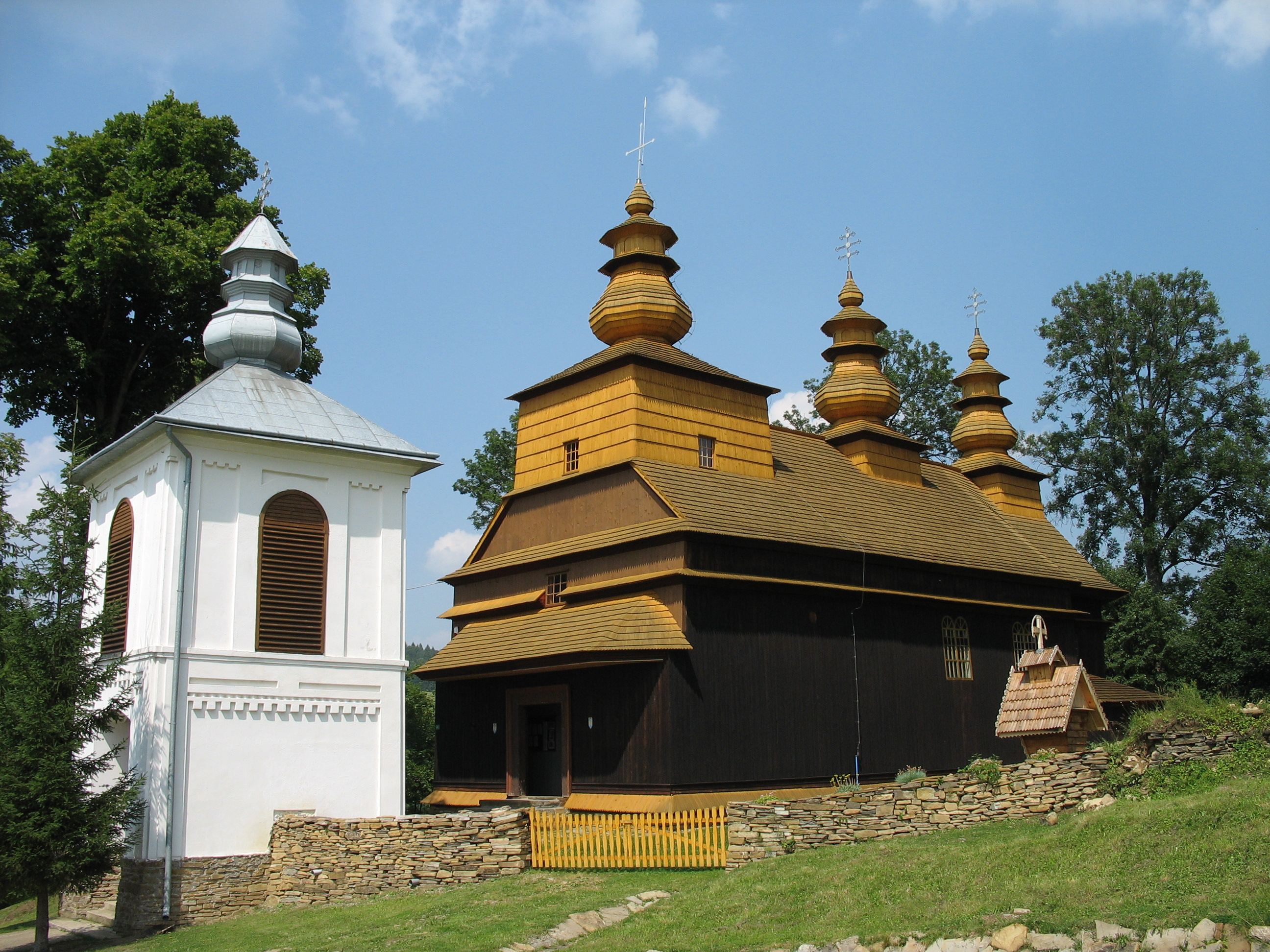
- The Latin church parish of Saint Onuphrius in Wisłok Wielki.
- Etymology: The root of the name Vis-lok is Indo-European or pre-Indo-European (see also Wis-łoka, Wis-ła.)
- Location within Poland
- Coordinates: 49°21′10″N 22°04′30″E
- Country: Poland
- Voivodeship: Subcarpathian
- County: Sanok
- Gmina: Komańcza
- First mentioned: 1361

Area
  - Total: 6.3 km^{2} (2.4 sq mi)
- Elevation: 482 m (1,581 ft)

Population (31 December 2002)
  - Total: 250
  - Density: 40/km^{2} (100/sq mi)
- Time zone: UTC+1 (CET)
  - Summer (DST): UTC+2 (CEST)
- Postal code: 38 543
- Car plate: KUS, RSA
- Website: www.komancza.pl

Wisłok Wielki (Polish pronunciation: [ˈviswɔk ˈfjɛlkʲi]) is a village in the Bukowsko Upland mountains. Since 1999 it is situated in the Subcarpathian Voivodship (province) of south-eastern Poland; previously in Krosno Voivodship (1975–1998) and Sanok district, Bukowsko subdistrict, located near the towns of Medzilaborce and Palota (in northeastern Slovakia). It was formerly officially divided into two parts: Wisłok Górny ("upper Wisłok") and Wisłok Dolny ("lower Wisłok"). The name "Wisłok Wielki" means "great Wisłok".

== History ==
Wisłok Wielki (Lemko: Vyslik Velykyi) was first mentioned, according to historical accounts, in 1361. In 1785 the village lands comprised 6.14 km^{2} (2.37 sq mi). Reportedly at the time, there were 711 Eastern-rite Catholics. The historical record relates that in 1361 the brothers Peter and Paul, "from Hungary," as feudal landholders, "owned" Wisłok Wielki, along with Bukowsko and several other area villages (see Nowotaniec, Zboiska, Humniska etc.). Located in the Ruthenian voivodeship of the Polish-Lithuanian Commonwealth, Polish Kingdom and later Austria-Hungary Empire, the village, isolated and remote, remained largely impervious to change.

During World War I, the region would be at the epicentre of the conflict between the Austro-Hungarian and the Russian empires, with several small battles conducted in the vicinity of the Wisłok Wielki. At the conclusion of the global conflict and with the collapse of Austria-Hungary, founded a short-lived republic, the Wyslok Republic, with a Ukrainian orientation, briefly lasting from 2 November 1918 to 23 January 1919.

Wisłok Wielki remained an isolated village, bounded on all sides by smaller, equally homogeneous, RUS villages; .Poles were outnumbered only by Jews at the market centre of Bukowsko). The convention followed was historically the same - both partners adhered to the language and religion of the community in which they resided, and their children were raised accordingly. During the 1930s, although there were tensions over issues of language, education and official assimilation, communal relations at the local level between Lemkos and Poles in the Sanok County were favorable.

In 1939, Wisłok Wielki was occupied by German forces (the Soviet-German demarcation line followed the line of the San River a short distance to the east). Men, women, as well as children were taken to Germany and Austria for purposes of forced labour. Throughout the war the Germans were astute in exploiting aspirations of the nationally conscious Ukrainians.. Subject to vicissitudes of war, the local population would be decimated. The violence, however, did not end in 1945.

Part of the post-war Polish-Soviet resettlement campaign, Wisłok Wielki was destroyed 1946–1947 and the indigenous population cleansed in the joint Polish-Soviet effort "exchange of populations" agreement. This was ethnic cleansing of all Ukrainians from Poland. A majority of the inhabitants were deported to the Ukrainian Soviet Socialist Republic. Others who remained were subsequently deported to counties along Poland's Baltic coast, especially in the newly acquired former German territories in northwestern Poland, during Operation Vistula.

During the mid-1950s, large investments in the State Farms were made in Wisłok Wielki. Major improvements in local communications and infrastructure were also undertaken. The Byzantine-styled village church in Lower Wisłok Wielki, originally built in 1785, was destroyed in 1946, although the remnants of a cemetery are still visible. The ecclesiastical structure in Upper Wisłok Wielki, on the other hand, has survived.

== Hiking trails ==
- European walking route E8

== Literature ==
- Prof. Adam Fastnacht. Slownik Historyczno-Geograficzny Ziemi Sanockiej w Średniowieczu (Historic-Geographic Dictionary of the Sanok District in the Middle Ages), Kraków, 2002, ISBN 83-88385-14-3.
- C.M. Hann. A Village Without Solidarity: Polish Peasantry in Years of Crisis. 1985.
