= Strug (river) =

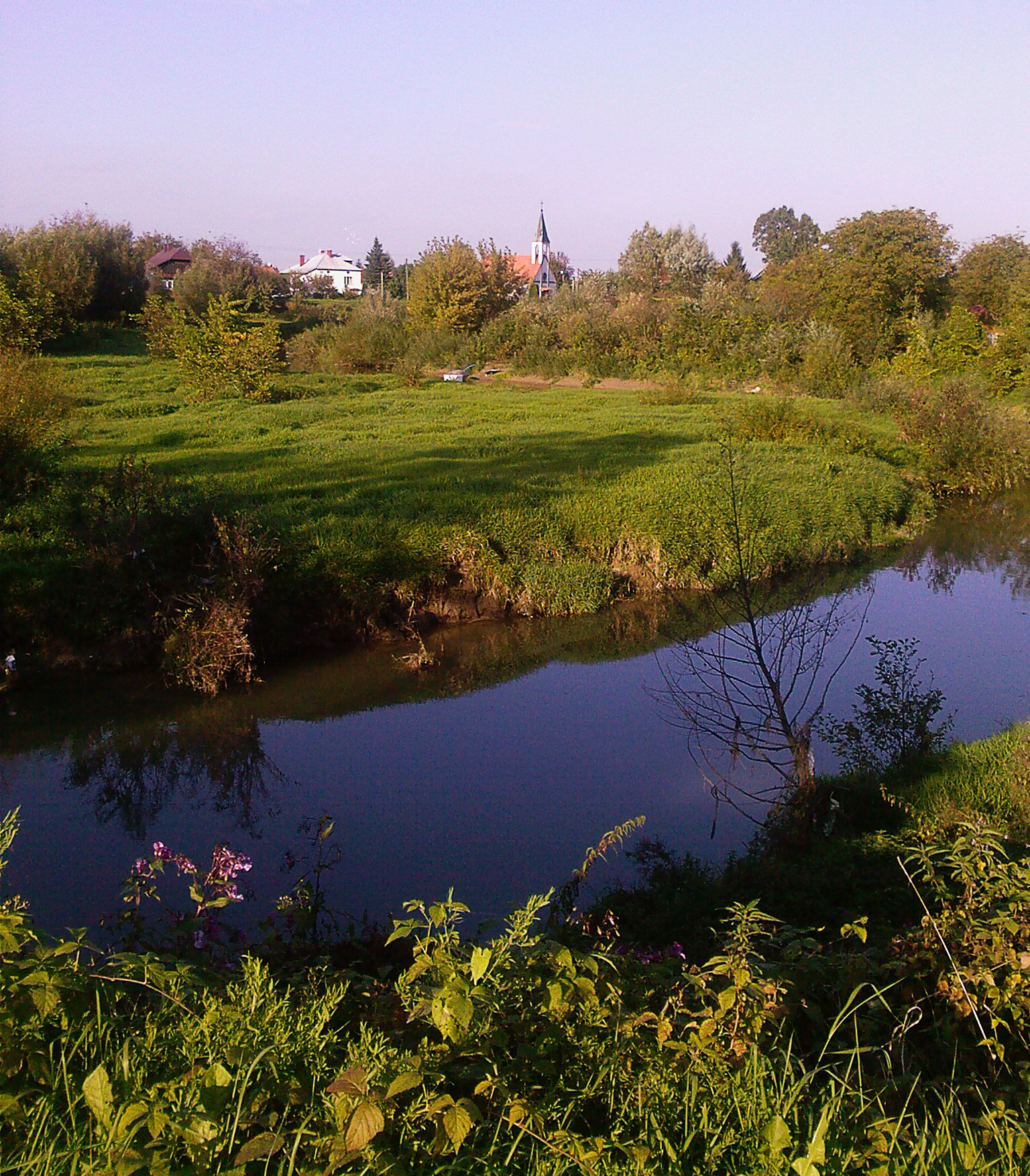
- The Strug near its mouth, near Rzeszów

Location
- Country: Poland
- Voivodeship: Podkarpackie

Physical characteristics
- Source
  - location: south of Borek Stary, Rzeszów County
  - coordinates: 49°56′22″N 22°05′51″E
- Mouth: Wisłok
  - location: Drabinianka, Rzeszów
  - coordinates: 50°00′15″N 21°59′38″E
- Length: 35 km (22 mi)

Basin features
- Progression: Wisłok→ San→ Vistula→ Baltic Sea

Strug is a river of Poland, a tributary of the Wisłok near Rzeszów.
