= Łupków Pass =

Mountain pass in Poland and Slovakia

- Location within Subcarpathian Voivodeship Location within Prešov Region
- Elevation: 640 metres (2,100 ft)
- Traversed by: Road (and rail in tunnel)

Third Approach
- Location: Poland
- Range: Carpathian Mountains
- Coordinates: 49°15′N 22°2′E

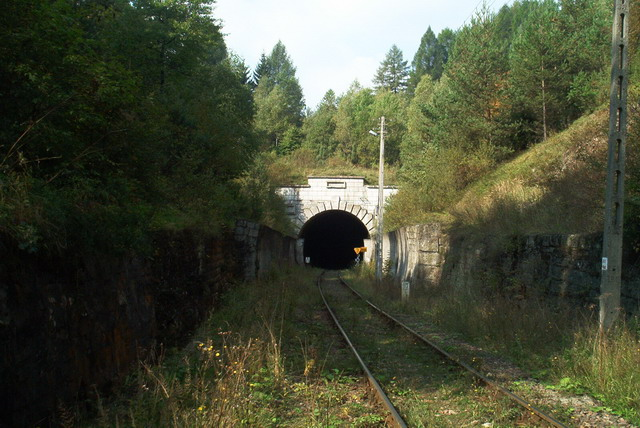
Tunnel entrance on the Polish side

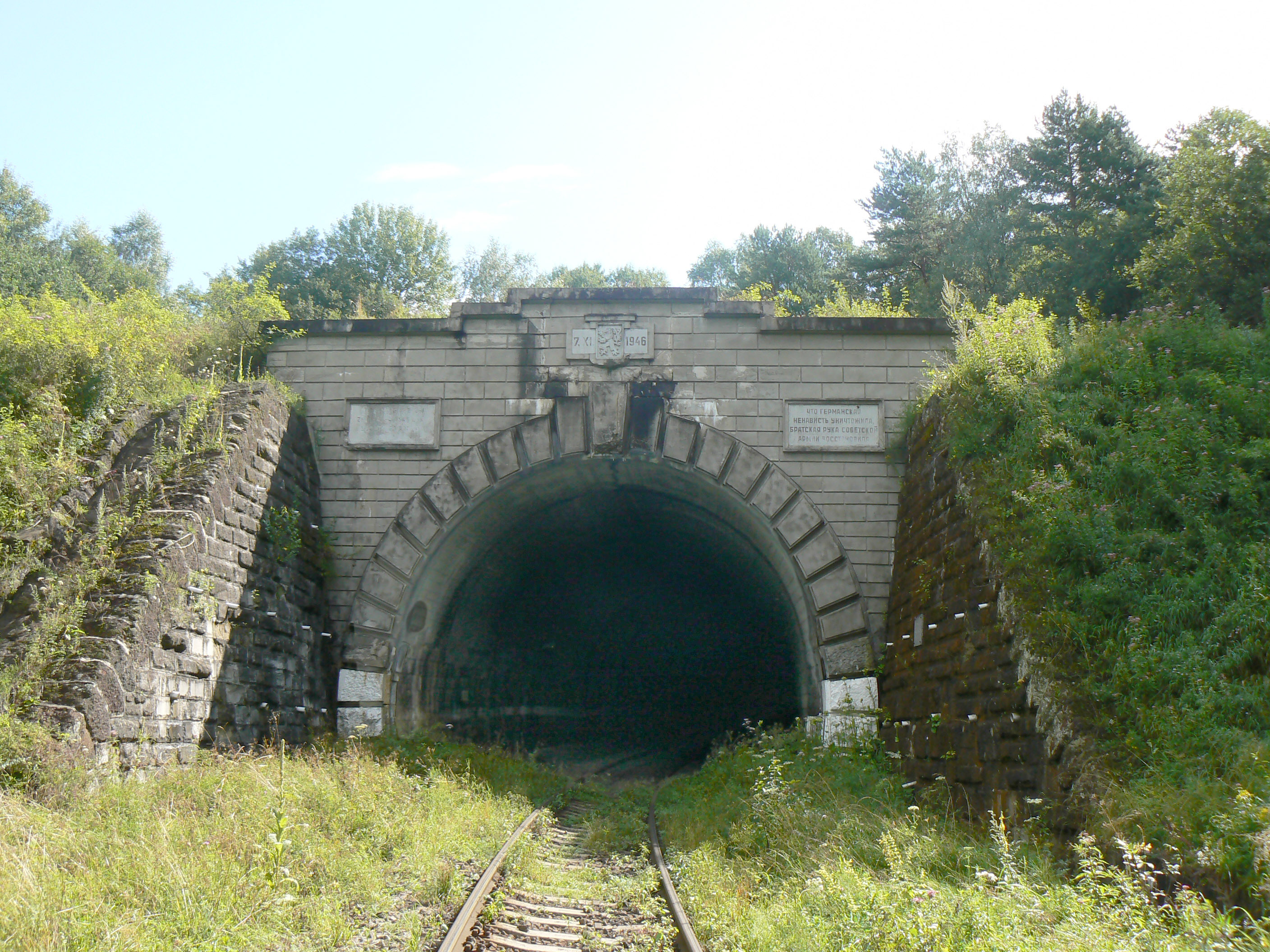
Tunnel entrance on the Slovak side

Łupków Pass or Lupkov Pass (Polish: Przełęcz Łupkowska, Slovak: Lupkovský priesmyk) is a significant mountain pass in the Carpathian Mountains on the border between Poland and Slovakia, and close to the western border of Ukraine. Its highest point rises 640 m above sea level. It is located just south of the village Łupków in Poland and east of Medzilaborce in Slovakia. Underneath the pass runs a railway tunnel 642 m long, straddling the border between Poland and Slovakia.

The Łupków Pass separates the Low Beskids from the Bieszczady Mountains.

The tunnel and the associated railway line were finished in 1874, to link Galicia with the rest of the Austro-Hungarian Empire across the Carpathian mountains. Given that it was such a vital communications link, the pass had considerable strategic importance.

Łupków Pass was one of the strategically important Carpathian passes bitterly contested in battles on the Eastern Front of World War I during the winter of 1914/1915. A Russian attempt to stand on the line of the Wisłok river and the Łupków Pass failed before renewed Austro-German attacks on 8 May 1915. The railway tunnel was demolished and rebuilt multiple times during both World Wars. It was rebuilt again in 1946 but saw little use afterwards. Only in 1999 was regular passenger rail service reestablished through the pass.

== See also ==
- List of highest paved roads in Europe
- List of mountain passes
