= Wola Sękowa =

- Village
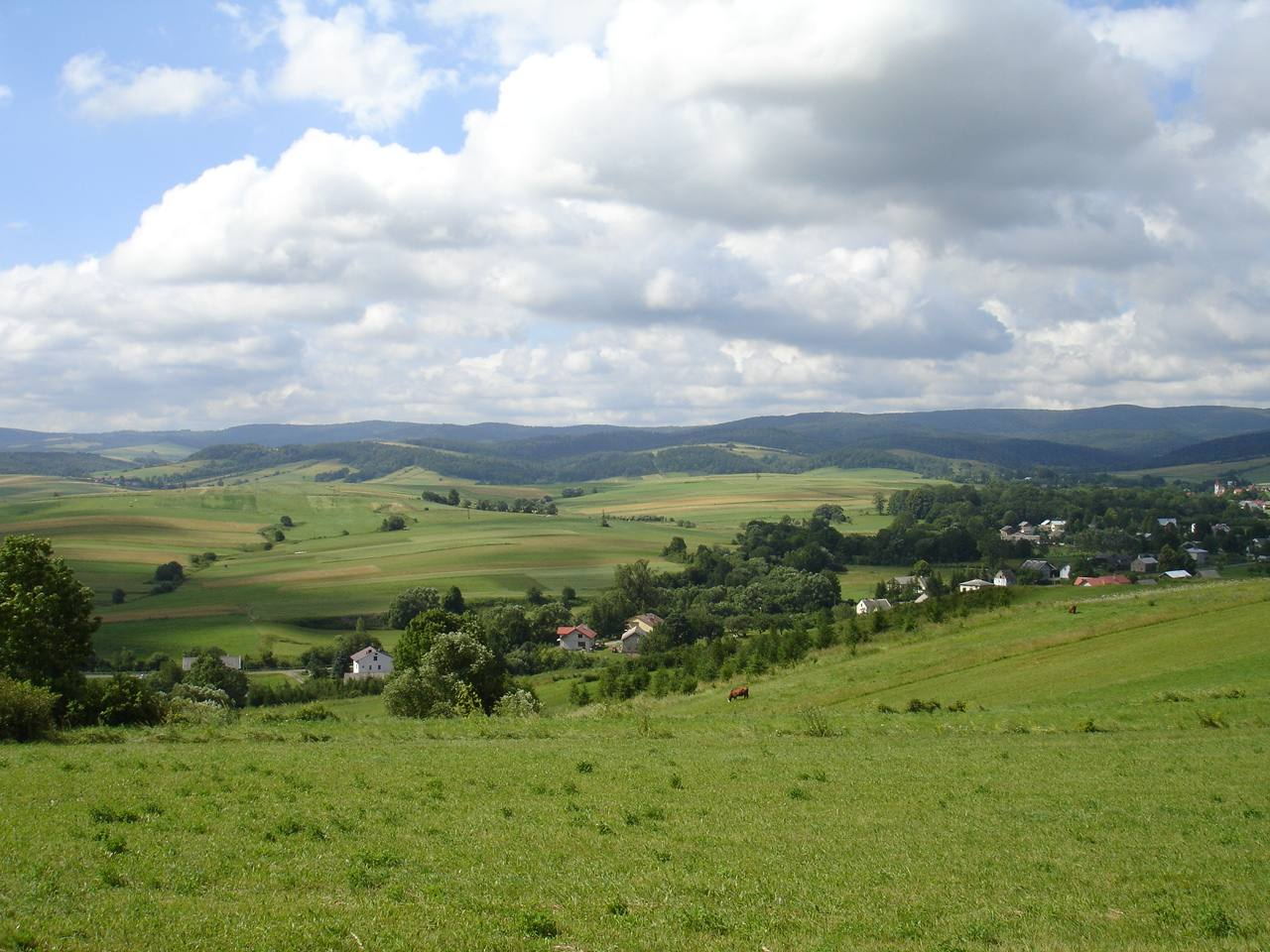
- The Pogórze Bukowskie is a hilly region (thus the name, Bukowsko hilly region) in Poland. Wola Sękowa center of village.
- Etymology: Its name comes from the west slavic dialect word Wola and Sienko, meaning little village of Simon
- Location within Poland
- Coordinates: 49°30′16″N 22°00′16″E
- Country: Poland
- Voivodeship: Subcarpathian
- County: Sanok
- Gmina: Bukowsko
- First mentioned: 1493

Area
  - Total: 8.8 km^{2} (3.4 sq mi)
- Elevation: 270 m (890 ft)

Population (31 December 2002)
  - Total: 220
  - Density: 25/km^{2} (65/sq mi)
- Time zone: UTC+1 (CET)
  - Summer (DST): UTC+2 (CEST)
- Postal code: 38 507
- Car plate: KUS, RSA
- Website: http://www.bukowsko.pl

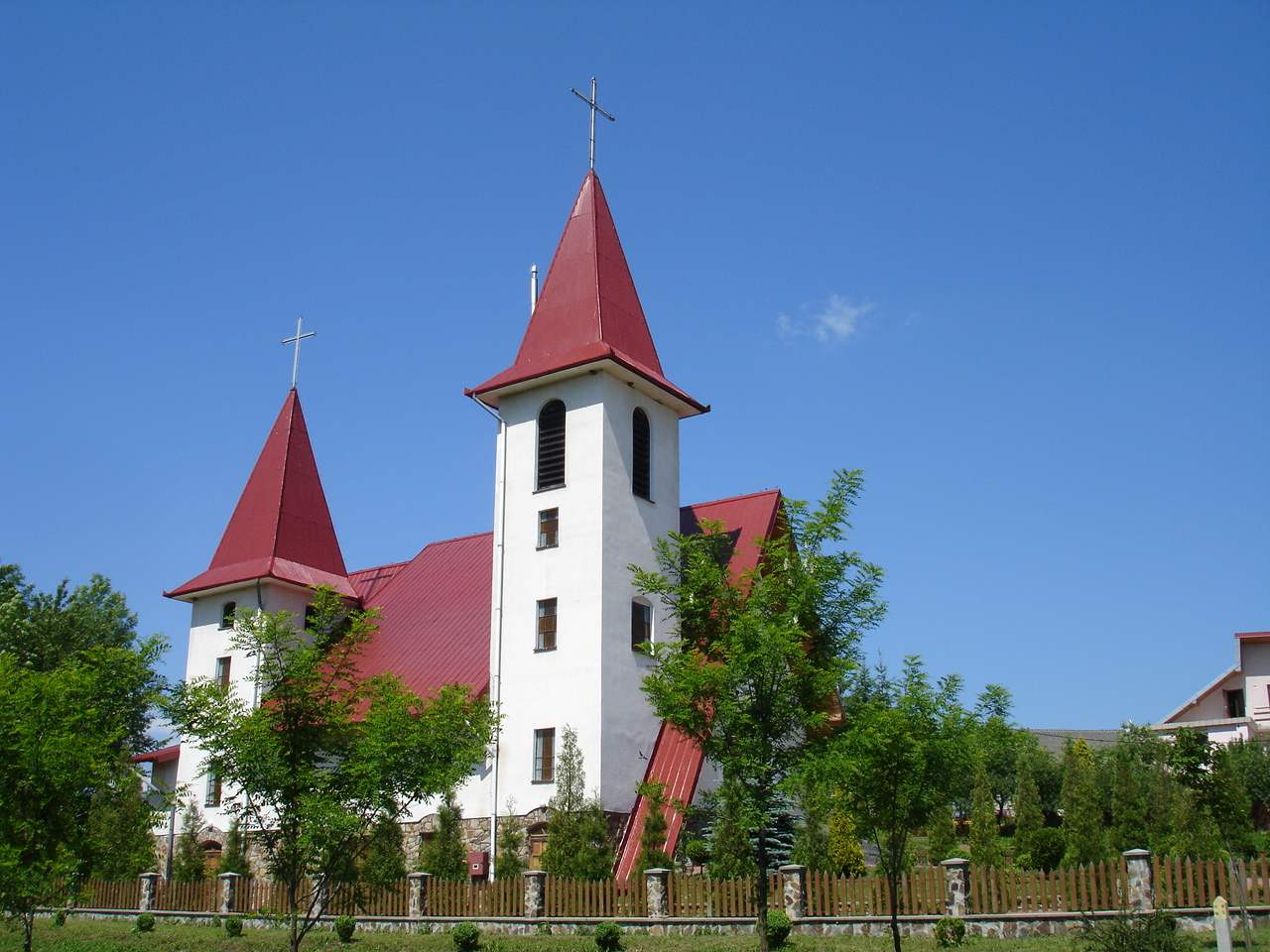
Latin church of St. Michael Archangel in Wola Sękowa

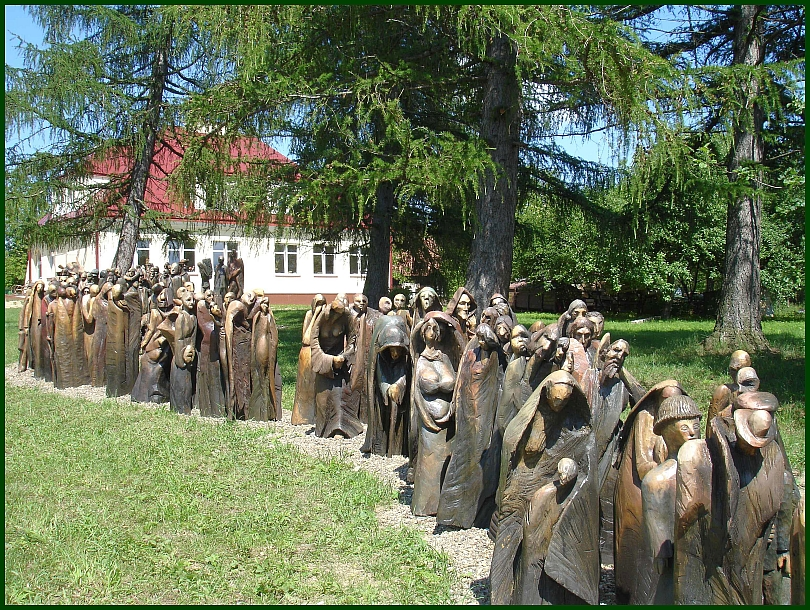
Exodus - multiartistic project - Wola Sękowa

Wola Sękowa [ˈvɔla sɛŋˈkɔva] is a village in East Małopolska in the Bukowsko Upland mountains, Bukowsko rural commune, parish in Bukowsko.

Wola Sękowa is about 24 kilometres (15 mi) from Sanok in southeast Poland near the border with Slovakia and Ukraine. It is situated below the main watershed at the foot of the Słonne Mountain, and has an elevation of 340 metres. It is located in the Subcarpathian Voivodship (since 1999), previously in Krosno Voivodship (1975–1998) and Sanok district, (16 km or 10 mi east of Sanok). Nearby towns include Medzilaborce and Palota (in northeastern Slovakia) and Nowotaniec being a nearby village. The village lies near the Pielnica River at the foot of the Bukowica mountains, which are the main trail in Pogórze Bukowskie.

== Hiking trails ==
- European walking route E8

== Literature ==
- Prof. Adam Fastnacht. Slownik Historyczno-Geograficzny Ziemi Sanockiej w Średniowieczu (Historic-Geographic Dictionary of the Sanok District in the Middle Ages), Kraków, 2002, ISBN 83-88385-14-3.
