= Borov =

- Coordinates: 49.302003°N 21.887115°E
- Country: Slovakia
- County: Prešov Region
- Borov: 1543
- Founded by: Ferdinand I

Borov is a village in Slovakia.

== Location ==
Borov is located 4 km north of the center of Medzilaborce within the Prešov Region, on the banks of the Laborc river.

== History ==
The village was founded by emperor Ferdinand I in 1543. An important document in the history of Borov is the list of Taxpayers in the village, dating from 1715 and stored in the Hungarian National Archives in Budapest. That document lists the names of 16 families in the village who paid taxes. In 1720, there was a working mill and 18 households in the village. By 1787 the village had grown to 84 buildings and 487 inhabitants. These inhabitants made their living mainly by logging, charcoal burning, shepherding and cart driving. Between 1830 and 1873 various cholera outbreaks affected the population of Borov. During these years a significant number of inhabitants emigrated to North and South America, Africa and Australia. During the two World Wars Borov suffered severely. The Jewish population before World War II made up about 30% of the villagers, and during the Nazi occupation the majority of these Jewish villagers were murdered. In 1971 the village was incorporated into the city of Medzilaborce. Even after that incorporation, Borov continued to develop; a ski lift was built and a grandstand was erected and the local playground was renovated in 1995.
