= Gmina Besko =

Gmina Besko Besko Commune
- Gmina
- Coat of arms
- Interactive map of Gmina Besko
- Coordinates (Besko): 49°35′N 21°57′E
- Country: Poland
- Voivodeship: Subcarpathian
- County: Sanok
- Seat: Besko

Area
  - Total: 27.5 km^{2} (10.6 sq mi)

Population (2006)
  - Total: 4,242
  - Density: 154/km^{2} (400/sq mi)
- Website: http://www.besko.pl

Gmina Besko is a rural gmina (administrative district) in Sanok County, Subcarpathian Voivodeship, in south-eastern Poland. Its seat is the village of Besko, which lies approximately 20 kilometres (12 mi) west of Sanok and 51 km (32 mi) south of the regional capital Rzeszów. The gmina also contains the villages of Mymoń and Poręby.

The gmina covers an area of 27.6 square kilometres (10.7 sq mi), and as of 2006 its total population is 4,242. Ethnic groups in the region include Poles and Pogorzans.

== Neighbouring gminas ==
Gmina Besko is bordered by the gminas of Haczów, Rymanów and Zarszyn.

== Massacre during Second World War ==
During the German Invasion of Poland in 1939, German forces on 11 September murdered 21 villagers. The victims include Poles and Ukrainians, one woman, and a priest.
