= Mymoń =

- Village
- Location within Poland
- Coordinates: 49°34′23″N 21°56′40″E
- Country: Poland
- Voivodeship: Subcarpathian
- County: Sanok
- Gmina: Besko
- Website: http://www.mymon.yoyo.pl/

Mymoń [ˈmɨmɔɲ] is a village in the administrative district of Gmina Besko, within Sanok County, Subcarpathian Voivodeship, in south-eastern Poland.
