= Glass LPS =

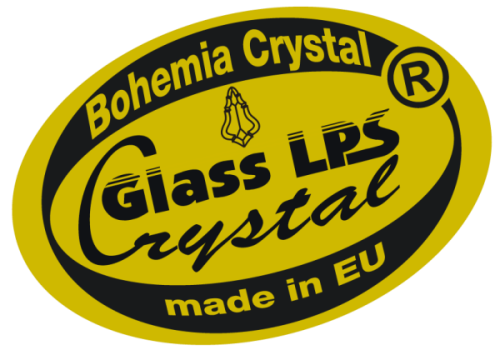
- Founded: 1999
- Headquarters: Medzilaborce, Slovakia
- Products: crystal lightings, crystal pendants
- Website: www.glasslps.eu

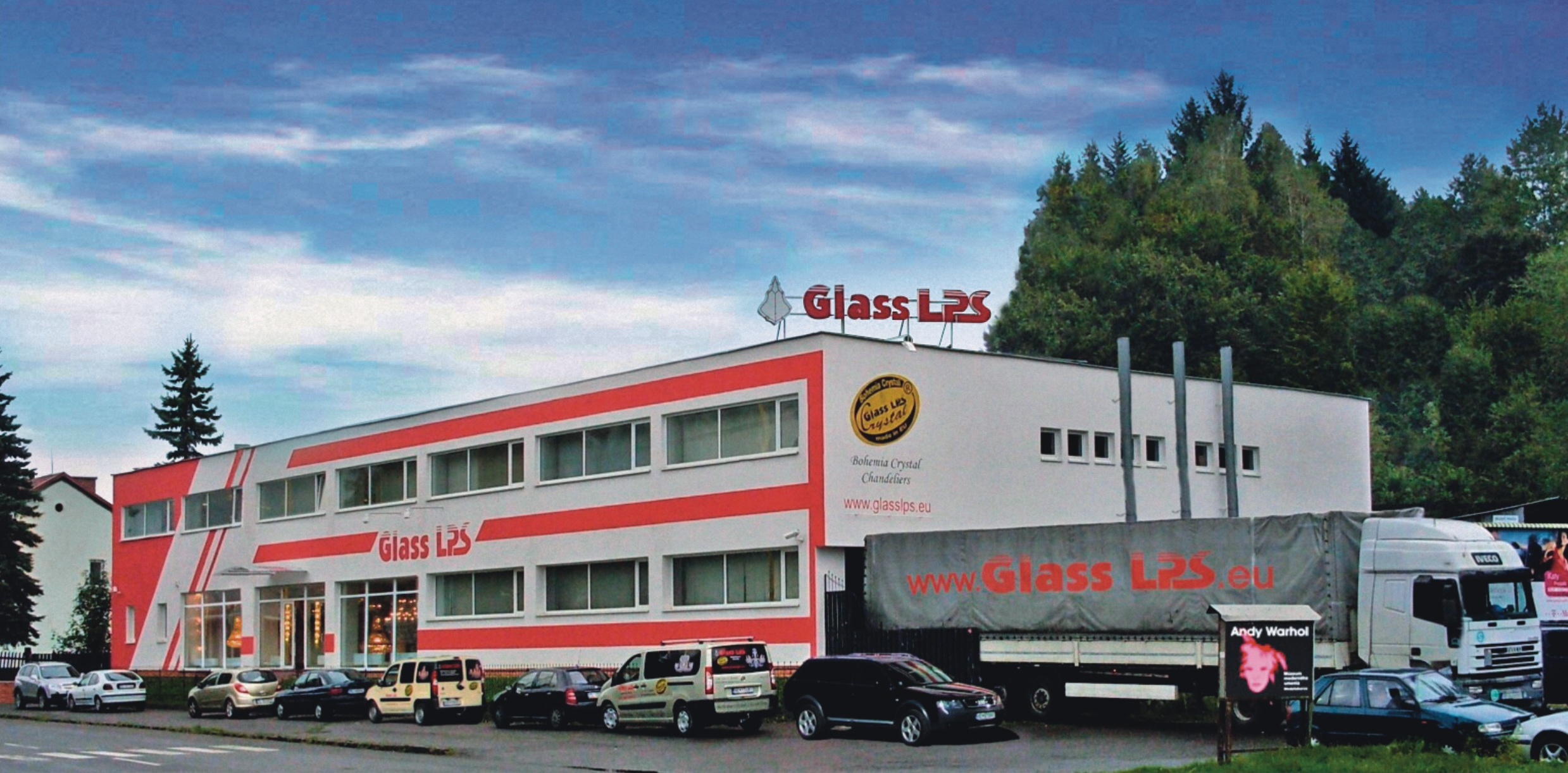
Glass LPS - manufacturer of crystal lightings.

Glass LPS is a manufacturer of crystal lightings and crystal pendants and one of the major companies in eastern Slovakia, which processes crystal is located in town Medzilaborce.

As a main raw material for further process and production of crystal pendants company uses Czech crystal BOHEMIA CRYSTAL.

Products of the company include crystal chandeliers with crystal elements from Swarovski.

The company exports 90% of their production.

== History ==
The start of crystal production began in Medzilaborce in 1970, when a well-known Czech company Jablonecke sklarne opened a branch in Medzilaborce, Slovakia. After division of Czechoslovakia into two independent states Czech Republic and Slovakia as well as privatization of companies it stopped its existence. Glass LPS has continued in the tradition of processing crystal and still produces crystal lamps and crystal pendants in Medzilaborce.

The company was founded in 1999.

== Sources ==
- www.glasslps.eu
