= Mikośka =

Location
- Country: Poland

Physical characteristics
- Mouth
  - location: Wisłok
  - coordinates: 50.0400°N 22.0158°E

Basin features
- Progression: Wisłok→ San→ Vistula→ Baltic Sea

Mikośka is a river of Poland, a tributary of the Wisłok in Rzeszów.
