= Poręby, Sanok County =

Poręby
- Village
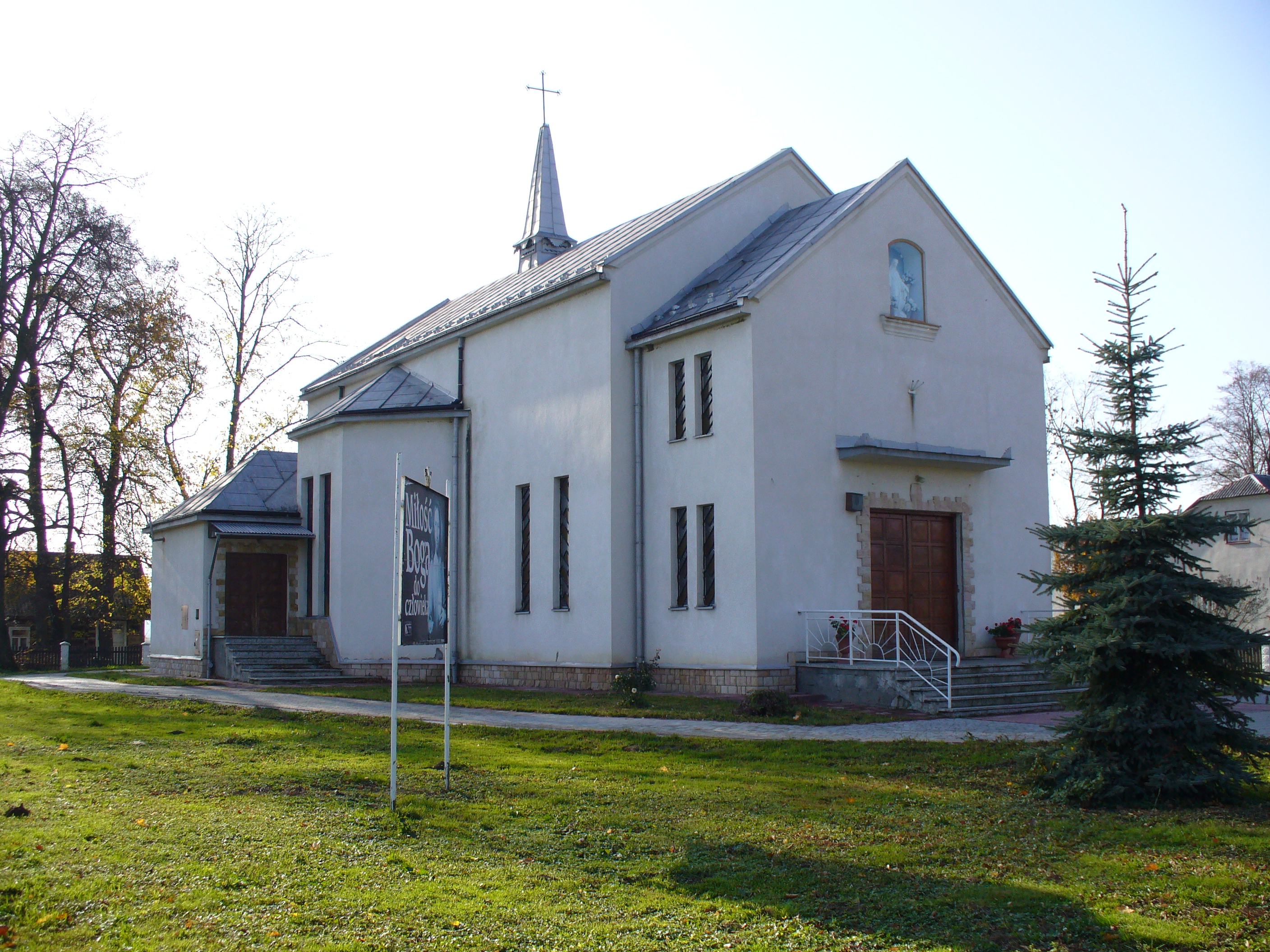
- Church

- Location within Poland
- Coordinates: 49°37′25″N 21°56′07″E
- Country: Poland
- Voivodeship: Podkarpackie
- County: Sanok
- Gmina: Besko
- Population: 196

Poręby [pɔˈrɛmbɨ] is a village in the administrative district of Gmina Besko, within Sanok County, Podkarpackie Voivodeship, in south-eastern Poland.
