= Wisłok =

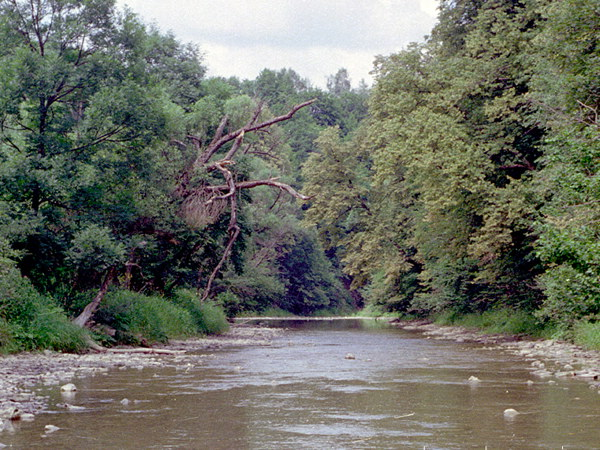

Location
- Country: Poland

Physical characteristics
- Source
  - location: Carpathian Mountains
- Mouth
  - location: San
  - coordinates: 50°12′21″N 22°32′0″E
- Length: 220 km (140 mi)
- Basin size: 3,538 km^{2} (1,366 sq mi)
- Discharge
  - average: 24.5 m^{3}/s (870 cu ft/s)

Basin features
- Progression: San→ Vistula→ Baltic Sea

Wisłok is a river in south-eastern Poland, a tributary of the San River, with a length of 220 kilometres and a basin area of 3,538 km^{2} (all in Poland). The root of the name Vis-lok is Indo-European or pre-Indo-European.

The first metal bridges on highways were built in Galicia. They were bridges on the Wisłok river in Rzeszów (1877) and Raba in Książnica (1877). The construction of the first latticework metal bridges in Poland's territories.

== History ==
There is no data on the settlements in the early Iron period when an old trade route crossed the region along Wisłok River Valley. The Wisłok valley must have been an important trade route and human settlement axis as early as 9th or 10th century. The region subsequently became part of the Great Moravian state. Upon the invasion of the Hungarian tribes into the heart of the Great Moravian Empire around 899, the Lendians of the area declared their allegiance to Hungarian Empire. The region then became a site of contention between Poland, Kievan Rus and Hungary starting in at least the 9th century. This area was mentioned for the first time in 981 (by Nestor), when Volodymyr the Great of Kievan Rus took the area over on the way into Poland. In 1018 it returned to Poland, 1031 back to Rus, in 1340 Casimir III of Poland recovered it

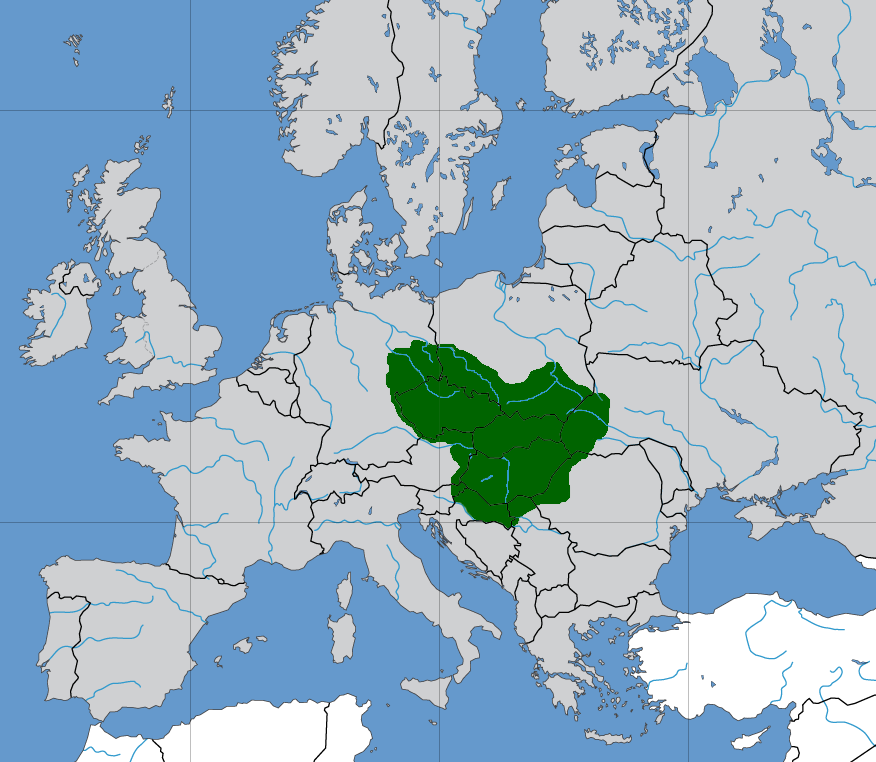
Approximate borders of Great Moravia at its greatest extent on an older map (in 890–894)

In historical records the river was first mentioned in 1372. During 966 – 1018, 1340–1772 (Ruthenian Voivodeship) and during 1918 – 1939 the region was a part of Poland.

Actually the intensive development of human settlements in the region took place during 13th–15th centuries. The settlements were located according to the German Law within an area flanked by Wisłok and Wisłoka rivers. Germans settled in the territory of the Kingdom of Poland (territory of present-day Województwo podkarpackie) from the 14th to 15th centuries (see Ostsiedlung), mostly after the region returned to Polish sphere of influence in 1340, when Casimir III of Poland took the Czerwień towns. There were probably some isolated settlers in the area of Krosno, Sanok, Łańcut, Biecz and Rzeszów earlier. The Germans were usually attracted by kings seeking specialists in various trades, such as craftsmen and miners. They usually settled in newer market and mining settlements. The main settlement areas were in the vicinity of Krosno and some language islands in the Pits and the Rzeszów regions. The settlers in the Pits region were known as Uplander Sachsen. Until approximately the 15th century, the ruling classes of most cities in present-day Beskidian Piedmont consisted almost exclusively of Germans.

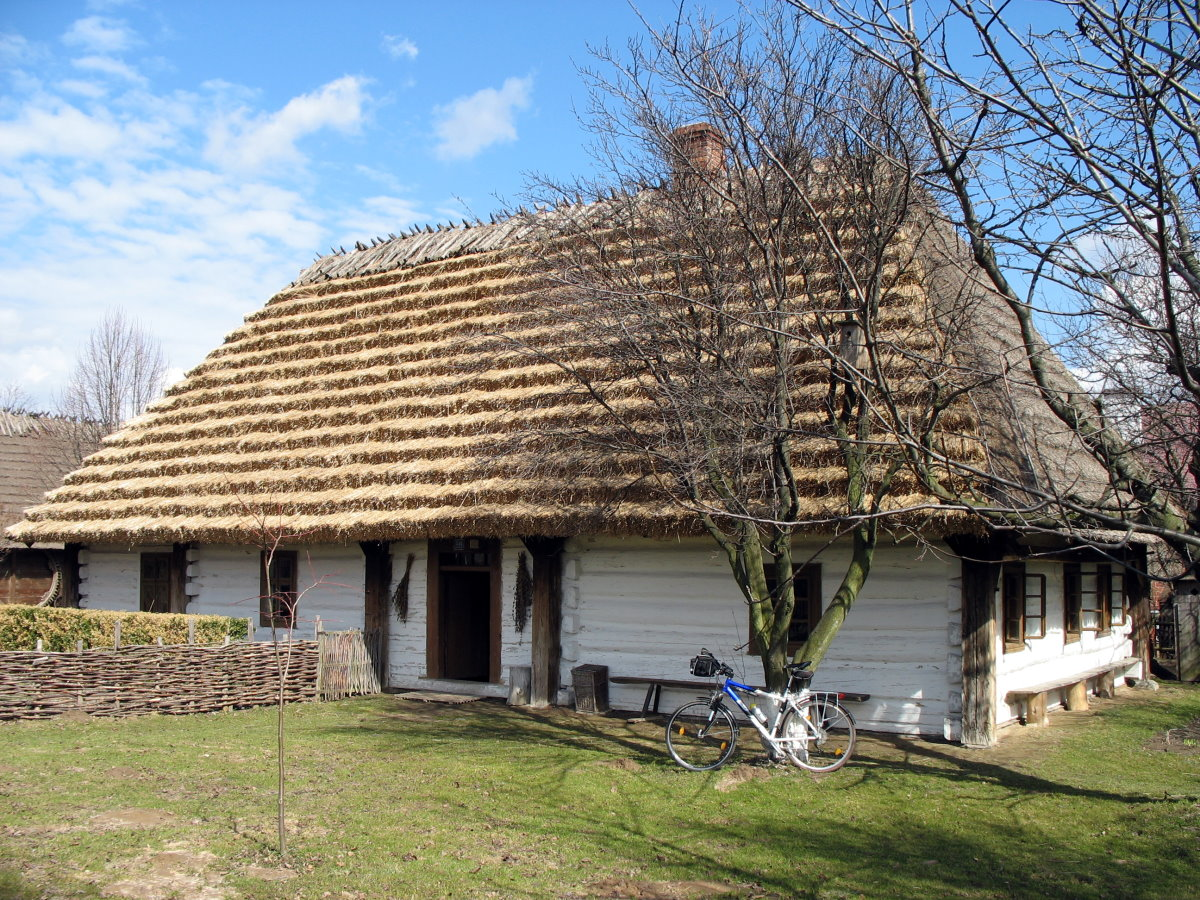
The village of Markowa. The typical Umgebindehaus – houses, about 150–200 km southeast of Kraków, around 18/19th century, built in the style of ancient mountain Walddeutsche atmosphere.

While during 1772–1918 it belonged to Austrian empire, later Austrian-Hungarian empire when double monarchy was introduced in Austria. This part of Poland was controlled by Austria for almost 120 years. At that time the area (including west and east of Subcarpathian Voivodeship) was known as Galicia.

The line of the river Dunajec and that of the San, both in West Galicia, marked the two successive stages in the break-through battle which initiated the Austro-German offensive of 1915 on the eastern front. An attempt to stand on the line of the Wisłok river and the Łupków Pass failed before renewed Austro-German attacks on 8 May 1915. Wisłok Valley was one of the strategically important Carpathian rivers bitterly contested in battles on the Eastern Front of World War I during the winter of 1914–1915.

== Geography ==
Towns and townships:

- Besko
- Haczów
- Krościenko Wyżne
- Krosno
- Wojaszowka
- Frysztak
- Wiśniowa
- Strzyżów
- Czudec
- Boguchwała
- Rzeszów
- Czarna
- Białobrzegi
- Tryncza

The main tributaries:

- Surowica
- Morawa
- Lubatówka
- Izwor
- Pielnica
- Stobnica
- Mleczka
- Mikośka
- Strug

== See also ==
- Rivers of Poland

== Literature ==
- Prof. Adam Fastnacht. Slownik Historyczno-Geograficzny Ziemi Sanockiej w Średniowieczu (Historic-Geographic Dictionary of the Sanok District in the Middle Ages), Kraków, 2002, ISBN 83-88385-14-3.
