= Bukowsko–Nowotaniec wind farm =

Wind farm in Poland

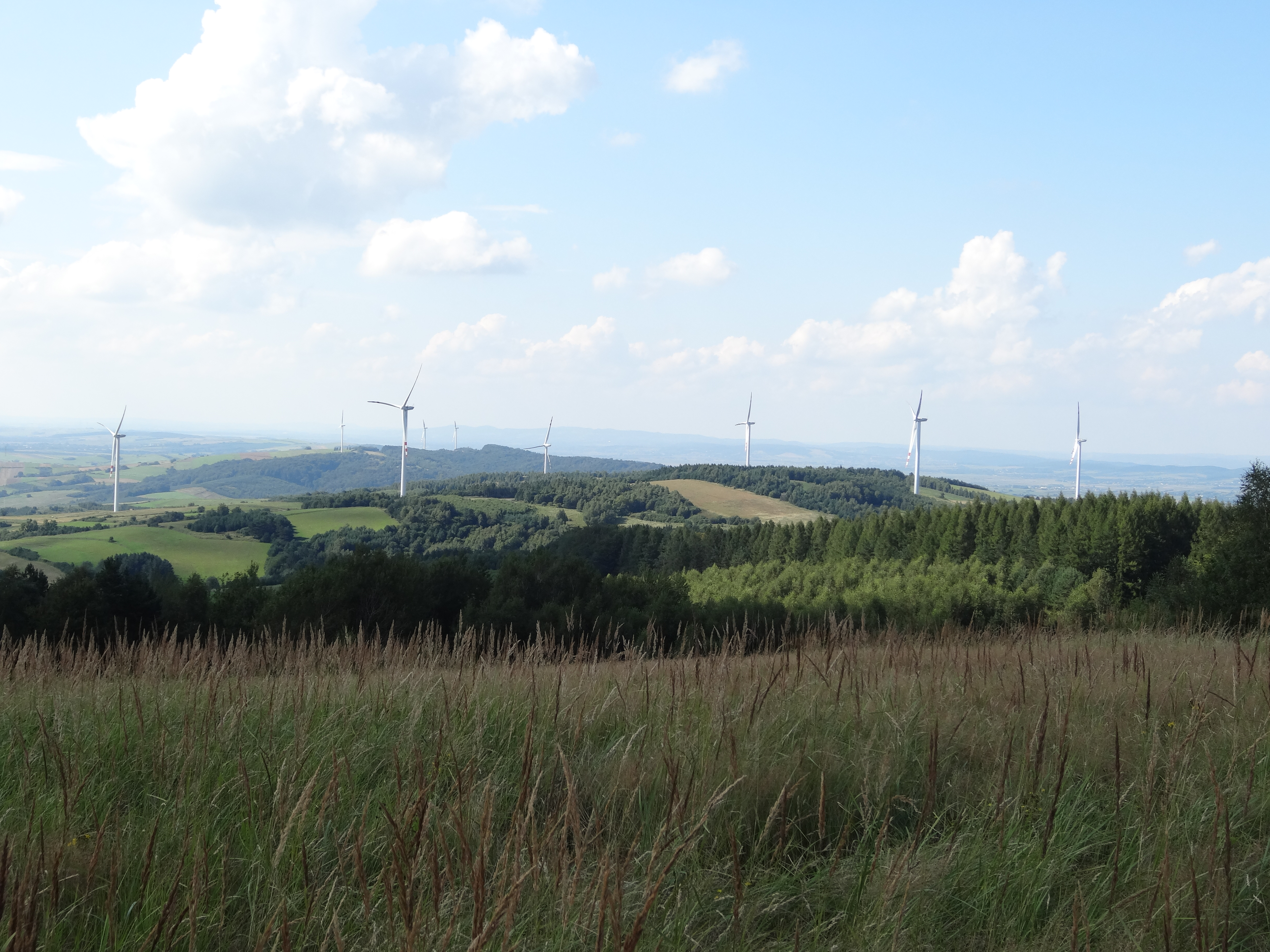
- Country: Poland
- Coordinates: 49°28′57″N 22°05′16″E

External links
- Commons: Related media on Commons

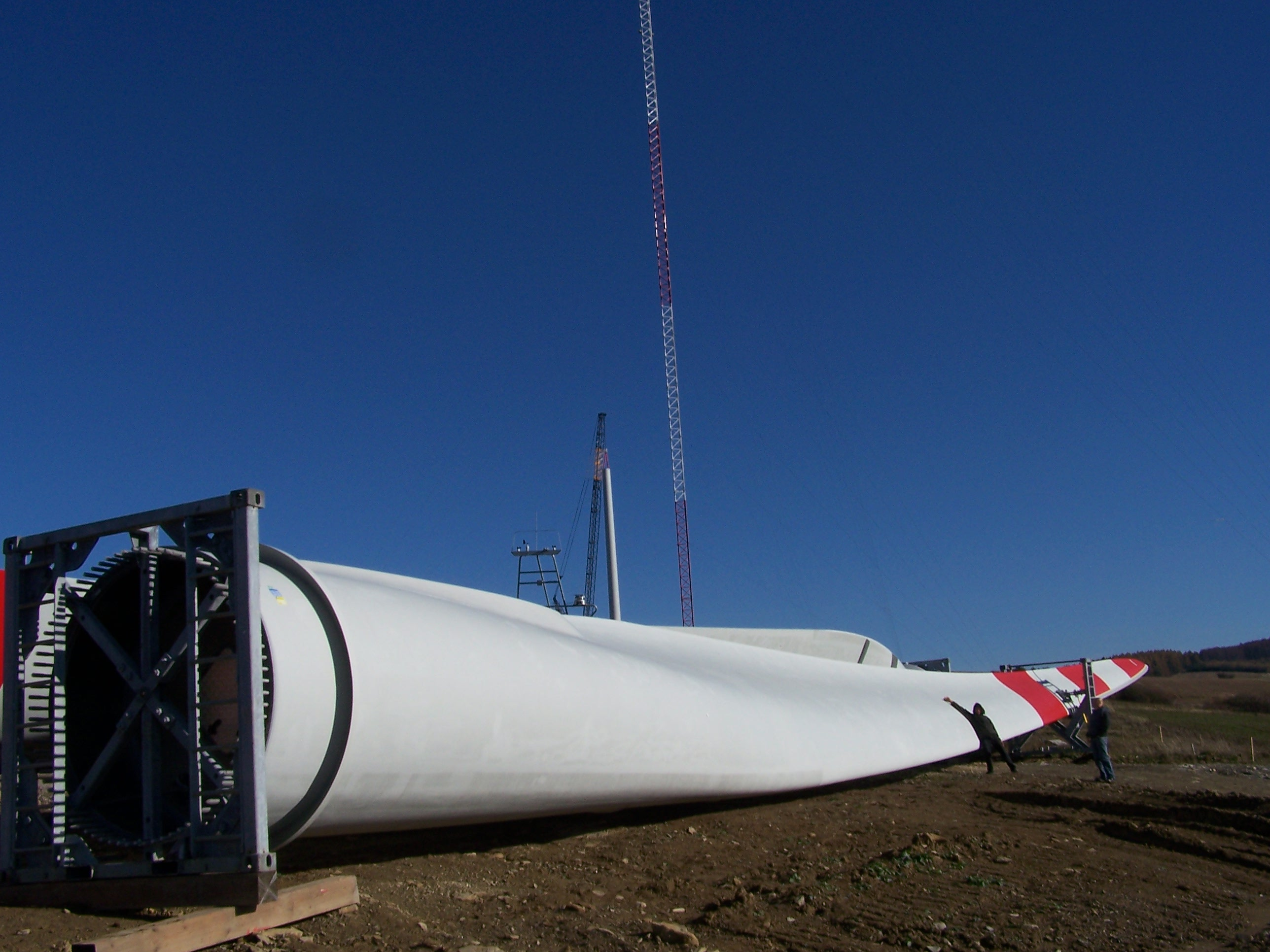
Wind rotor blade REpower, Bukowsko 2010

The Bukowsko–Nowotaniec wind farm south of village Bukowsko, Poland, is the second wind-farm project planned by Martifer Renewables and REpower in Poland. The project "Bukowsko" comprises eight REpower MM92 turbines, each with a rated output of 2 megawatts (MW). This is the first wind-farm project undertaken in Poland by Germany's third-largest wind-turbine manufacturer. The projects is located in the south-east of the Sanok county
