= Nadolany =

Nadolany Nadolany
- village
- Location within Poland
- Coordinates: 49°30′55″N 22°01′54″E
- Country: Poland
- Voivodeship: Subcarpathian
- County: Sanok
- Gmina: Bukowsko
- Founded: 1446

Area
  - Total: 6.8 km^{2} (2.6 sq mi)
- Elevation: 270 m (890 ft)

Population
  - Total: 600
- Time zone: UTC+1 (CET)
  - Summer (DST): UTC+2 (CEST)
- Postal code: 38507

Nadolany [nadɔˈlanɨ] is a village in East Małopolska in the Lesser Beskid mountains, Bukowsko rural commune, parish in Nowotaniec.

Nadolany is about 10 miles from Sanok in southeast Poland. It is situated below the main watershed at the foot of the Słonne Mountain, and has an elevation of 340 metres. Situated in the Subcarpathian Voivodship (since 1999), previously in Krosno Voivodship (1975-1998) and Sanok district, (10 miles east of Sanok).

== History ==
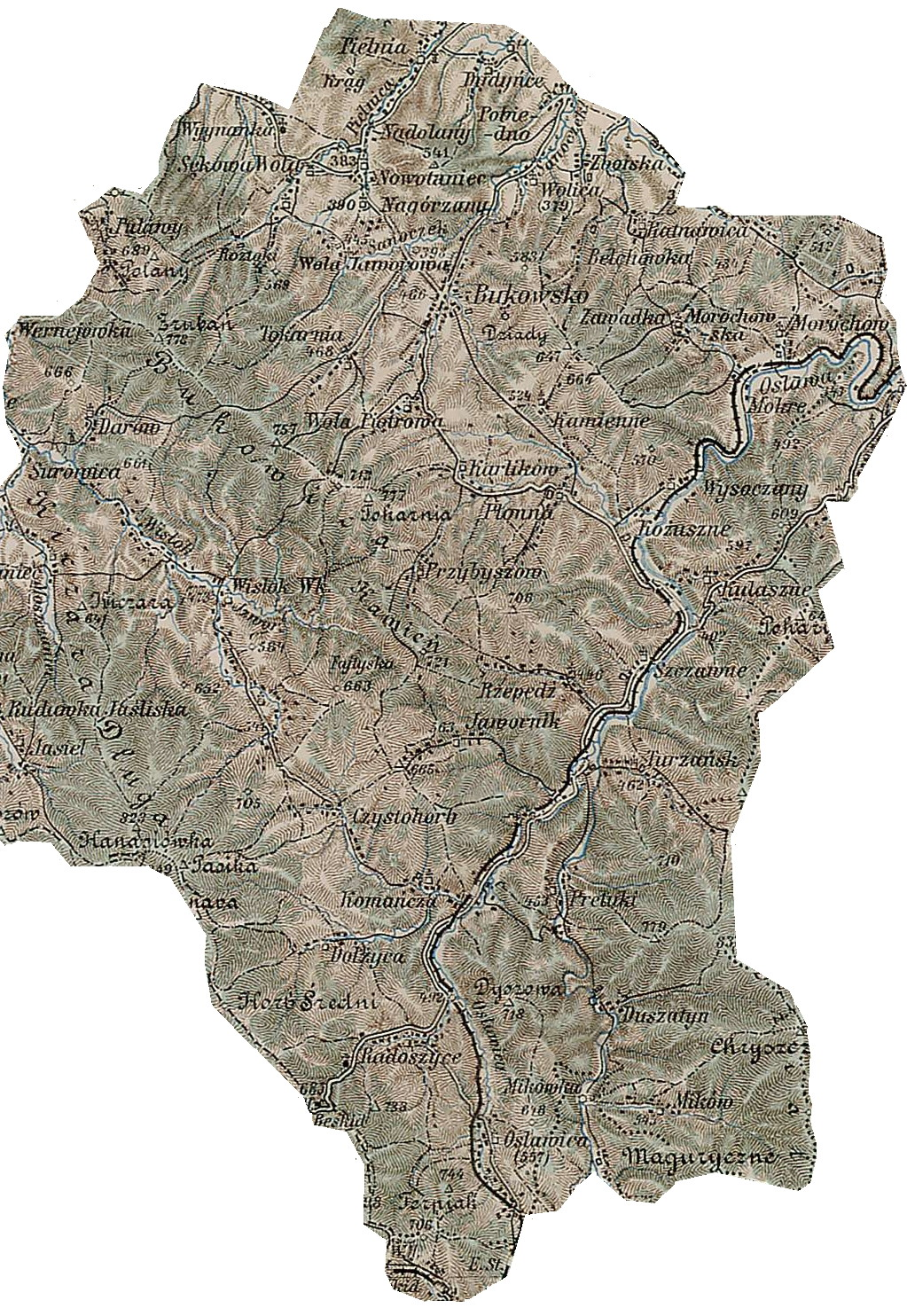
Gerichts-Bezirk Bukowsko bis 1918, Bukowsko Rural Commune. An 1898 map shows the location of Nadolany (click in it to enlarge)

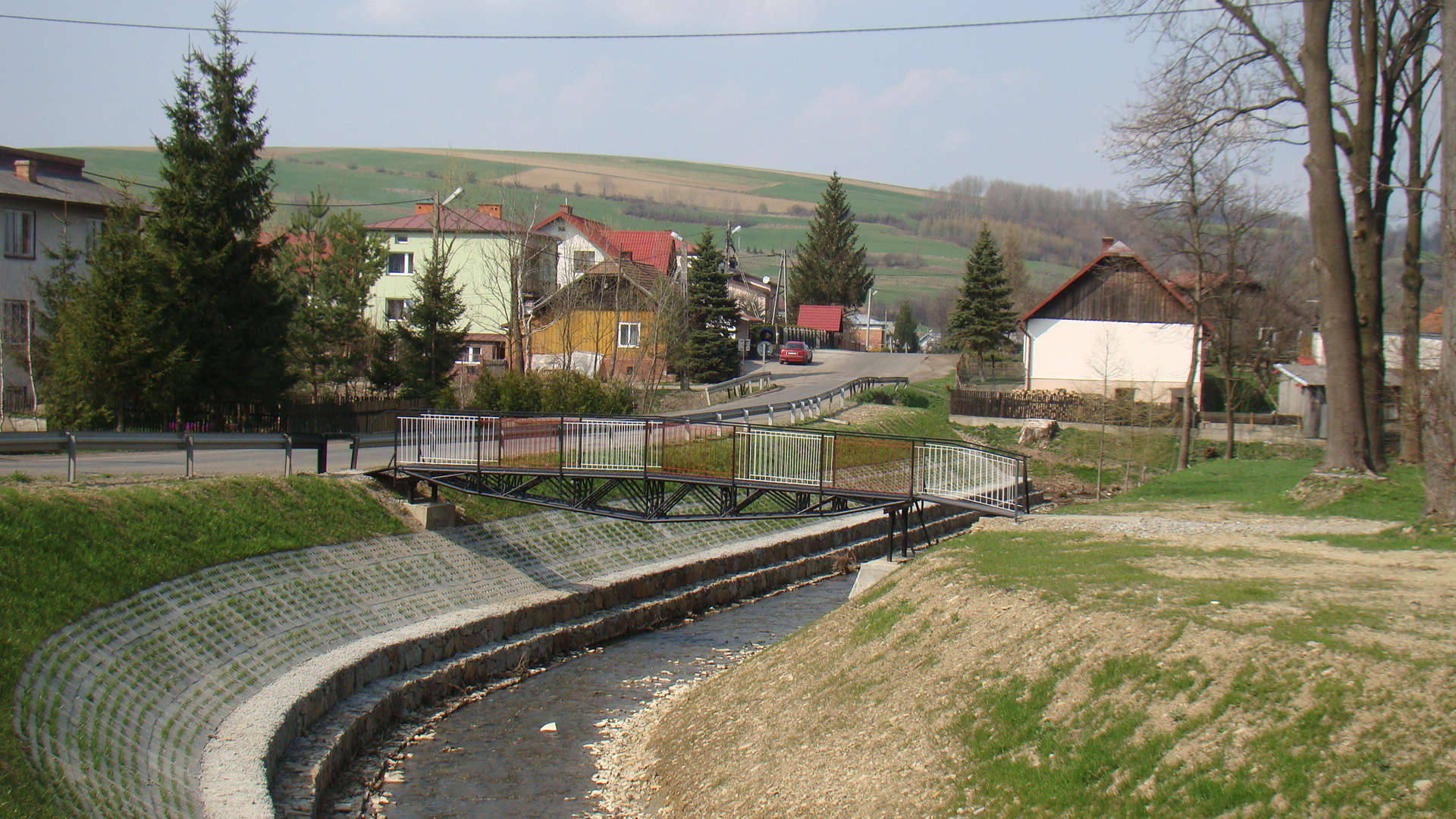
Nadony

Nadolany was founded in 1446 by Bals family. From 966 to 1018, 1340-1772 (Ruthenian Voivodeship, Sanoker County) and during 1918-1939 Nadolany was part of Poland. While during 1772-1918 it belonged to Austrian empire, later Austrian-Hungarian empire when double monarchy was introduced in Austria. This part of Poland was controlled by Austria for almost 120 years. At that time the area (including west and east of Subcarpathian Voivodship) was known as Galicia since 1772. In 1785 the village lands comprised 6 ½ lans.

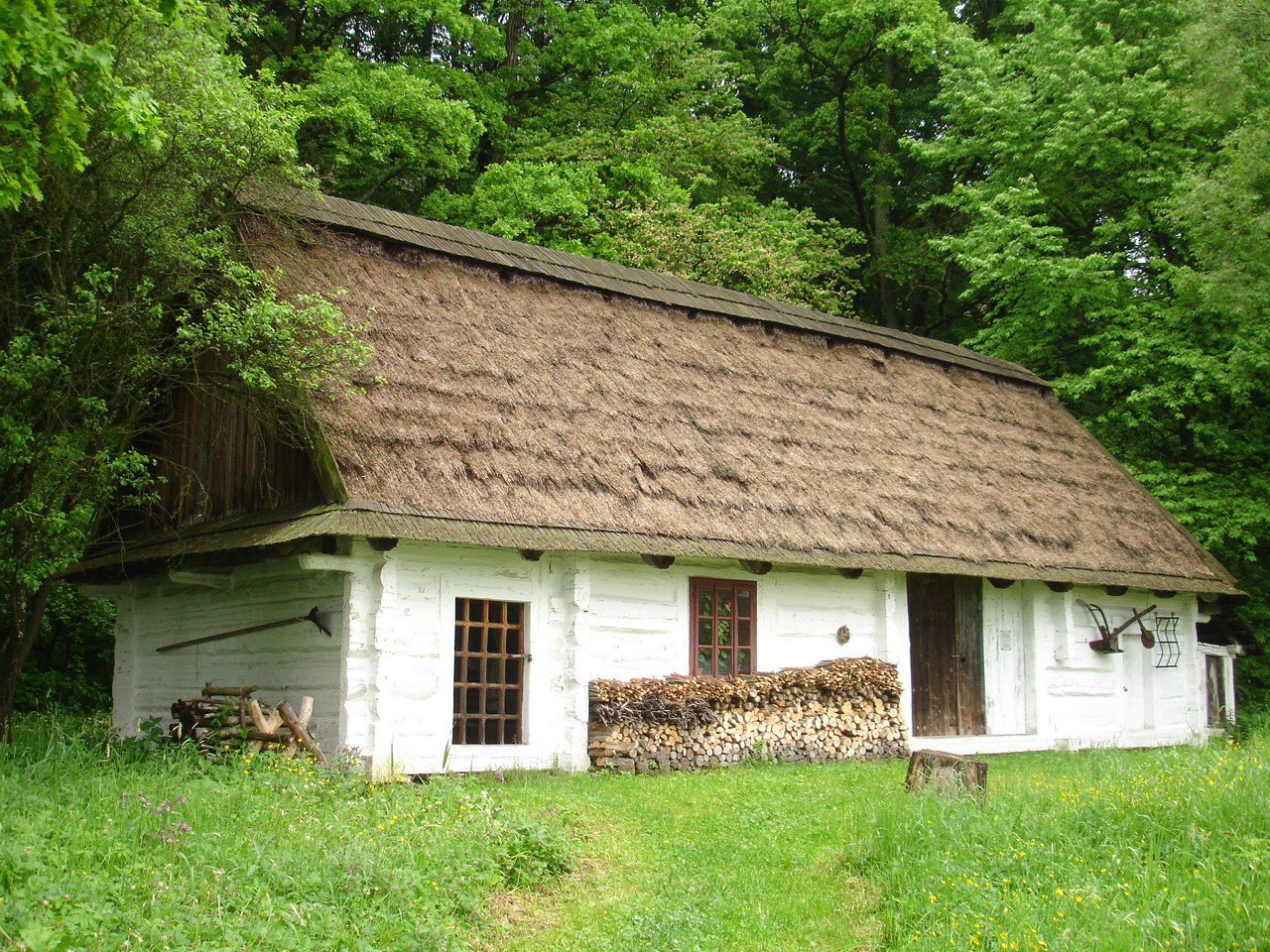
a hut from Nadolany, 1892

== Literature ==
- Adam Fastnacht, Nagórzany [in:] Slownik Historyczno-Geograficzny Ziemi Sanockiej w Średniowieczu (Historic-Geographic Dictionary of the Sanok District in the Middle Ages), Kraków, (II edition 2002), ISBN 83-88385-14-3.
- Jerzy Zuba "W Gminie Bukowsko". Roksana, 2004, ISBN 83-7343-150-0. Translated by Deborah Greenlee. Arlington, TX 76016.
