= Poźniak coat of arms =

Polish coat of arms

Poźniak
- Alternative name: Przestrzal
- Earliest mention: unknown
- Towns: none
- Families: 6 surnames altogether: Apoznański, Poslewicz, Poślewicz, Poźniak, Poźniakowski, Pracki

Poźniak or Przestrzał is a Polish coat of arms.

== Gallery ==
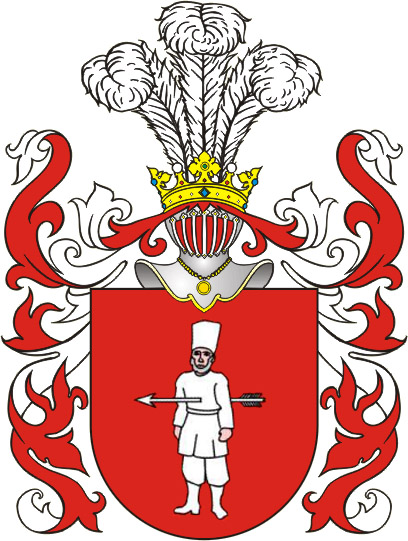

== See also ==
- Polish heraldry
- Heraldic family
- List of Polish nobility coats of arms

== Bibliography ==
- Księga herbowa rodów polskich, Tom 1. str. 516-517, Tom 2. str. 309, Juliusz Karol Ostrowski, Warszawa 1897
