= Besko =

- Village
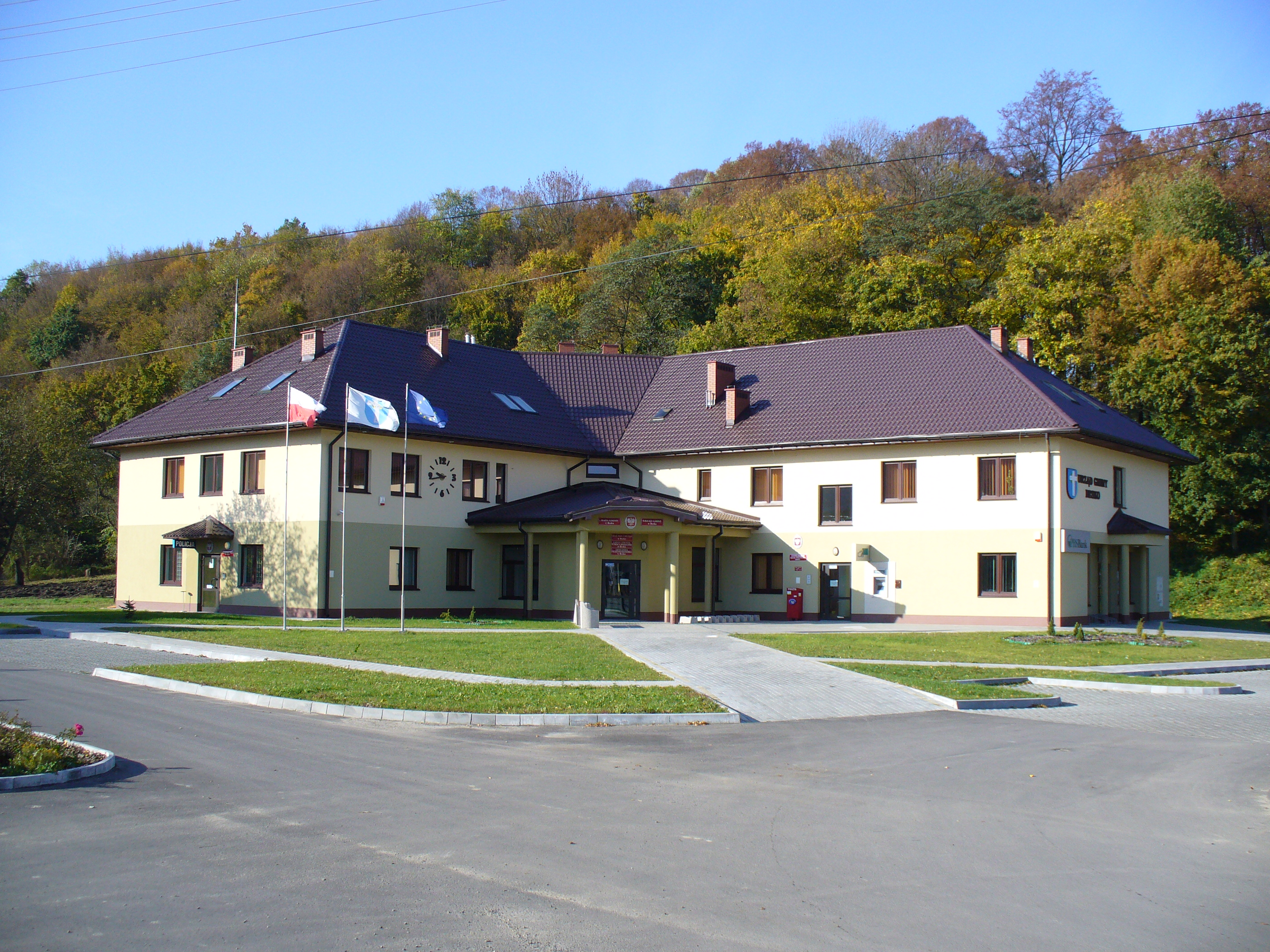
- Municipal office

- Coat of arms

- Location within Poland
- Coordinates: 49°35′N 21°57′E
- Country: Poland
- Voivodeship: Subcarpathian
- County: Sanok
- Gmina: Besko
- Population: 3,700
- Website: http://www.besko.pl

Besko [ˈbɛskɔ] is a village in Sanok County, Subcarpathian Voivodeship, in south-eastern Poland. It is the seat of the gmina (administrative district) called Gmina Besko.

== History ==
As a result of the first of Partitions of Poland (Treaty of St-Petersburg dated 5 July 1772, the Galicia area was attributed to the Habsburg Monarchy. When a postoffice was opened in 1890, the town was in the Sanok Bezirkshauptmannschaft.

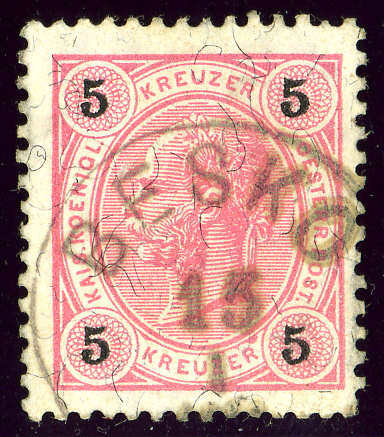
Austrian KK stamp 1890 issue, cancelled in Besko

For more details, see the article Kingdom of Galicia and Lodomeria.
