= Medzilaborce =

- Municipality
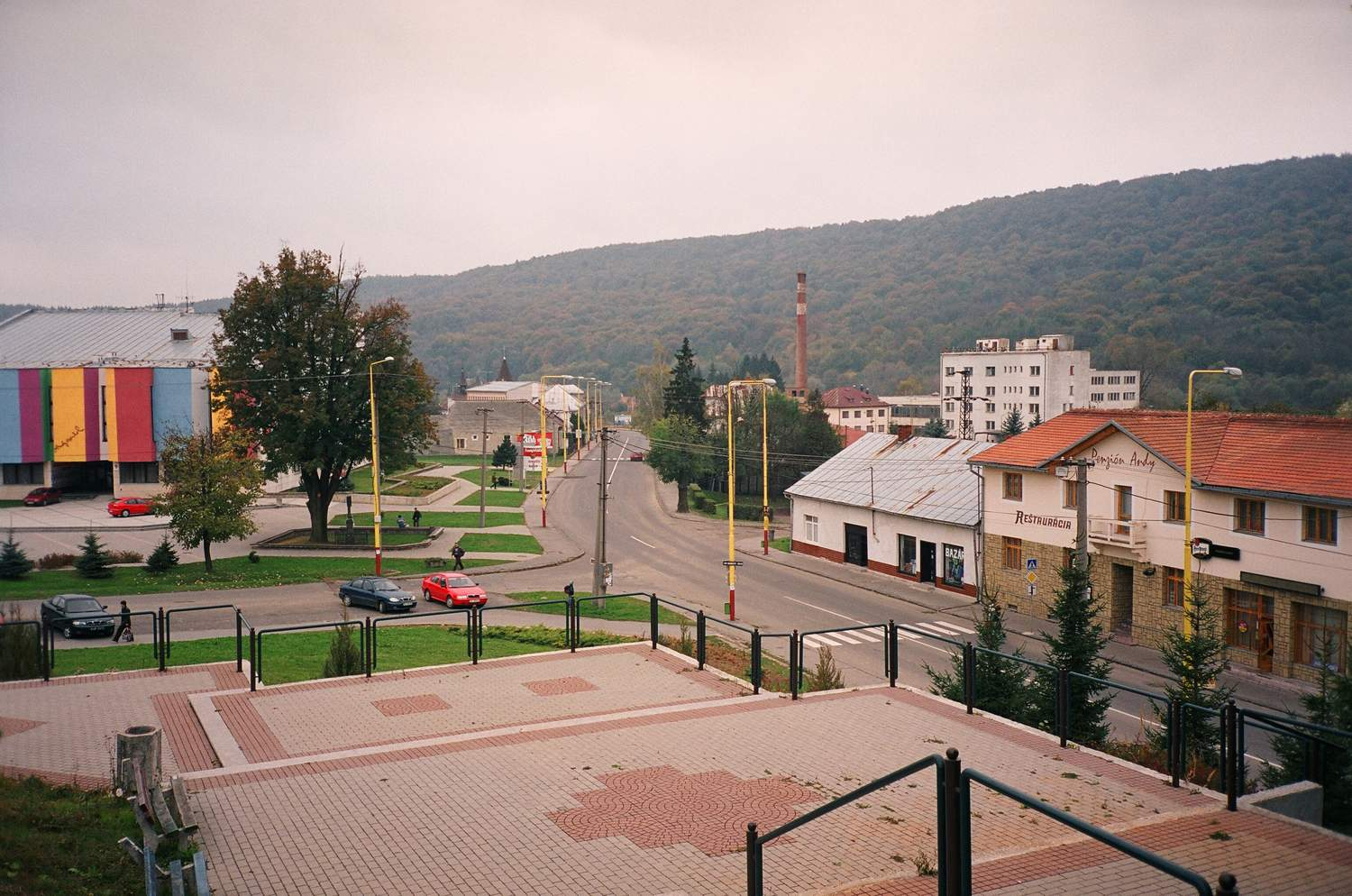
- Medzilaborce main street

- Flag Coat of arms
- Etymology: "people amidst the Laborec streams"
- Location of Medzilaborce in the Prešov Region Location of Medzilaborce in Slovakia
- Coordinates: 49.27°N 21.90°E
- Country: Slovakia
- Region: Prešov Region
- District: Medzilaborce District
- First mentioned: 1557

Government
  - Mayor: Vladislav Višňovský

Area
  - Total: 47.48 km^{2} (18.33 sq mi)
- Elevation: 342 m (1,122 ft)

Population (2025)
  - Total: 5,669
- Time zone: UTC+1 (CET)
  - Summer (DST): UTC+2 (CEST)
- Postal code: 680 1
- Area code: +421 57
- Vehicle registration plate (until 2022): ML
- Website: www.medzilaborce-urad.sk

Medzilaborce (Rusyn: Міджілабірцї, Midzhilabirtsyi; Ukrainian: Міжлабірці, Mizhlabirtsi; Hungarian: Mezőlaborc) is a town in northeastern Slovakia close to the border with Poland, located near the towns of Sanok and Bukowsko (in southeastern Małopolska). Its population is approximately 6,500.

== Characteristics ==
It is an administrative and cultural centre of the Laborec Region. A train line connects it with the town of Humenné to the south and with Poland to the north. The private sector and service industries are developing quickly in the town at the moment.

It is home to the Andy Warhol Museum of Modern Art, opened in 1991, which contains many artworks and effects of Andy Warhol, his brother Paul and nephew James Warhola. Warhol's mother, Julia Warhola, was born and lived with her husband in the village of Mikó (today Miková), 17 kilometres (11 miles) to the west.

Medzilaborce is situated in one of the least developed regions of Slovakia. There are three churches in the town.

== Geography ==
The municipality lies at an altitude of 342 metres (1,122 ft) and covers an area of 47.48 km^{2} (18.33 sq mi) (2025).

City parts:

- Medzilaborce
- Borov
- Vydraň

The town of Medzilaborce lies in the valley of the Laborec river in north-eastern Slovakia. The hills of the surrounding Laborec Highlands are typical of this countryside.

== History ==
The oldest written record connected with Medzilaborce dates back to 1543. The village first belonged to the Drugeth family, but passed to the Csáky family in the 17th century and later in the 19th century to the Andrássy family manor. As early as the 17th century, an important trade route passed through Medzilaborce connecting the interior of Slovakia with Poland through the Lupkov Pass. Medzilaborce became a town in 1860. In 1873, construction of the train track between Homonna (present-day Humenné) and Medzilaborce and further on to Galicia via the Lupkov Pass, which contributed to the growth of the town from 724 inhabitants in 1851 to 1561 citizens in 1910. During World War I, Russian troops entered the town in February 1915 and stayed there until May 1915, leaving the town significantly damaged. Before the establishment of independent Czechoslovakia in 1918, it was part of Zemplén County within the Kingdom of Hungary. In 1918 the town became part of Czechoslovakia. During the first Czechoslovak republic, there was massive unemployment, and many people emigrated from the town. From 1939 to 1944, Medzilaborce was part of the Slovak Republic. The town was significantly damaged again during World War II, when 30% of the population of the city, consisting of Jewish Slovaks, were executed or sent to concentration camps. On 26 November 1944, the Red Army and the 1st Czechoslovak Army Corps dislodged the Wehrmacht from Medzilaborce and it was once again part of Czechoslovakia. It was the seat of the district until 1960, when it was merged with the Humenné district. It has again been the seat of the Medzilaborce district since 1996.

== Population ==
Historical population
Year	Pop.	±%
1970	4,426	—
1980	5,533	+25.0%
1991	6,391	+15.5%
2001	6,741	+5.5%
2011	6,809	+1.0%
2021	5,965	−12.4%
Source: Censuses

Population statistic (10 years)
Year	1995	2005	2015	2025
Count	6694	6659	6639	5669
Difference		−0.52%	−0.30%	−14.61%

Population statistic
Year	2024	2025
Count	5723	5669
Difference		−0.94%

It has a population of 5669 people (31 December 2025).

In 1910 the town had 1,561 inhabitants, 677 Ruthenian, 501 German and 255 Hungarian. More than one third of the population (34.3%) were Jewish. The town had a high percentage of Rusyns before World War II.

=== Ethnicity ===
Census 2021 (1+ %)
Ethnicity	Number	Fraction
Slovak	3796	63.63%
Rusyn	2833	47.49%
Not found out	491	8.23%
Romani	426	7.14%
Ukrainian	171	2.86%
Total	5965	

In year 2021 was 5965 people by ethnicity 3796 as Slovak, 2833 as Rusyn, 491 as Not found out, 426 as Romani, 171 as Ukrainian, 45 as Czech, 14 as Hungarian, 12 as Russian, 9 as Other, 8 as Polish, 6 as Vietnamese, 3 as Bulgarian, 2 as English, 1 as Italian, 1 as Romanian, 1 as Austrian, 1 as German, 1 as Moravian and 1 as Greek.

Note on population: The difference values of population numbers in the table "Population statistic" and in the sections "Ethnicity" & "Religion" is caused by the use of various statistical methods.

=== Religion ===
Census 2021 (1+ %)
Religion	Number	Fraction
Greek Catholic Church	2199	36.87%
Eastern Orthodox Church	2102	35.24%
Roman Catholic Church	570	9.56%
None	484	8.11%
Not found out	467	7.83%
Jehovah's Witnesses	68	1.14%
Total	5965	

In year 2021 was 5965 people by religion 2199 from Greek Catholic Church, 2102 from Eastern Orthodox Church, 570 from Roman Catholic Church, 484 from None, 467 from Not found out, 68 from Jehovah's Witnesses, 29 from Evangelical Church, 9 from Other, 8 from Other and not ascertained christian church, 7 from Ad hoc movements, 6 from Church of the Brethren, 5 from Seventh-day Adventist Church, 4 from Buddhism, 3 from Calvinist Church, 1 from Old Catholic Church, 1 from Christian Congregations in Slovakia, 1 from United Methodist Church and 1 from Apostolic Church.

== Economy and infrastructure ==
Glass and machinery industry have the largest tradition in town Medzilaborce.

From 1970s it had been a branch of Jablonecke sklarne which had employ approximately 600 people in the glass industry. Company has stop its operations after privatization. Glass LPS has been now a follower of 45 years old tradition in glass industry in Medzilaborce and still manufacture crystal chandeliers and grind crystal trimmings.

In machinery industry in Medzilaborce it was Transporta, later Vihorlat which had 1200 employees. Privatization and crises had destroyed the whole factory. Nowadays companies Kovostroj and Labstroj continue in machinery industry.

=== Major employers ===
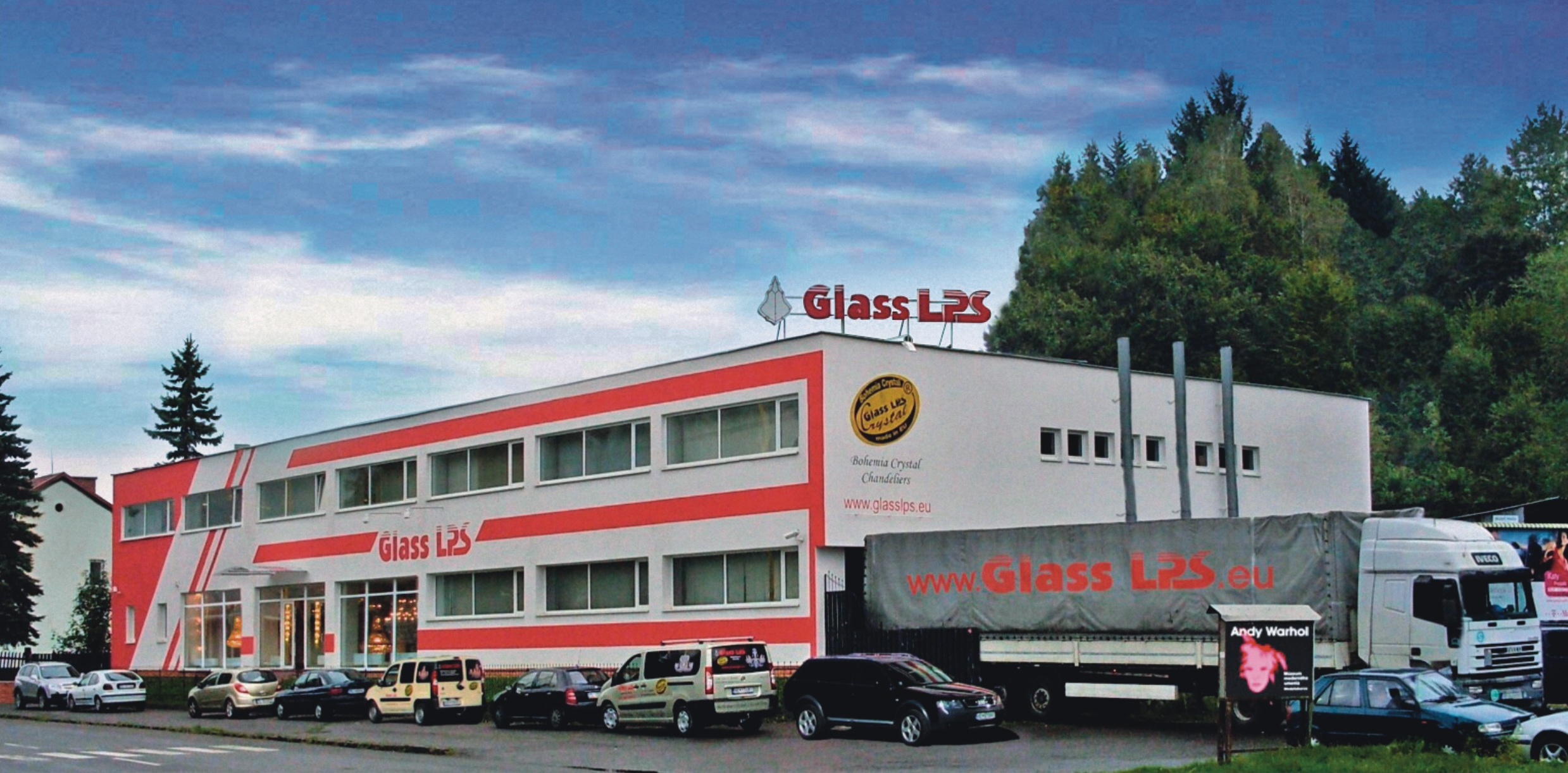
Glass LPS - producer of crystal chandeliers.

- Glass LPS Ltd.
- Kovostroj Inc.
- Labstroj Ltd.

== Twin towns — sister cities ==
Medzilaborce is twinned with:

- Náměšť nad Oslavou, Czech Republic
- Kozienice, Poland

== Notable people ==
- Adam Žulevič (born 2007)- footballer

== Gallery ==
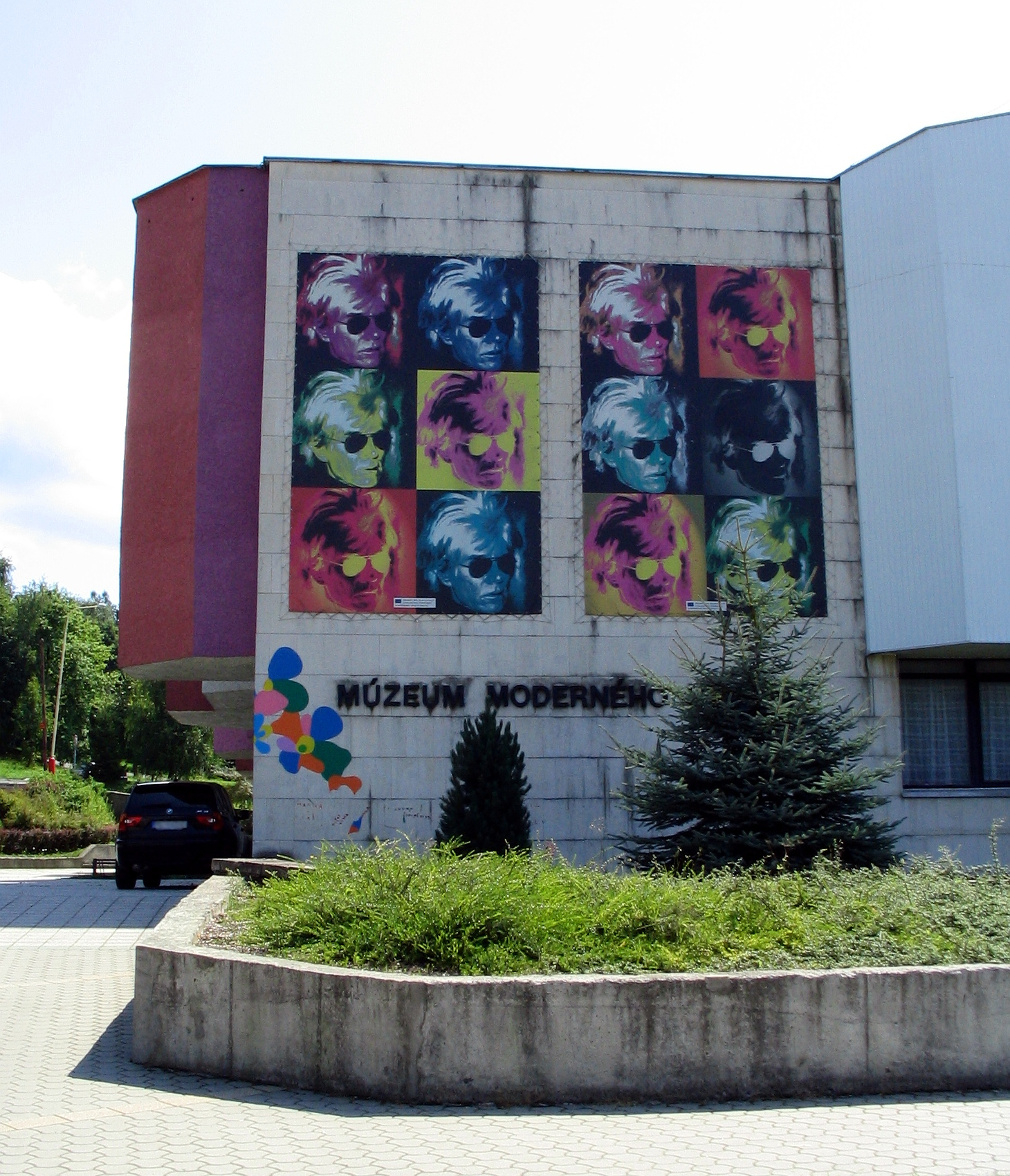
The Andy Warhol Museum of Modern Art

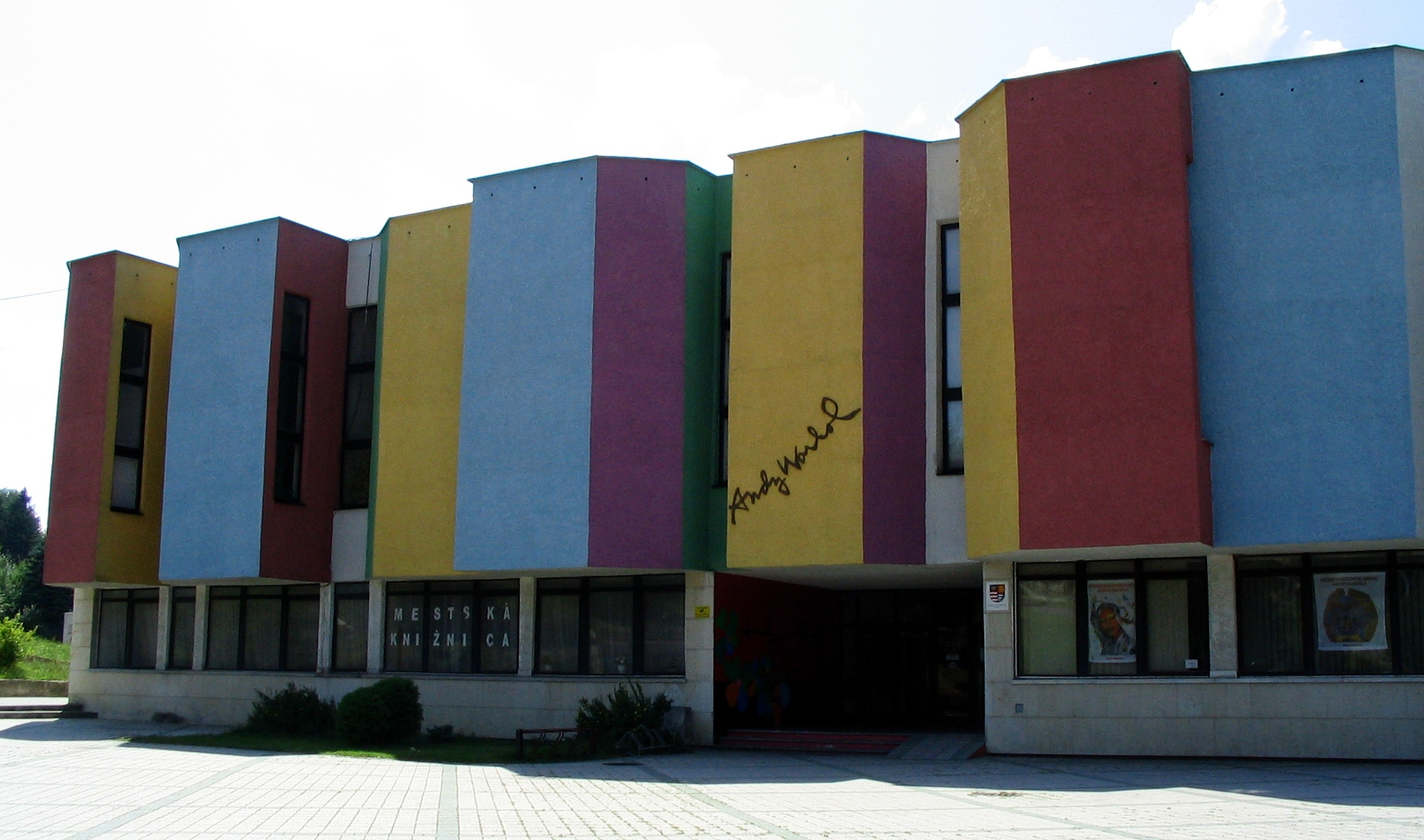
The Andy Warhol Museum of Modern Art

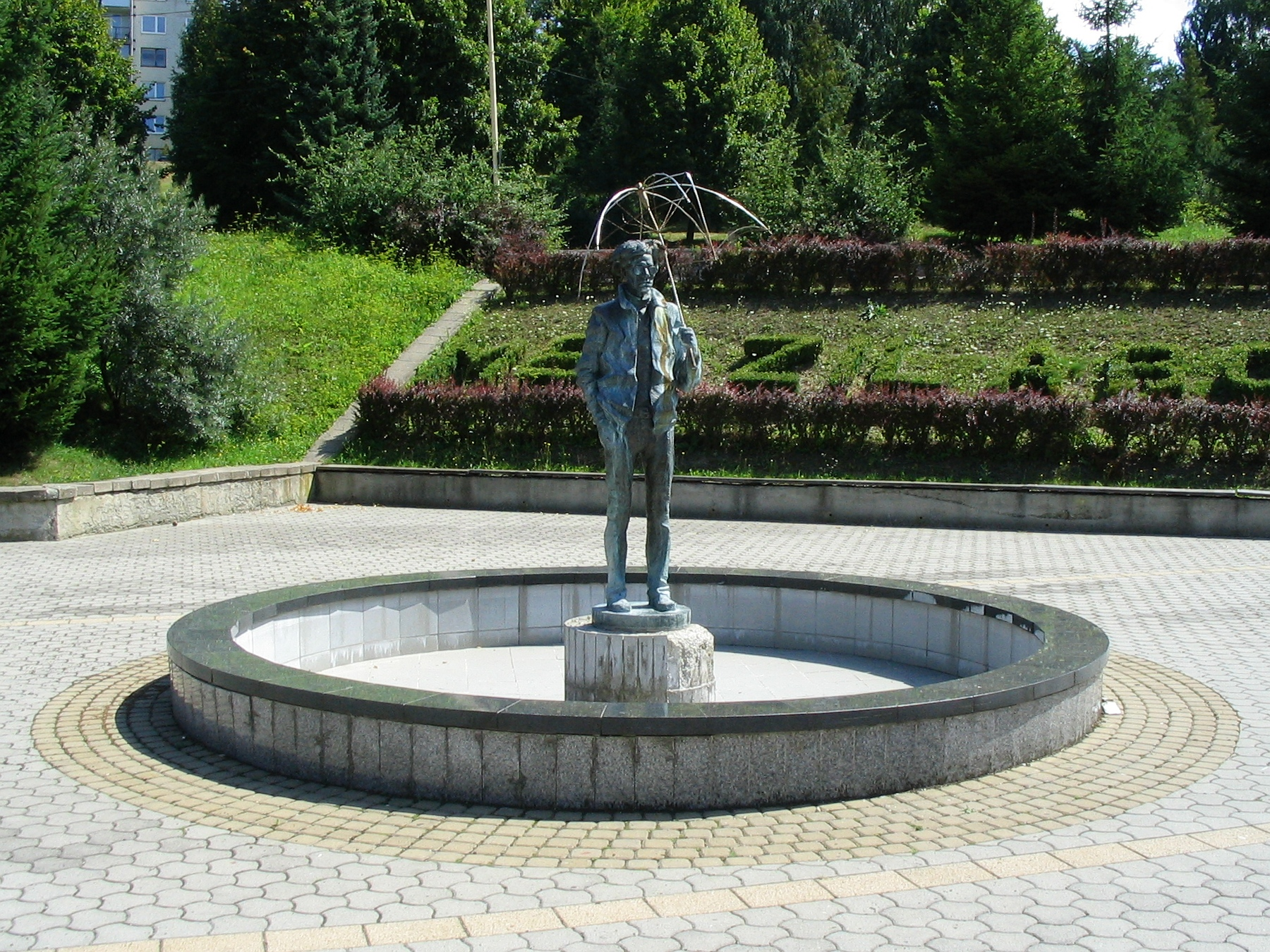
Statue of Andy Warhol

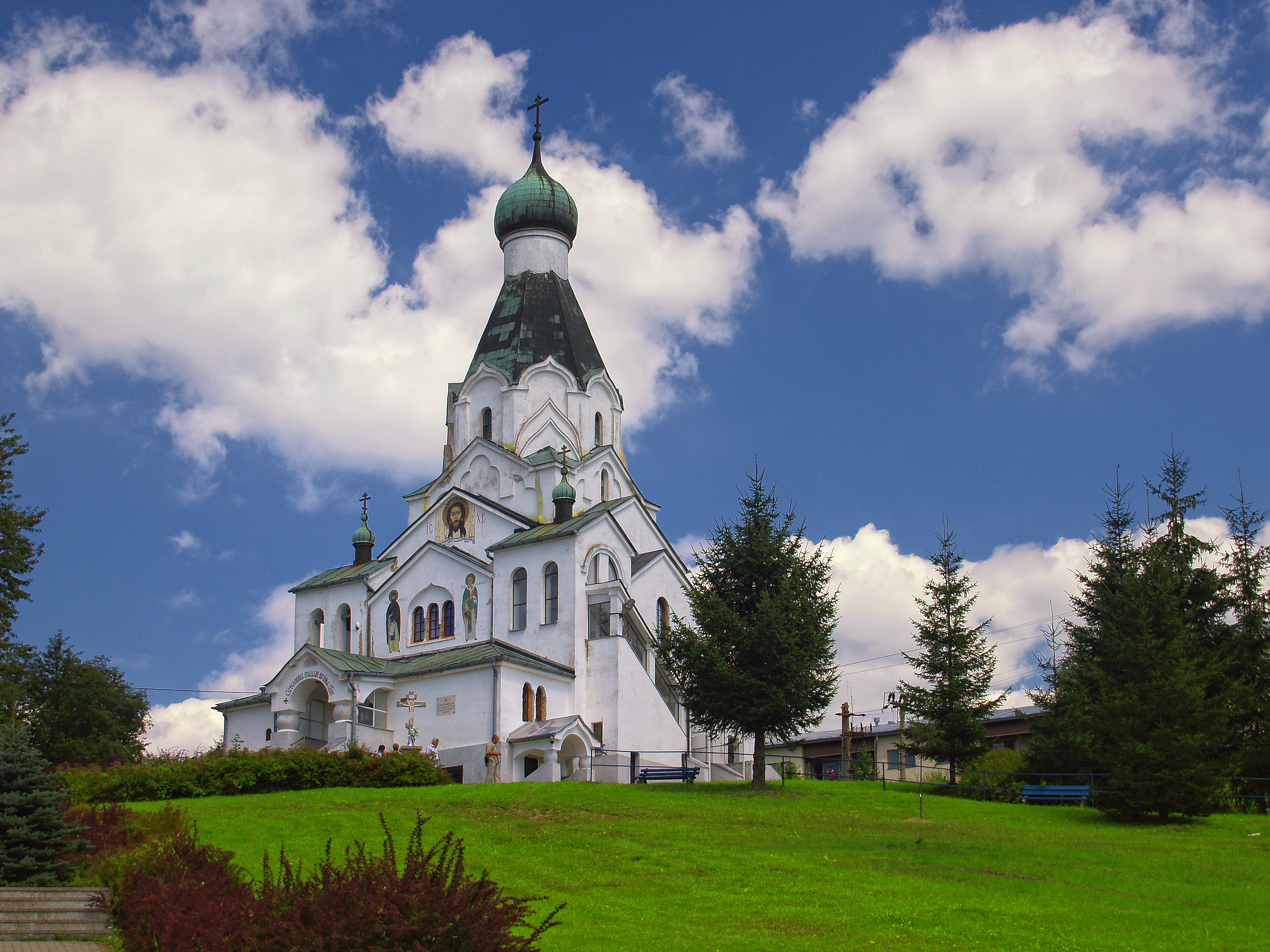
Orthodox church in the center of Medzilaborce
