= Komańcza Republic =

1918–1919 Lemko microstate in Europe

Komancza Republic Команчанська Республіка
- 1918–1919
- Flag

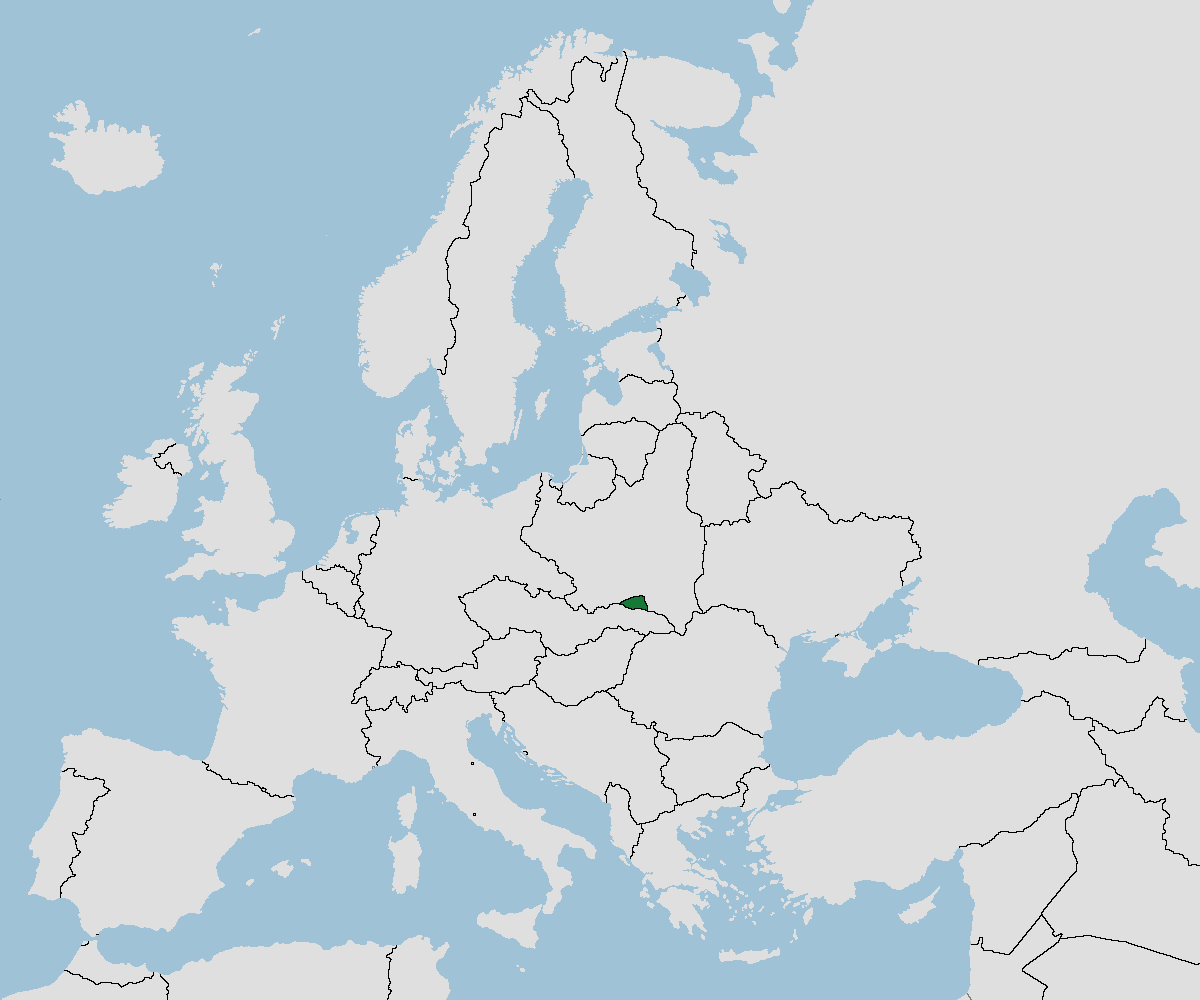
- Capital: Komańcza, Wisłok Wielki (de facto)
- Common languages: Ukrainian
- Government: Republic
- Head of the Council
  - 1918–1919: Panteleymon Shpylka
- Historical era: World War I
  - Established: 4 November 1918
  - Disestablished: 24 January 1919

Population
  - 1919: circa 18,000
Preceded by	Succeeded by
Austria-Hungary	Second Polish Republic
- Today part of: Poland; Slovakia; Ukraine

The Komańcza Republic, (Note: Ukrainian: Команча́нська Респу́бліка) also known as the Eastern Lemko Republic, (Note: Ukrainian and Rusyn: Східно-Ле́мківська Респу́бліка) Vyslik Republic, (Note: Ukrainian and Rusyn: Ви́слоцька Респу́бліка) Wisłok Republic and Lemko Republic, (Note: Ukrainian and Rusyn: Лемківська Република) was a short-lived self-governing polity consisting of 33 Lemko villages centered on Komańcza in the eastern Lemko Region. It existed between 4 November 1918 and 24 January 1919.

The republic was led by the Reverend Panteleymon Shpylka, who served as head of the County Ukrainian National Council (Ukrainian: голова Повітової Української Національної Ради).

Unlike the contemporaneous Lemko Republic to its west (which sought unification with a restored, non-Bolshevik Russian Republic), the Komancza Republic planned to unite with the West Ukrainian People's Republic in an independent Ukrainian state. However, this was suppressed by the Polish government as part of the Polish–Ukrainian War.

The Treaty of Saint-Germain made Galicia west of the San river, Polish.

== History ==
After Dissolution of Austria-Hungary on western Ukraine first outbreaks of the liberation struggle appeared. Due to the fact that in Sanok it was impossible to establish a povit UNR, because the Polish army was stationed there, decided to create a Rada Sanoksky povit in Vyslok, which became the center of the national liberation struggle in Eastern Lemko.

Since November 1918 р. Parson in village Vyslik Velyky. Panteleymon Shpylka received a proclamation announcing WUPR. Together with Parson village Vyslik Nyzhny. Mykhaylom Tesleyu and teacher Hrytsem Sudomyrom they decided to convene the next day peasant council in local school.

On november 4 to school arrived 70 delegates from villages Vyslik Velyky, Komańcza, Polavshy, Surowiczne, Darów, Szczawne, Przybyszów. To mentioned villages were joined peasant villages Baligród, Rzepedź, Turzańsk, Old Lupkiv, Dołżyca, Czystogarb, Jawornik, Kulaszne, Kalnica, Radoszyce, Osławica, Wysoczany, Karlików, Płonna, Smolnik, Sukovate, Mików, Maniów, Moszczaniec, Morochów, Balnica, Wola Michowa, Duszatyn, Prełuki, Tisna. On meeting was founded Povits Ukrainian National Council with a settlement in Vyslik Velyky, proclaimed of creation «Eastern Lemko Republic», also known in Ukrainian and Polish historiographs as «Komancza» or «Komancza Republic», because it is in the village Komanchy located main defense headquarters.

== Government ==
The board was elected from 11 persons, which was led by Panteleymon Shpylka and a peasant from Komańcza Andriy Kyra — commander police.

Povits Ukrainian National Council:

- Panteleymon Shpylka (1918—1919) — head of Rada;
- Hryts Sudomyr — Head of the Ukrainian Povits Committee.

The executive body Komanchan Republic was called «Commissariat povit Sanok in Wisłok Wielki». The head of the commissariat was tasked with creating public councils in villages, who swore allegiance to the Ukrainian Nation. To organize against the Polish front and reliably protect the borders of the proclaimed republic. Shpylka brought in 12 officers from Hungaria to Wisłoka, distributing them to six parts in villages Wisłok, Surowiczne, Komańcza, Szczawne, Kulaszne, Rzepedź. Judge Ivan Kutsila settled all legal cases on behalf of West Ukrainian People's Republic.

The executive body included:

- Teodor Shpylka;
- Hryts Sudomyr;
- judge Ivan Kutsila;
- Povits commander police Andriy Kyra — former Austrian lieutenant colonel.

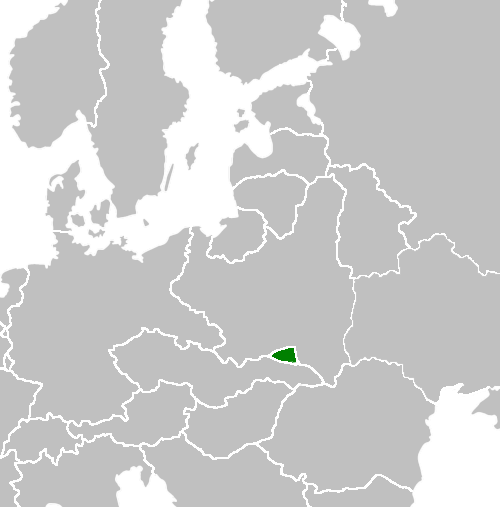
map of the komancza republic

On December 1918 at the regular meeting of the commissioners in Vyslik, a resolution was adopted, to attach Eastern Lemko Republic to WUPR, after all representatives of the republic, which included about 30 Lemko villages with a population of almost 18-thousand, unequivocally considered themselves part of WUPR, and its own separate self-government — temporary and forced.

Attempts to obtain military assistance from Stryi and Sambir had no result. Military command Stryi did not believe in the success of the Ukrainian movement in Lemko Region, therefore did not provide Komancza Republic effective support.As the only protection for «Komanchins» they organized a police (about 800 people). In the absence of communication with the government WUPR Komancza Republic was forced to act autonomously. Tadeush Andzhey Olshanskyy drew attention to the fact that «Komanchins», looking for support in Stryi, did not try to unite with closer centers of power WUPR in Biskovychi and Baligród. According to the researcher, this fact could be based on interethnic and social factors: feeling «superiority» Lemkos towards well as the local peasants distrust of government officials in Baligród — mainly «urban lords» (in «Komancza Republic» ruled mainly by peasants and priests).

== Armed fight ==
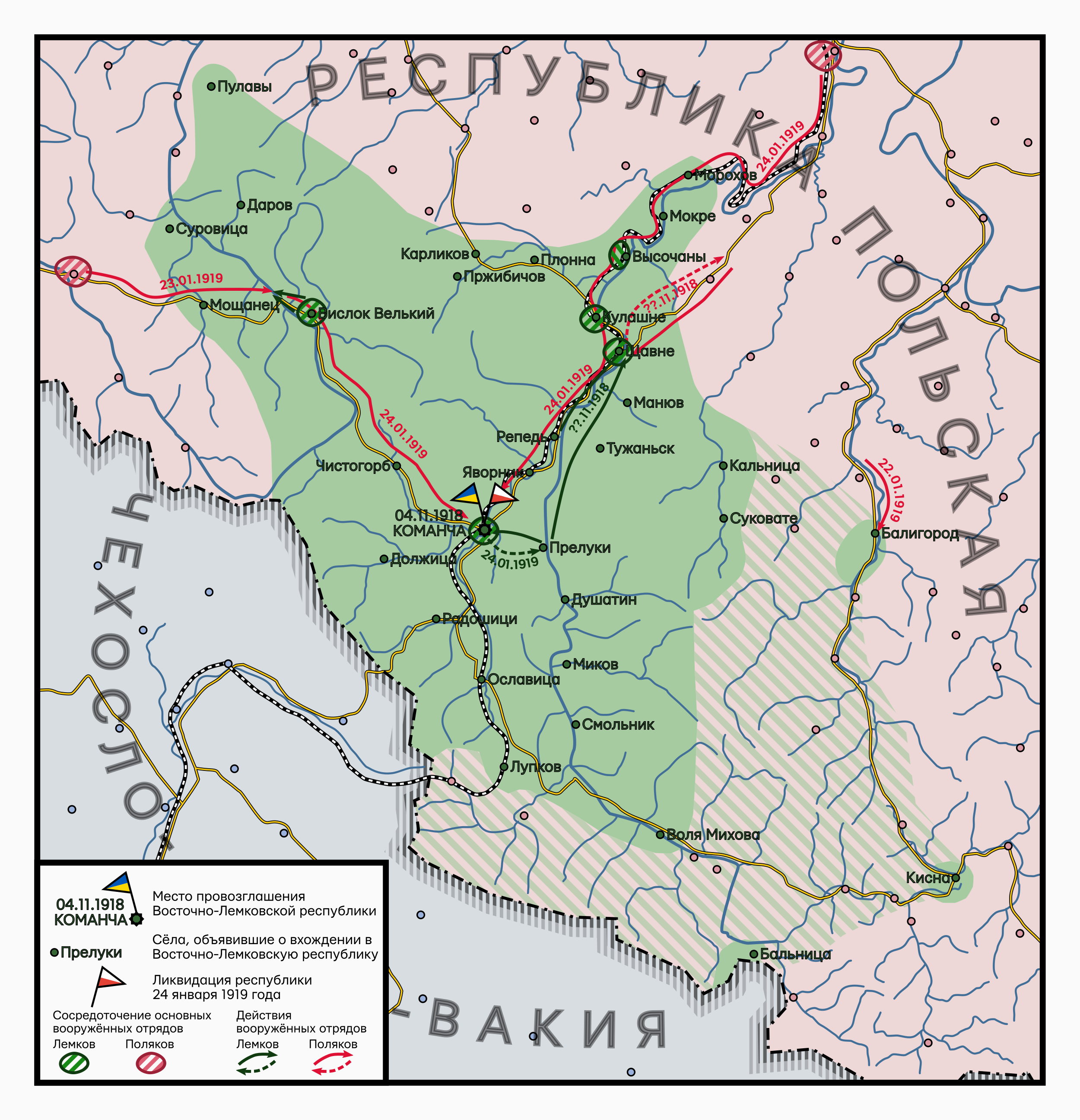
Map of the Eastern Lemko Republic and hostilities on its territory territory

Because Eastern Lemko Republic openly sought unification with Ukraine, Polish legionnaires decided to destroy it as soon as possible. They occupied Szczawne, but under pressure from the peasants Prełuki and Rzepedź this time they were forced to retreat. The legionnaires repeated their attack on Szczawne, but the peasants pushed them back to Sanok, and eight were disarmed.

On the evening of January 23, 1919 large detachment of Polish troops attacked to Vislok. After a fierce battle, the Poles won and immediately rushed to search for Shpylka, who was at that time be in village Habura on Prešov Region. For his extradition it was a reward of the amount of 5 thous. Austrian krone. Peasants died in the battle Fedir Chura, Ivan Karnafem, many were arrested. Commandant police Shchurovsky After terrible torture, Polish soldiers shot them. Board's activities have ceased.

On the morning of January 24, 1919, the Polish army captured Komańcza.

Having arisen independently November 4, 1918, having no direct connection with the Central Government WUPR, Ukrainian army, without getting any help from them, Lemko Republic lasted almost three months, until January 24, 1919.

== List of villages constituting the Republic ==
- Baligród
- Cisna
- Czystogarb
- Przybyszów
- Darów
- Karlików
- Płonna
- Jawornik
- Komańcza
- Kulaszne
- Kalnica
- Rzepedź
- Turzańsk
- Duszatyn
- Prełuki
- Maniów
- Morochów
- Moszczaniec
- Balnica
- Smolnik
- Wola Michowa
- Łupków
- Osławica
- Radoszyce
- Dołżyca
- Mików
- Surowica
- Sukowate
- Szczawne
- Wysoczany
- Mokre
- Puławy
- Wisłok Dolny
- Wisłok Górny

== See also ==
- First Republic of Pińczów
- Hutsul Republic
- Lemko Republic
- Republic of Gniew
- Republic of Ostrów
- Republic of Tarnobrzeg
- Republic of Zakopane
