= Wysoczany =

Lemko village in Poland

Wysoczany Височани
- Village
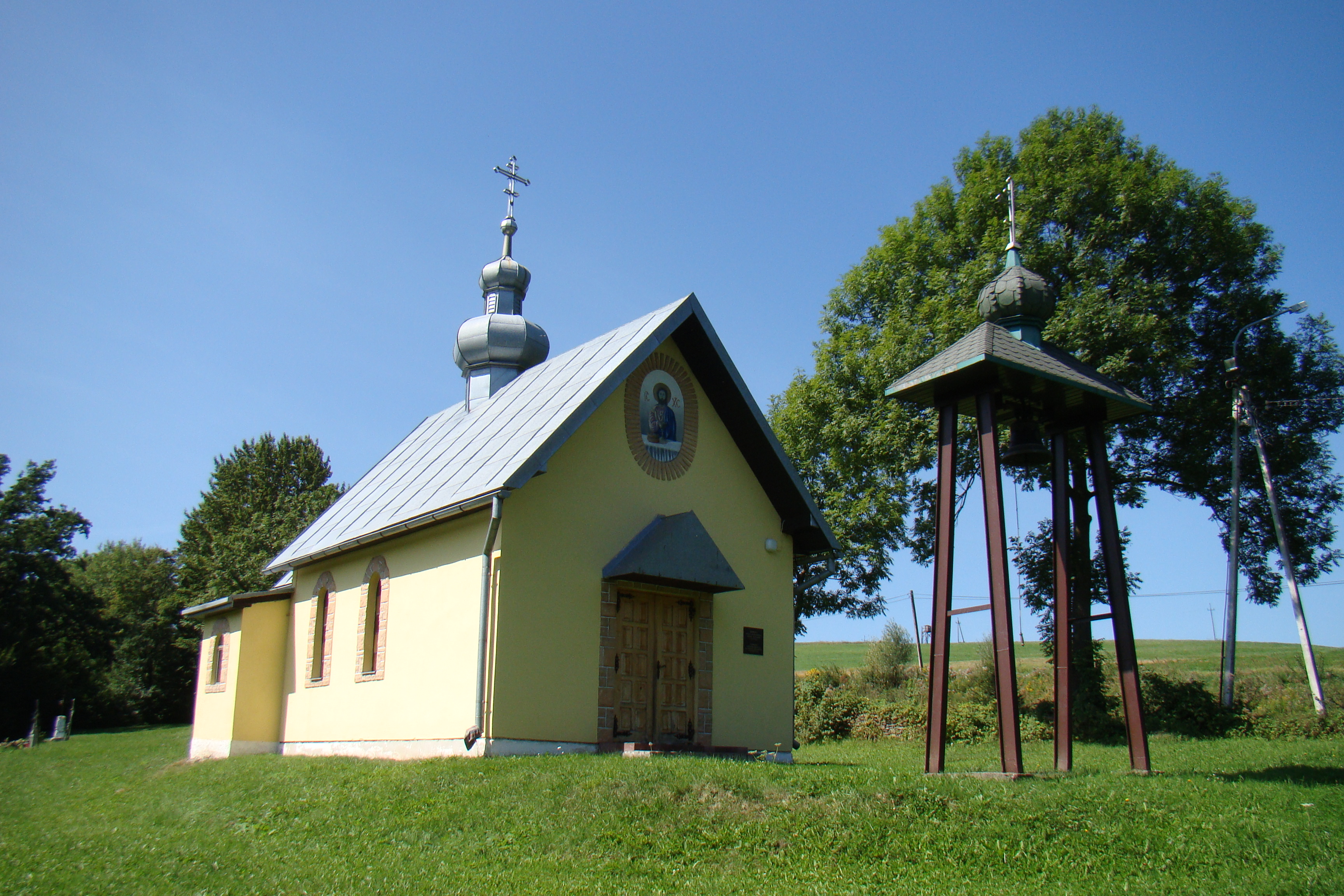
- Greek Catholic church

- Location within Poland
- Coordinates: 49°27′N 22°10′E
- Country: Poland
- Voivodeship: Subcarpathian
- County: Sanok
- Gmina: Komańcza
- Population: 110

Wysoczany [vɨsɔˈt͡ʂanɨ] is a village in the administrative district of Gmina Komańcza, within Sanok County, in the Subcarpathian Voivodeship (province) of south-eastern Poland, close to the border with Slovakia.

== History ==
The country was invested by Nicholas Herburt Odnowskiego around 1539; since 1635, it was extended to nearly Wallachia. Until 1772, the Ruthenian region, the land of Sanok. From 1772 belonged to cyrkułu Zaleski, and Sanok in Galicia.

The village lies on the railway line Przemyśl-Lupkowski, between Mokre and Szczawne stations. It is also on the confluence of the creek Płonki Osława, 451 m (1,480 ft) above sea level

To 1914, in Sanok County Office, the judicial district in Bukowsko. In 1843, the village had 1,172 inhabitants and 582 houses, pow. the village was 7.13 km^{2} (3 sq mi), with a population of Greek Catholic, Roman Catholics, and Jews. In 1936, the village had 634 inhabitants, and in 2010, the village had 110 inhabitants. Part of the village was Wólka Kożuszne (167 inhabitants). The village has a stud farm and several farm tourism. From November 1918 to January 1919, it was part of the Komancza Republic.

After 1944, the local Rusyny Ruthenians Ukrainians deported to the Ukrainian SSR and they found the resettled population exchange.

Between 1975 and 1998, the village belonged to administrative regional capital Rzeszów. Greek Catholic Church== The records of the wooden village church of "St. Paraskeva", was built in 1805. Its width was 6 meters, and 17 meters in length, and 12 meters in height. It had three large domes with brass crosses. The bell tower was wooden with one dome, and four bells. The church was occupied by the Greek Catholic until 1944. The church was destroyed by the Polish Army during World War II.

The cemetery dates back to 1512. After the church of 1805 was destroyed, there was little effort done to maintain the cemetery area. Since 1805 until the 1990s, the cemetery had been overgrown with trees and shrubs. Today, there are only a few tomb stones from that era left. Some have been destroyed during the building of the new stone church and by the people living there today.

The new Orthodox church was built in 1998, in the same place that the original former church of 1805, of St. Paraskeva stood. Which was a subsidiary of the parish in futile. The new church now falls within the parish church in Mokre to the Greek Catholics . The stone Church was originally intended as a cemetery chapel. Externally it is covered with a tin roof and slain plates, The dome finished with an apparent signature of the Orthodox cross to the sanctuary for Christian. In the interior of a modern iconostasis painted by Mrs. Krogulecką. In 2005, the church has been partially constructed wall paintings.

Before the curtain is the church bell tower with modern bells. The old four bell from the former church (1805), were stolen.

Today, the only evidence that can be seen of the Church of the 1805 is the few tomb stones and the stone wall, surrounding the cemetery.
