= Mików =

Lemko village in Poland

Mików Миків
- Hamlet
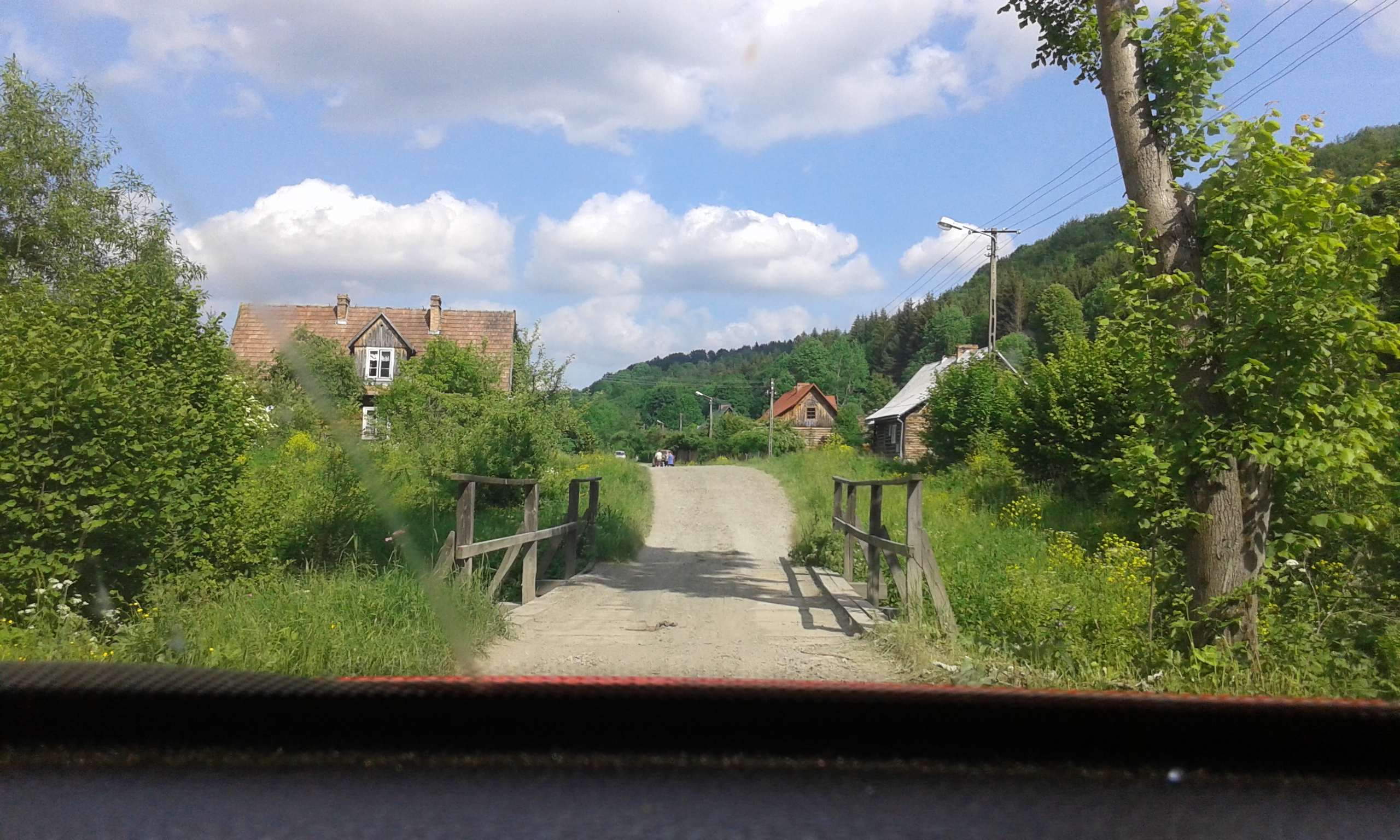
- A view of the settlement as recorded with a GT-I8260, 2015

- Location within Poland
- Coordinates: 49°19′N 22°7′E
- Country: Poland
- Voivodeship: Subcarpathian
- County: Sanok
- Gmina: Komańcza
- Population: 65

Mików [ˈmʲikuf] is a hamlet in the administrative district of Gmina Komańcza, within Sanok County, in the Subcarpathian Voivodeship (province) of south-eastern Poland, close to the border with Slovakia.

== See also ==
- Komancza Republic (November 1918 – January 1919)
