= Kulaszne =

Lemko village in Poland

Kulaszne Куляшне
- Village
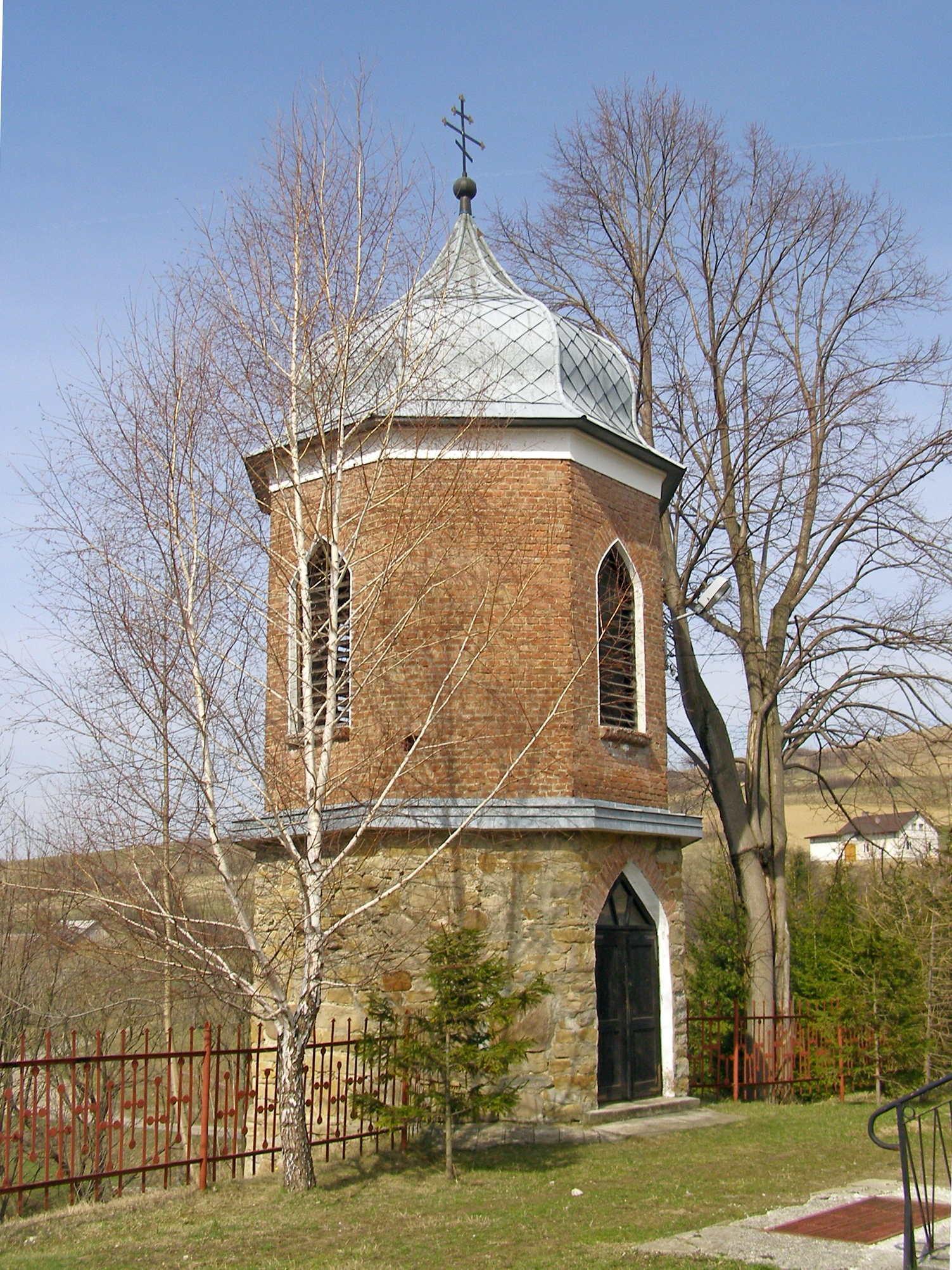
- A bell tower in the village

- Location within Poland
- Coordinates: 49°26′N 22°10′E
- Country: Poland
- Voivodeship: Subcarpathian
- County: Sanok
- Gmina: Komańcza
- Population: 220

Kulaszne [kuˈlaʂnɛ]| Ukr. Куляшне} is a village in the administrative district of Gmina Komańcza, within Sanok County, in the Subcarpathian Voivodeship (province) of south-eastern Poland, close to the border with Slovakia.

The Kulaszne church was built in 1912 as a Greek Catholic place of worship (cerkiew). It burned down in 1974 and a Roman Catholic church was built over the foundations.

== See also ==
- Komancza Republic (November 1918 – January 1919)
