= Panteleymon Shpylka =

Reverend Father Panteleymon Shpylka
- Пантелеймон Шпилька
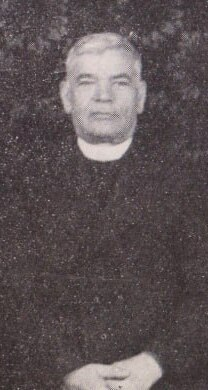
- Shpylka in c. 1915–1920

Head of the Council of the Komancza Republic
- In office 4 November 1918 – 23 January 1919
- Preceded by: Office created
- Succeeded by: Office abolished

Parish priest of the St. Onuphrius Church in Wisłok Wyzhniy
- In office 1917–1919
- Preceded by: Mykhailo Teslya
- Succeeded by: Mykhailo Kril

Personal details
- Born: 20 October 1883 Dmytrovychi, Austro-Hungarian Empire (now Lviv Oblast, Ukraine)
- Died: 5 March 1950 (aged 66) Winnipeg, Canada
- Party: Independent
- Education: Major Greek-Catholic Theological Seminary in Przemyśl
- Profession: Cleric, Greek Catholic priest, politician

Panteleymon Shpylka (Ukrainian: Пантелеймон Шпилька; 20 October 1883 – 5 March 1950) was a Ukrainian Greek Catholic clergyman. He was a co-founder and Head of the Council (Ukrainian: Голова Повітової Української Національної Ради) of the Komancza Republic, a short-lived microstate, an association of thirty-three Lemko villages, seated in Komańcza in eastern Lemkivshchyna from 4 November 1918 until 23 January 1919.

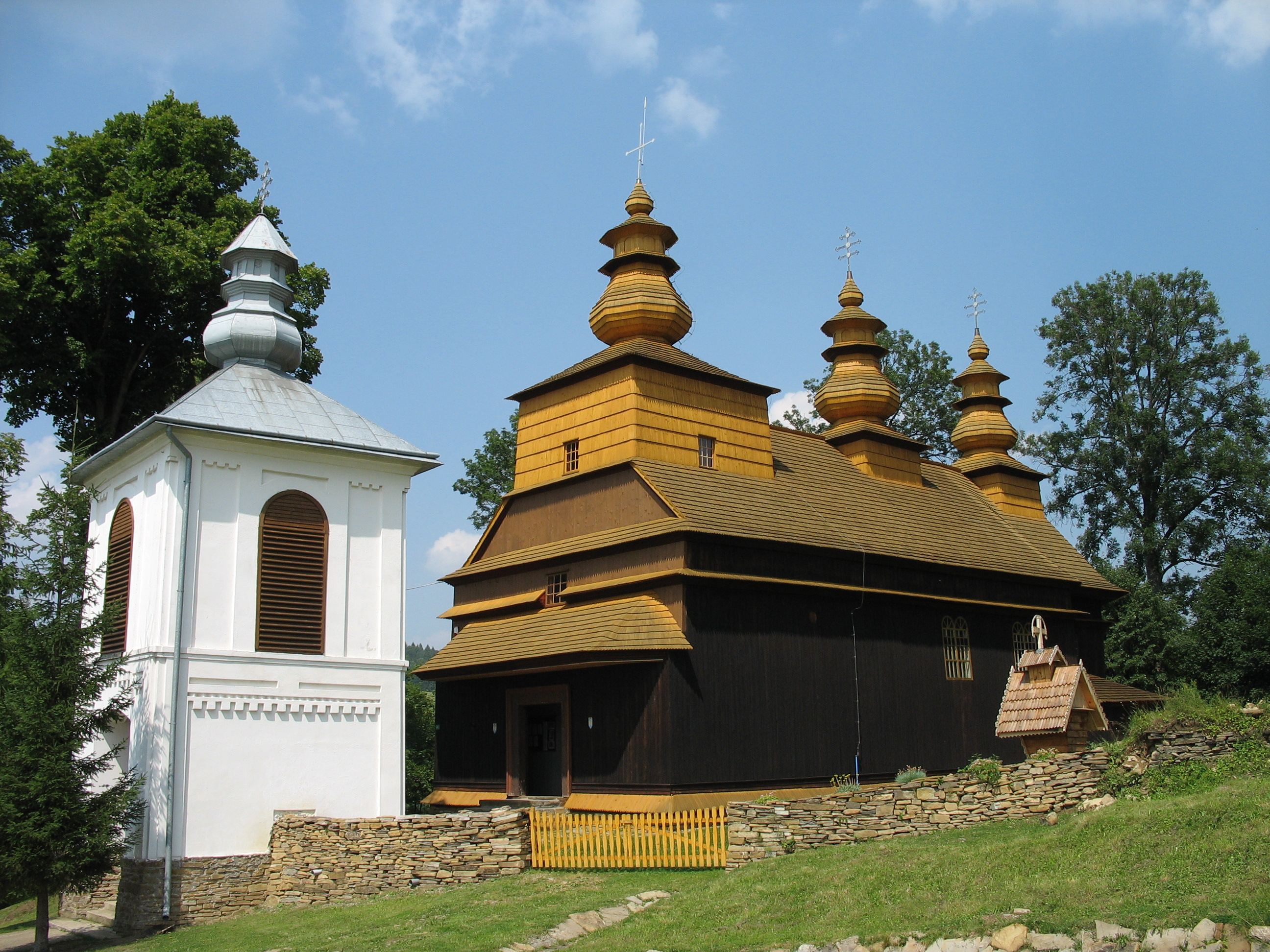
St. Onuphrius Church in Wisłok Wielki, where was a parish priest Rev. Panteleymon Shpylka (the church belongs to Roman Catholics in a present day)

== Early life ==
Fr. Shpylka was born in Dmytrovychi, Kingdom of Galicia and Lodomeria, Austro-Hungarian Empire in a Ukrainian Greek-Catholic family. After he graduated from the Ukrainian Gymnasium in Przemyśl in 1904, he joined the Major Greek-Catholic Theological Seminary in Przemyśl. After graduation from there, and his marriage, he was ordained a priest on 15 March 1910, for the Eparchy of Przemyśl, Sambir and Sanok by Bishop Kostyantyn Chekhovych. In 1917 he was appointed as a parish priest in St. Onuphrius church in Wisłok Wyzhniy.

== Political career ==
In the autumn of 1918, the Austro-Hungarian Empire collapsed and was replaced by multiple successor states. In the village where Fr. Shpylka was a parish priest, a popular movement began. With his support, a meeting of the inhabitants of close villages was convened. On 4 November 1918, more than 70 delegates from the surrounding villages came to the People's Assembly in Wisłok Wyzhniy. The delegates decided to join a new proclaimed West Ukrainian People's Republic in Lviv, and organized an Eastern Lemko Republic. Fr. Shpylka was elected as Head of the Council of the Republic. Later, he went to neighbouring countries, trying to attract the military and financial resources necessary for the Republic's existence, but did not succeed on this ground. When the army of another newly proclaimed state, Second Polish Republic, entered the territory of Komancza Republic, he avoided arrest, because he was in Czechoslovakia.

== Life in emigration ==
He spent his later years as a priest in Zakarpattia (1919–1944). After World War II, he lived in a displaced persons camp in Regensburg, Germany, where worked as a priest and catechist among the Greek-Catholics (1944–1948). The last years of his life he spent in Canada, where served as an assistant priest in the St. Michael church in Dauphin, Manitoba.

He died in Winnipeg on 5 March 1950.

Political offices
Preceded by Office created	Head of the Council of the Komancza Republic; 4 November 1918 – 23 January 1919	Succeeded by Office abolished
