= Moszczaniec =

Lemko hamlet in Poland

Moszczaniec Мощанець
- Hamlet
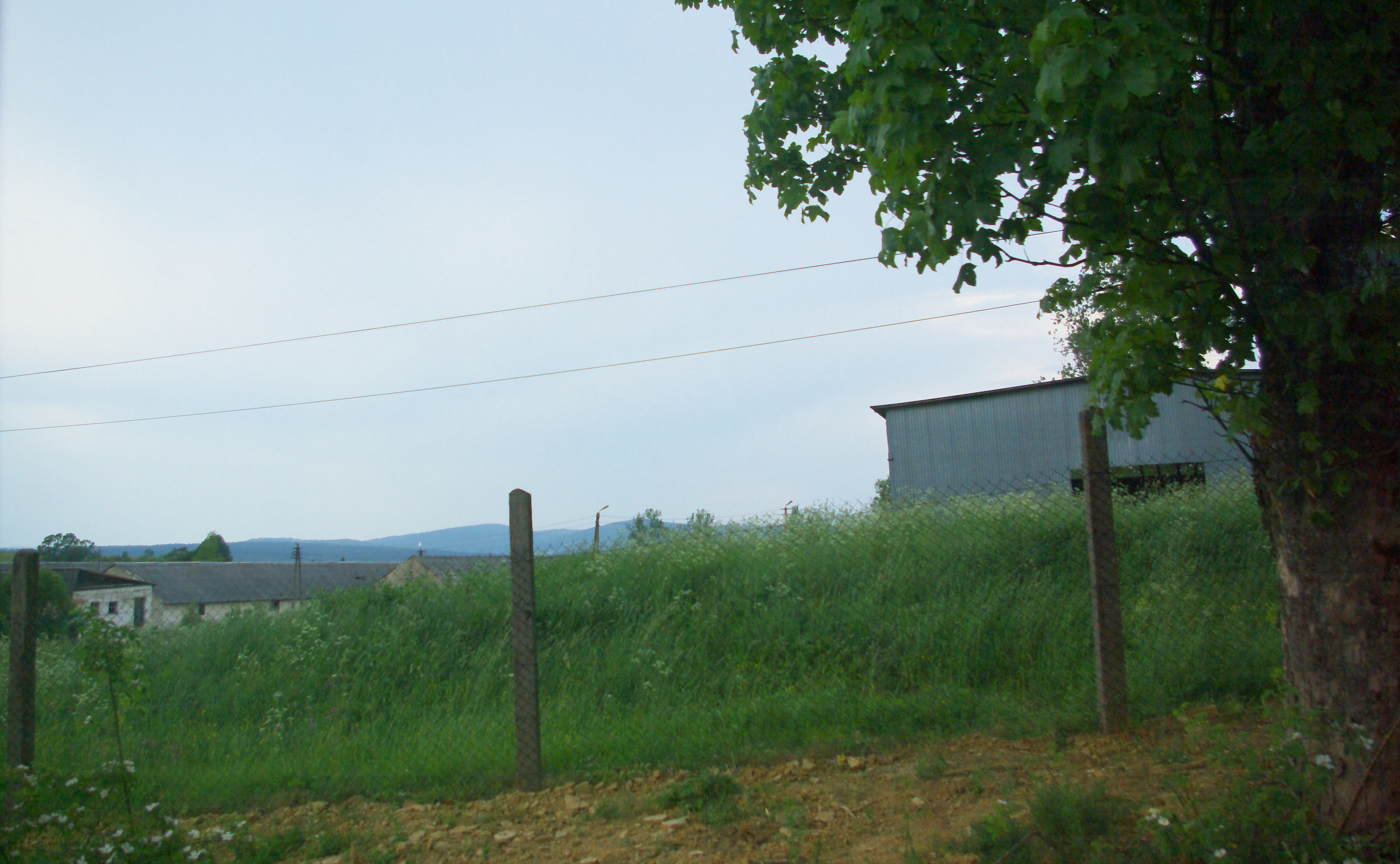

- Location within Poland
- Coordinates: 49°26′N 21°55′E
- Country: Poland
- Voivodeship: Subcarpathian
- County: Sanok
- Gmina: Komańcza
- Population: 250

Moszczaniec [mɔʂˈt͡ʂaɲɛt͡s] is a hamlet in the administrative district of Gmina Komańcza, within Sanok County, in the Subcarpathian Voivodeship (province) of south-eastern Poland, close to the border with Slovakia.

== See also ==
- Komancza Republic (November 1918 – January 1919)
