= Łupków =

Lemko village in Poland

Łupków Старий Лупків
- Hamlet
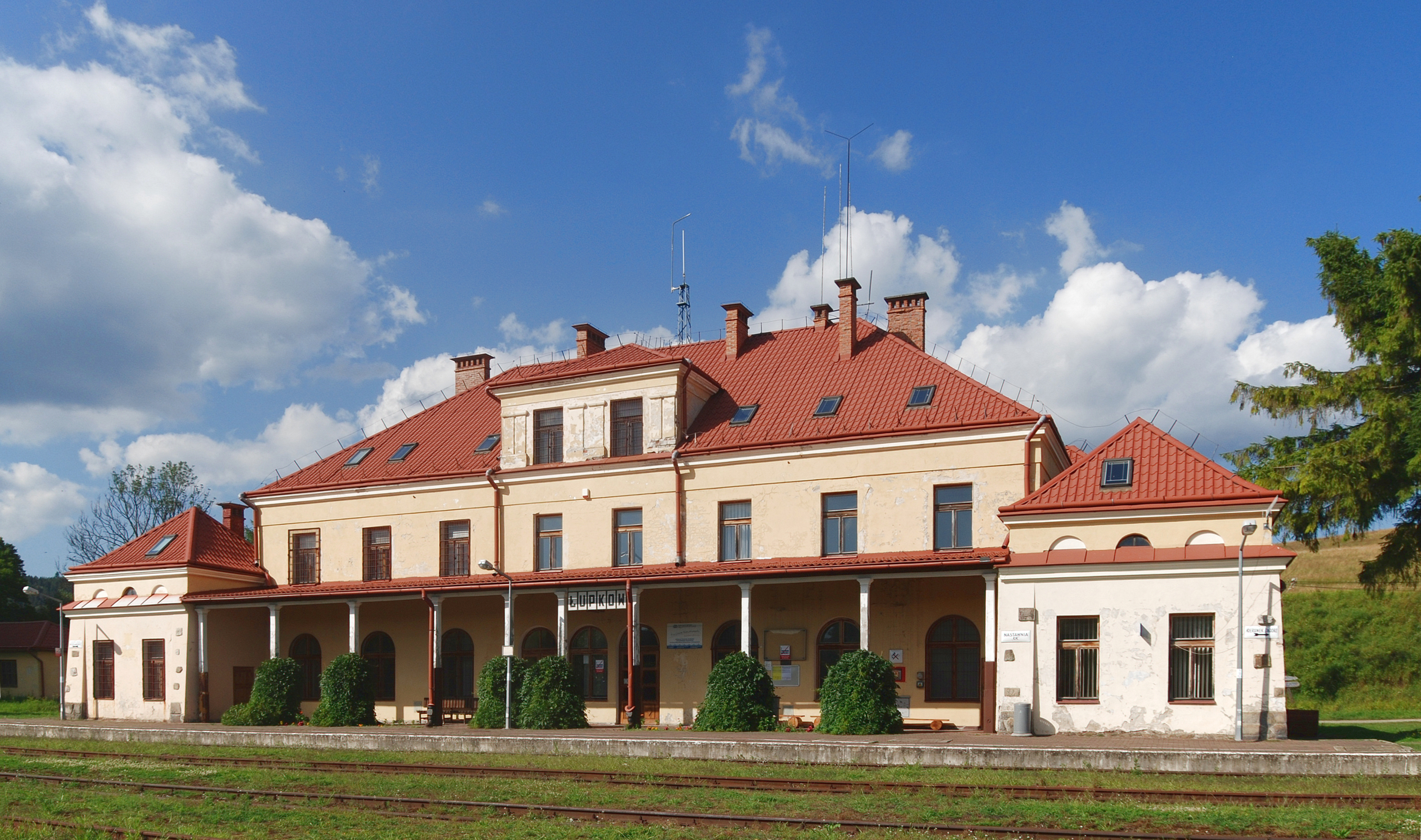
- Train station

- Location within Poland
- Coordinates: 49°14′45″N 22°3′35″E
- Country: Poland
- Voivodeship: Subcarpathian
- County: Sanok
- Gmina: Komańcza
- Population: 22

Łupków [ˈwupkuf] is a hamlet in the administrative district of Gmina Komańcza, within Sanok County, in the Subcarpathian Voivodeship (province) of south-eastern Poland, close to the border with Slovakia.

== See also ==
- Komańcza Republic (November 1918 – January 1919)
