= Darów =

Lemko village in Poland

Darów Дарів
- Village
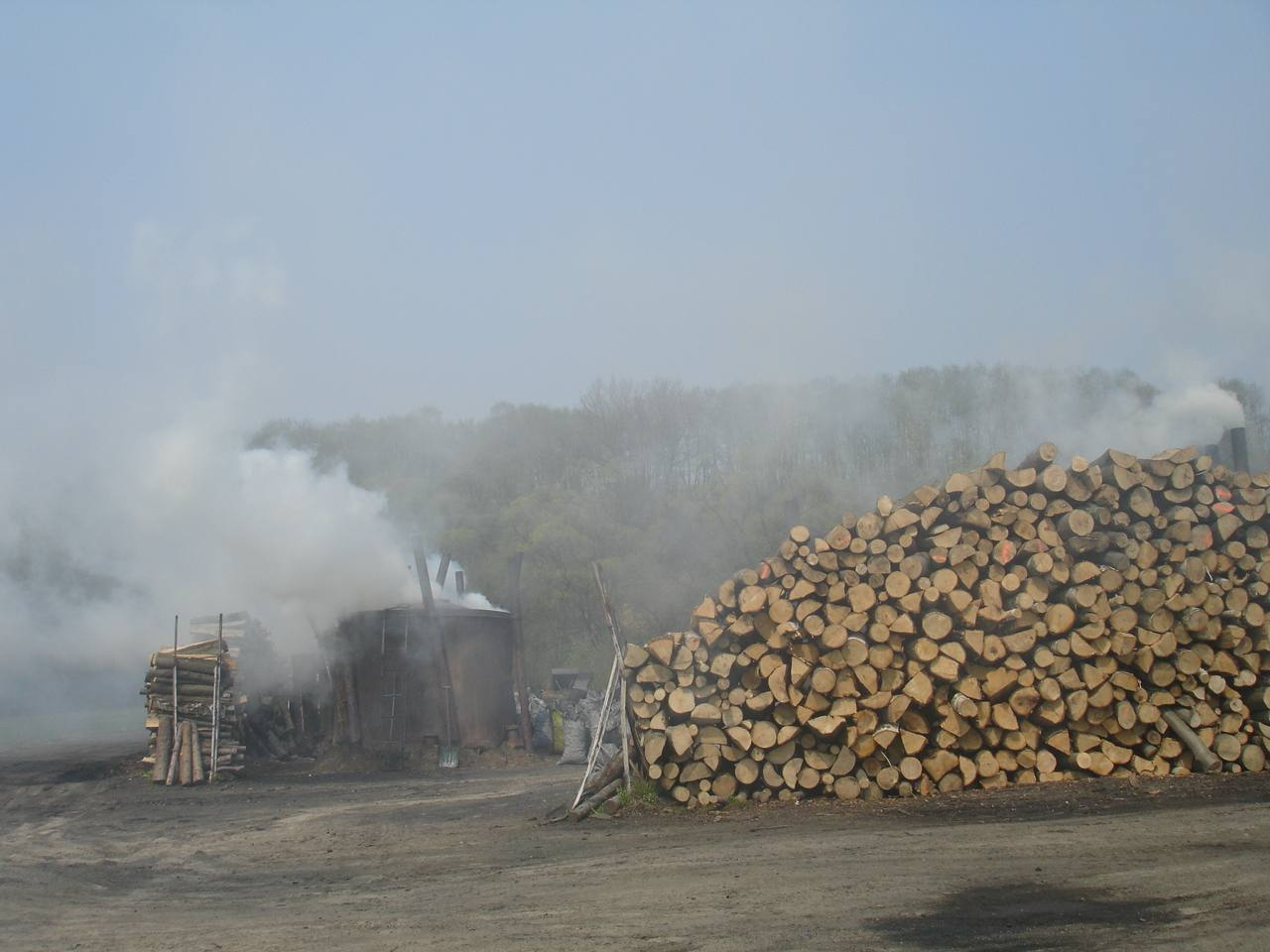
- Local charcoal production

- Location within Poland
- Coordinates: 49°27′3″N 21°56′12″E
- Country: Poland
- Voivodeship: Subcarpathian
- County: Krosno
- Gmina: Jaśliska
- Population: 10

Darów [ˈdaruf] is a village in the administrative district of Gmina Jaśliska, within Krosno County, in the Subcarpathian Voivodeship (province) of south-eastern Poland, close to the border with Slovakia.

== See also ==
- Komancza Republic (November 1918 – January 1919)
