= Dołżyca =

Dołżyca may refer to two villages in the Subcarpathian Voivodeship (province) of south-eastern Poland:

- Dołżyca, Lesko County, a village in the administrative district of Gmina Cisna, within Lesko County.
- Dołżyca, Sanok County, a village in the administrative district of Gmina Komańcza, within Sanok County.
