= Morochów =

Lemko village in Poland

Morochów Морохів
- Village
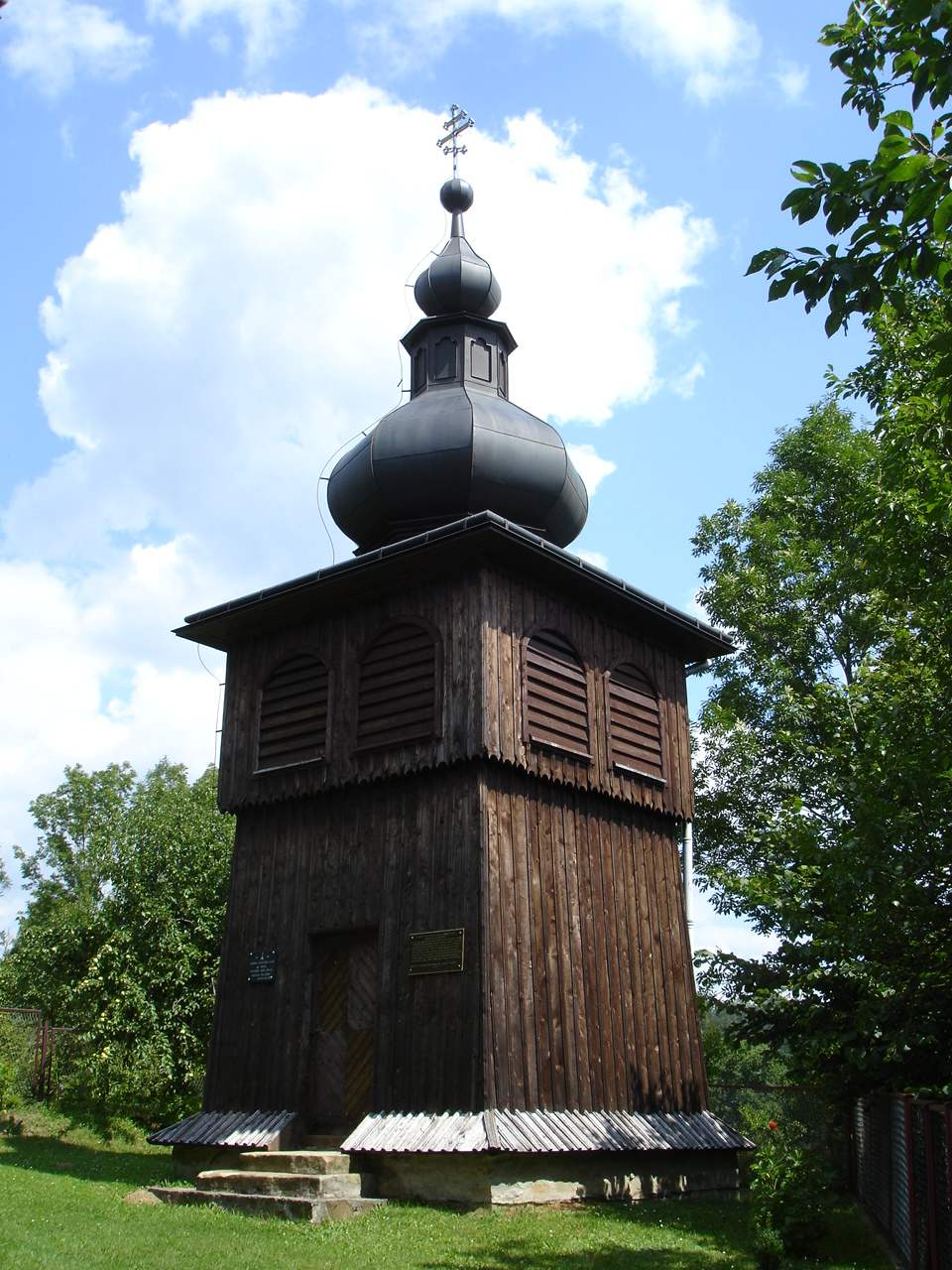
- Wooden bell tower

- Location within Poland
- Coordinates: 49°28′1″N 22°11′5″E
- Country: Poland
- Voivodeship: Subcarpathian
- County: Sanok
- Gmina: Zagórz
- Population: 300

Morochów [mɔˈrɔxuf] is a village in the administrative district of Gmina Zagórz, within Sanok County, in the Subcarpathian Voivodeship (province) of south-eastern Poland.

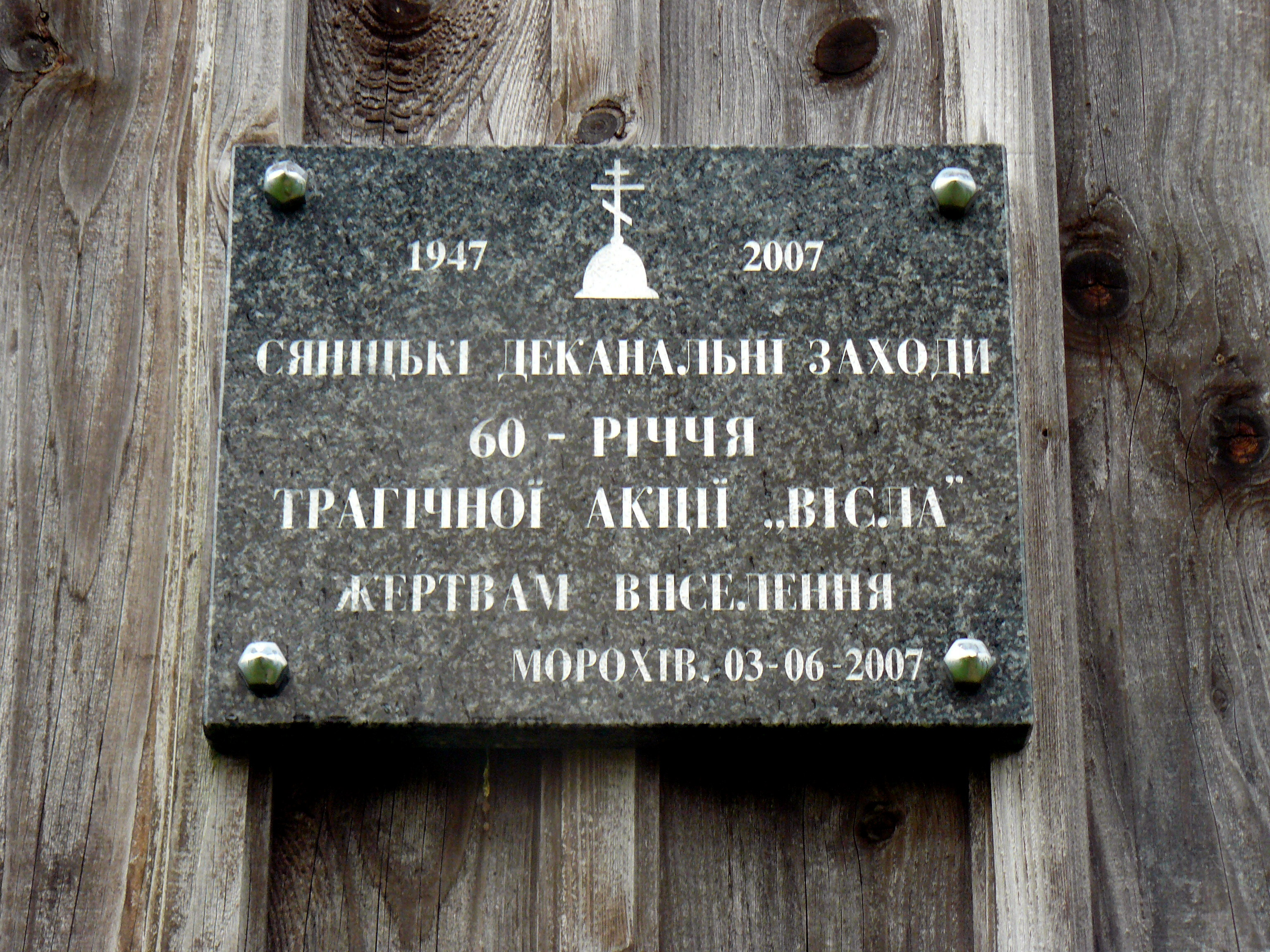
A plaque commemorating Operation Vistula on the orthodox church of Morochów

The Lemko population of Morochów was largely expelled by the Polish government in 1947, during Operation Vistula.

== See also ==
- Komańcza Republic (November 1918 – January 1919)
