= Maniów, Podkarpackie Voivodeship =

Lemko settlement in Poland

Maniów Манів
- Hamlet
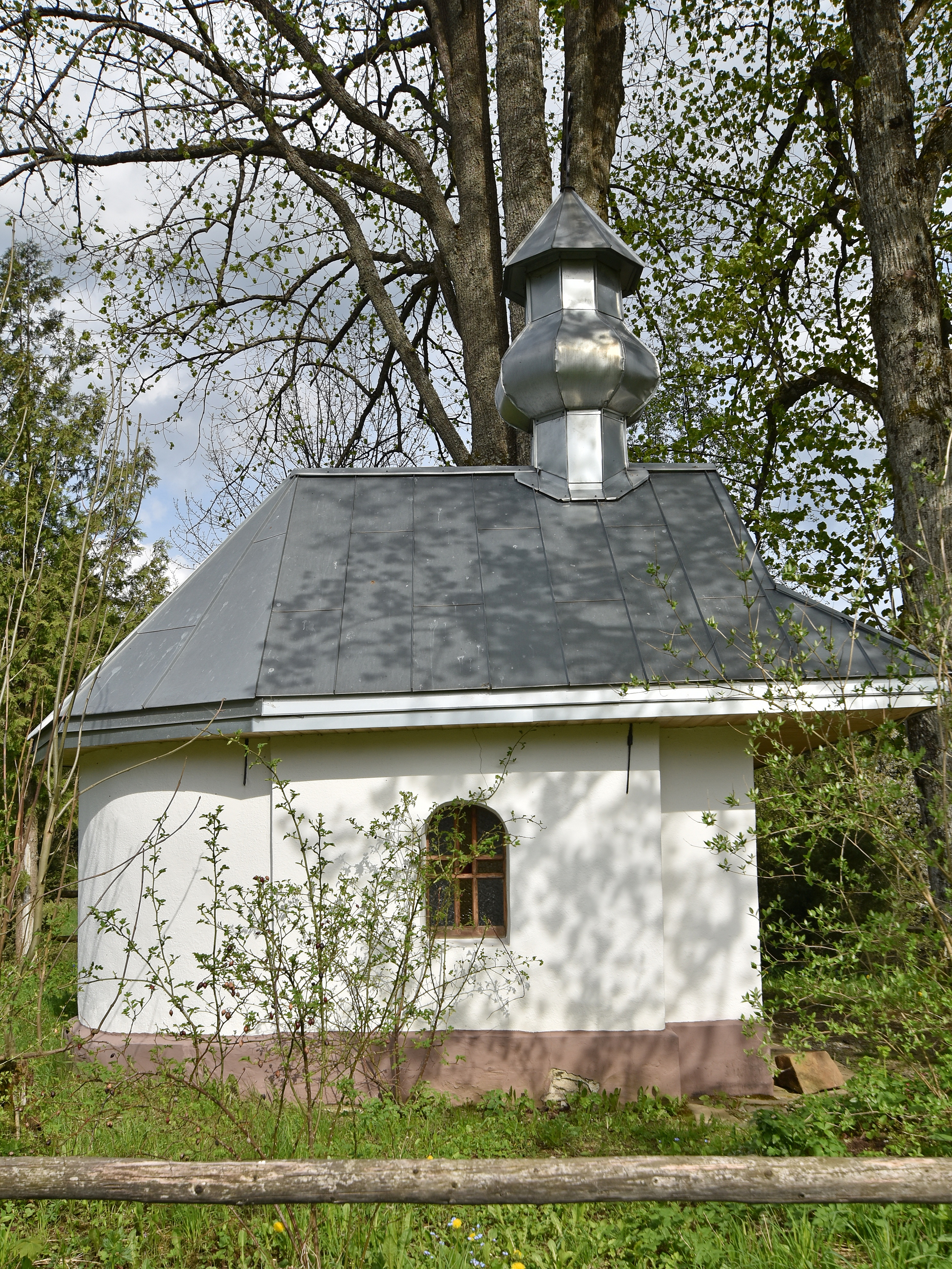
- A chapel from the 19th century in the hamlet

- Location within Poland
- Coordinates: 49°23′N 22°9′E
- Voivodeship: Subcarpathian
- County: Sanok
- Gmina: Komańcza

Maniów [ˈmaɲuf] is a hamlet in the administrative district of Gmina Komańcza, within Sanok County, in the Subcarpathian Voivodeship (province) of south-eastern Poland, close to the border with Slovakia.

== See also ==
- Komancza Republic (November 1918 – January 1919)
