= Balnica =

Former Lemko village in Poland

Balnica Бальниця
- Hamlet
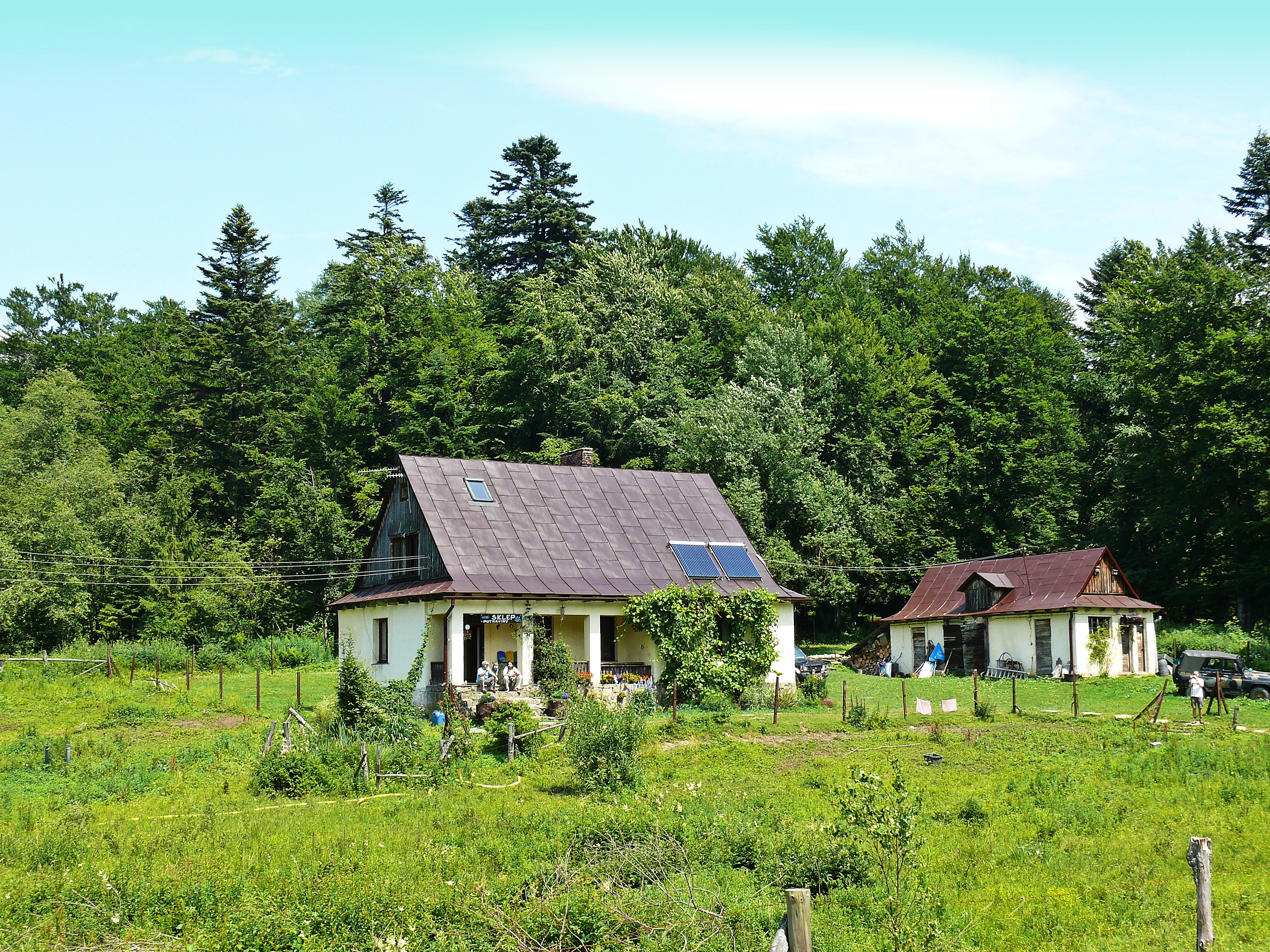

- Location within Poland
- Coordinates: 49°13′0″N 22°12′0″E
- Country: Poland
- Voivodeship: Subcarpathian
- County: Sanok
- Gmina: Komańcza
- Population: 9

Balnica [balˈɲit͡sa] is a former village in the administrative district of Gmina Komańcza, within Sanok County, in the Subcarpathian Voivodeship (province) of south-eastern Poland, close to the border with Slovakia.

The village, which was populated by Lemkos, ceased to exist after the 1944–46 population exchange between Poland and Soviet Ukraine.

== See also ==
- Komancza Republic (November 1918 – January 1919)
