= Wola Michowa =

Lemko village in Poland

Wola Michowa Воля мiгова
- Hamlet
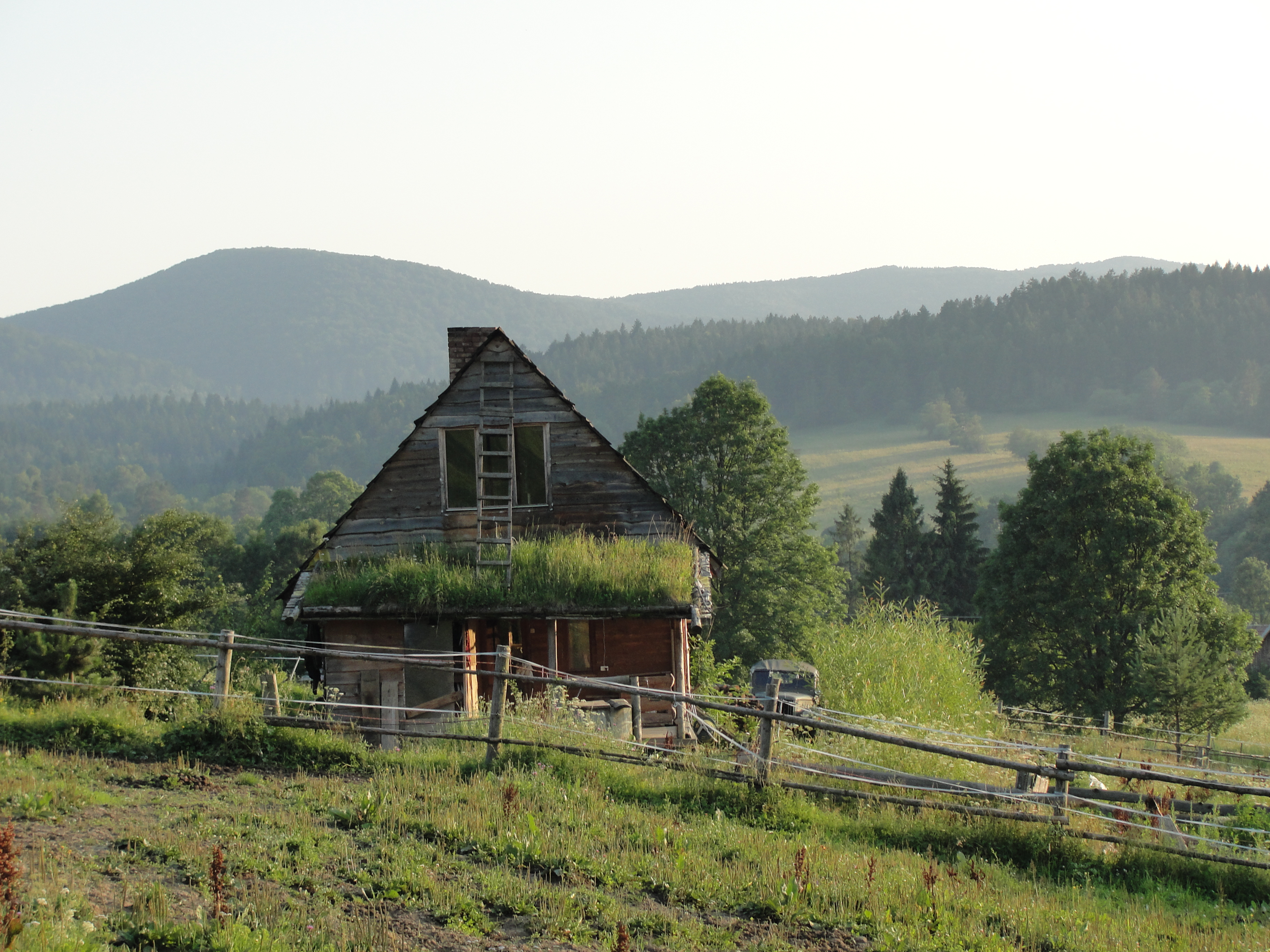

- Location within Poland
- Coordinates: 49°14′N 22°9′E
- Country: Poland
- Voivodeship: Subcarpathian
- County: Sanok
- Gmina: Komańcza
- Population: 90

Wola Michowa (Polish: [ˈvɔla miˈxɔva]) is a hamlet in the administrative district of Gmina Komańcza, within Sanok County, in the Subcarpathian Voivodeship (province) of south-eastern Poland, close to the border with Slovakia.

== History ==
In 1546, the village was designated under Wallachian law as royal property.

== Gallery ==
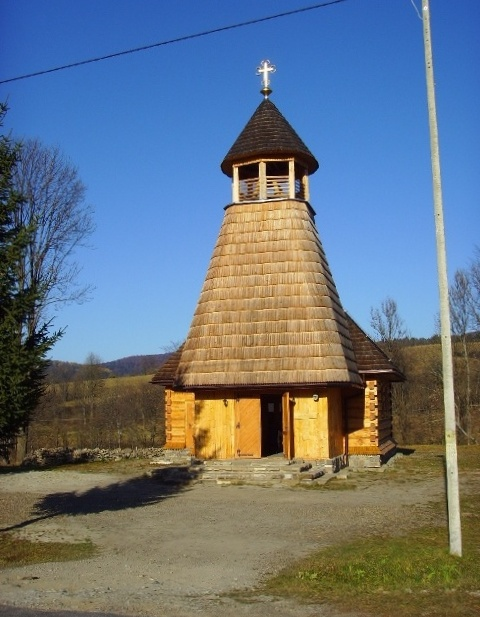
Newly constructed filial church in Wola Michowa

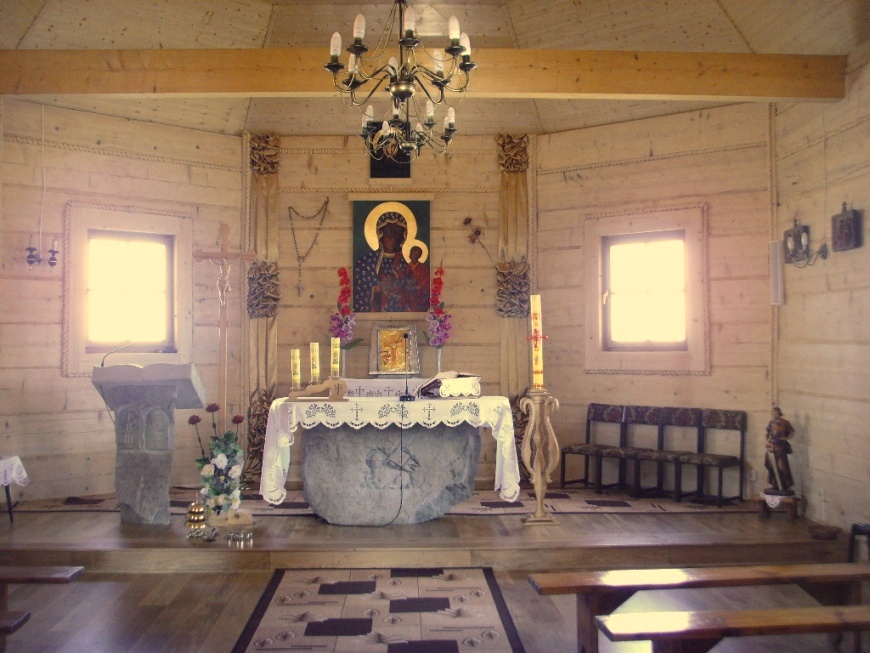
Interior view of the church in Wola Michowa

== See also ==
- Komancza Republic (November 1918 – January 1919)
