= Rzepedź =

Lemko village in Poland

Rzepedź Репедь
- Village
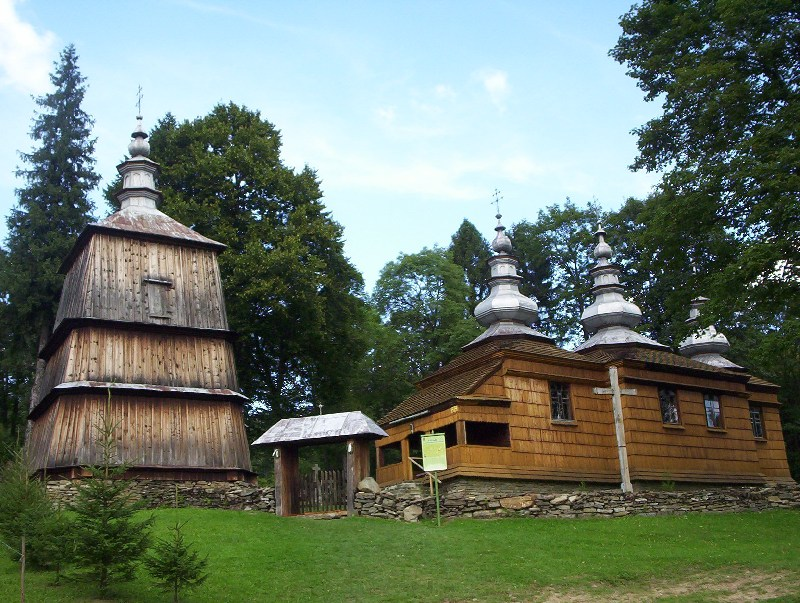
- Church in Rzepedź Wieś

- Location within Poland
- Coordinates: 49°23′N 22°7′E
- Country: Poland
- Voivodeship: Subcarpathian
- County: Sanok
- Gmina: Komańcza
- Population: 1,400
- Website: rzepedz.pl

Rzepedź [ˈʐɛpɛt͡ɕ] is a village in the administrative district of Gmina Komańcza, within Sanok County, in the Subcarpathian Voivodeship (province) of south-eastern Poland, close to the border with Slovakia.

== See also ==
- Komancza Republic (November 1918 – January 1919)
