= Szczawne =

Lemko village in Poland

Szczawne Щавне
- Village
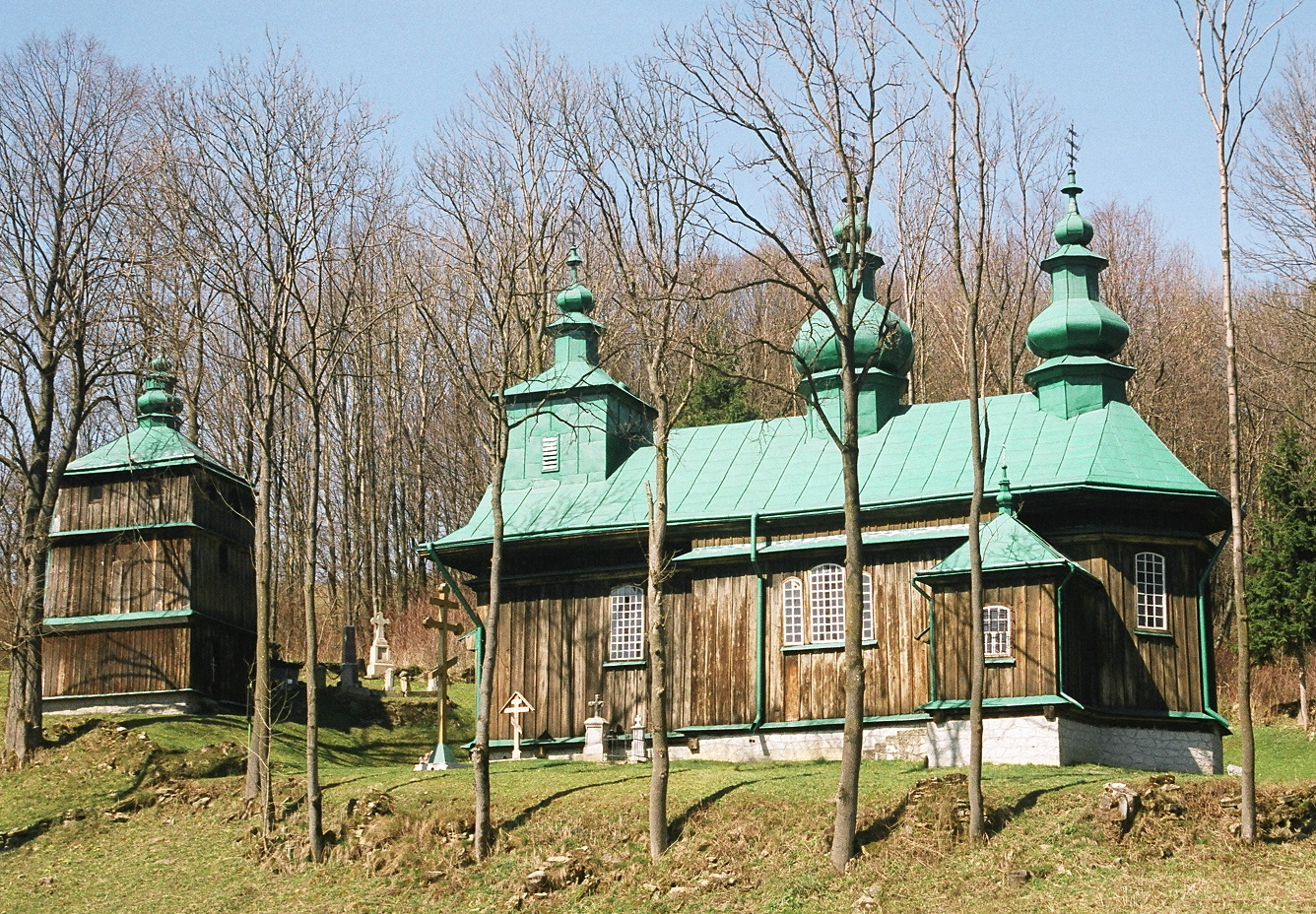
- Ukrainian Greek Catholic Church in Szczawne

- Location within Poland
- Coordinates: 49°24′N 22°8′E
- Country: Poland
- Voivodeship: Subcarpathian
- County: Sanok
- Gmina: Komańcza
- First Mentioned: 1492
- Population: 400

Szczawne [ˈʂt͡ʂavnɛ] is a village in the administrative district of Gmina Komańcza, within Sanok County, in the Subcarpathian Voivodeship (province) of south-eastern Poland, close to the border with Slovakia.

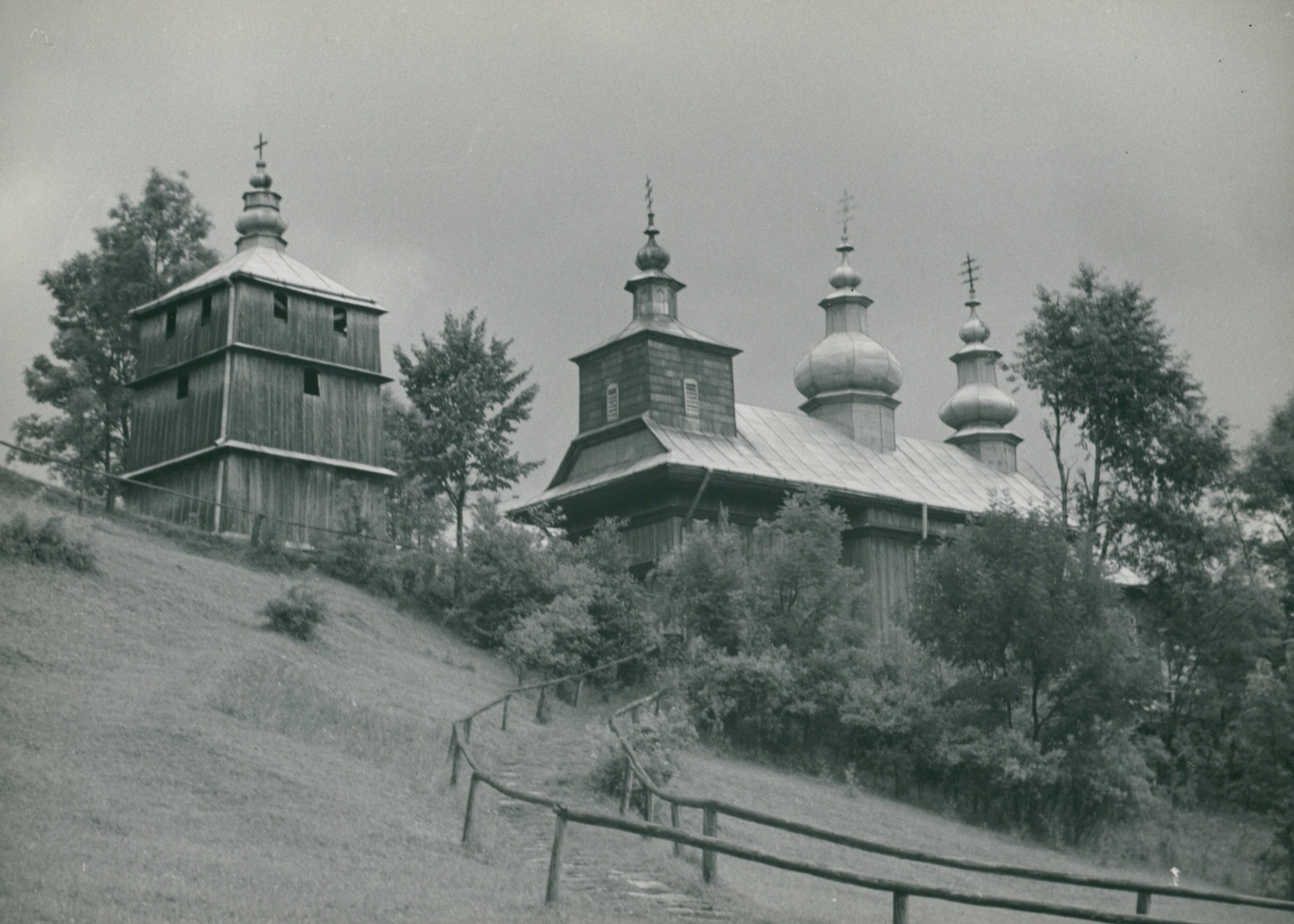
View of the Orthodox church before 1936

== See also ==
- Komancza Republic (November 1918 – January 1919)
