= Czystogarb =

Village in Subcarpathian Voivodeship, Poland

- Village
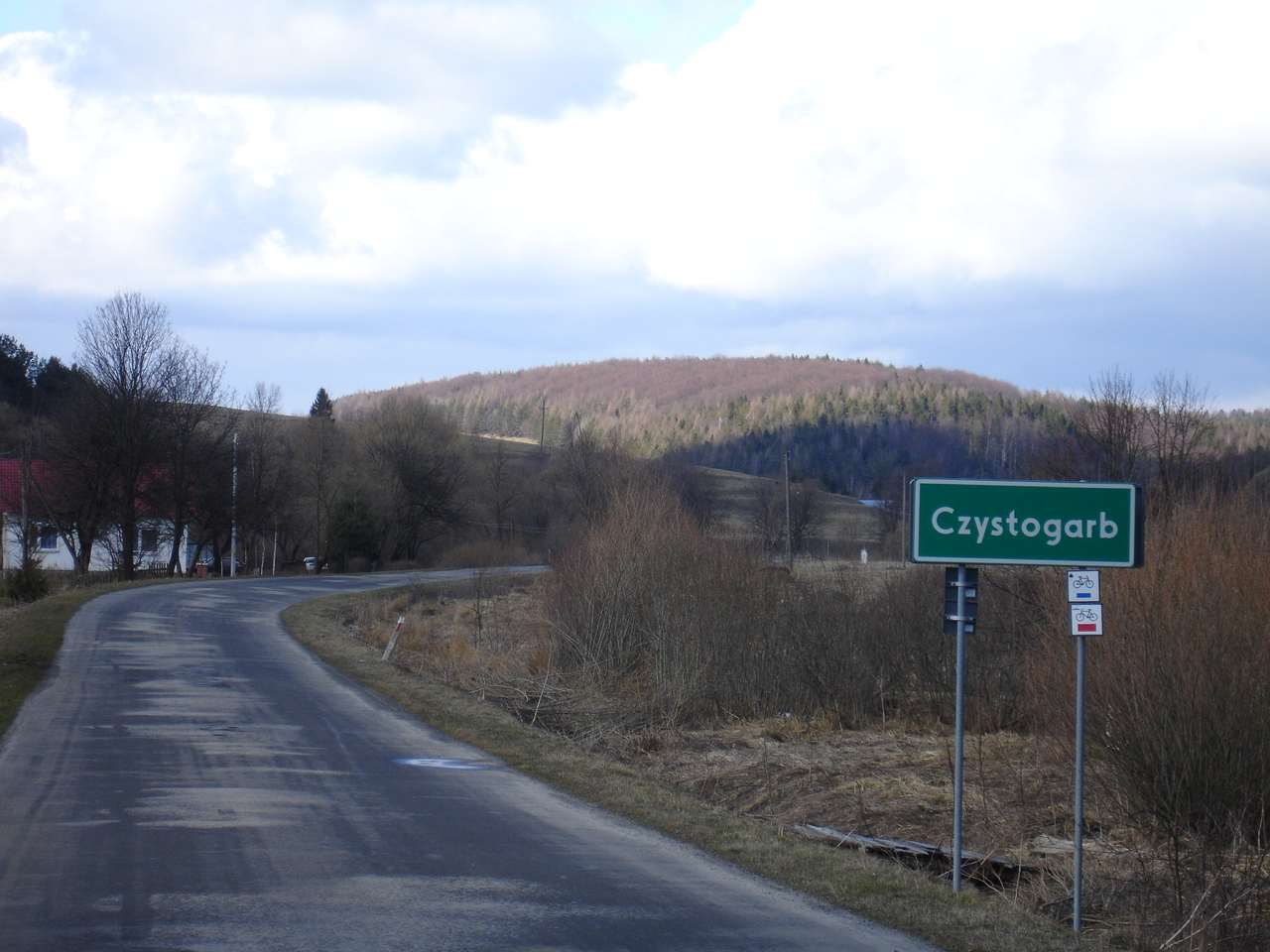

- Location within Poland
- Coordinates: 49°23′N 22°1′E
- Country: Poland
- Voivodeship: Subcarpathian
- County: Sanok
- Gmina: Komańcza

Population
  - Total: 309
- Time zone: UTC+1 (CET)
  - Summer (DST): UTC+2 (CEST)
- Vehicle registration: RSA

Czystogarb [t͡ʂɨsˈtɔɡarp] Ukr. Чистогорб) is a village in the administrative district of Gmina Komańcza, within Sanok County, in the Subcarpathian Voivodeship (province) of south-eastern Poland, close to the border with Slovakia.

Five Polish citizens were murdered by Nazi Germany in the village during World War II.
