= Smolnik, Sanok County =

Lemko village in Poland

Smolnik Смільник
- Village
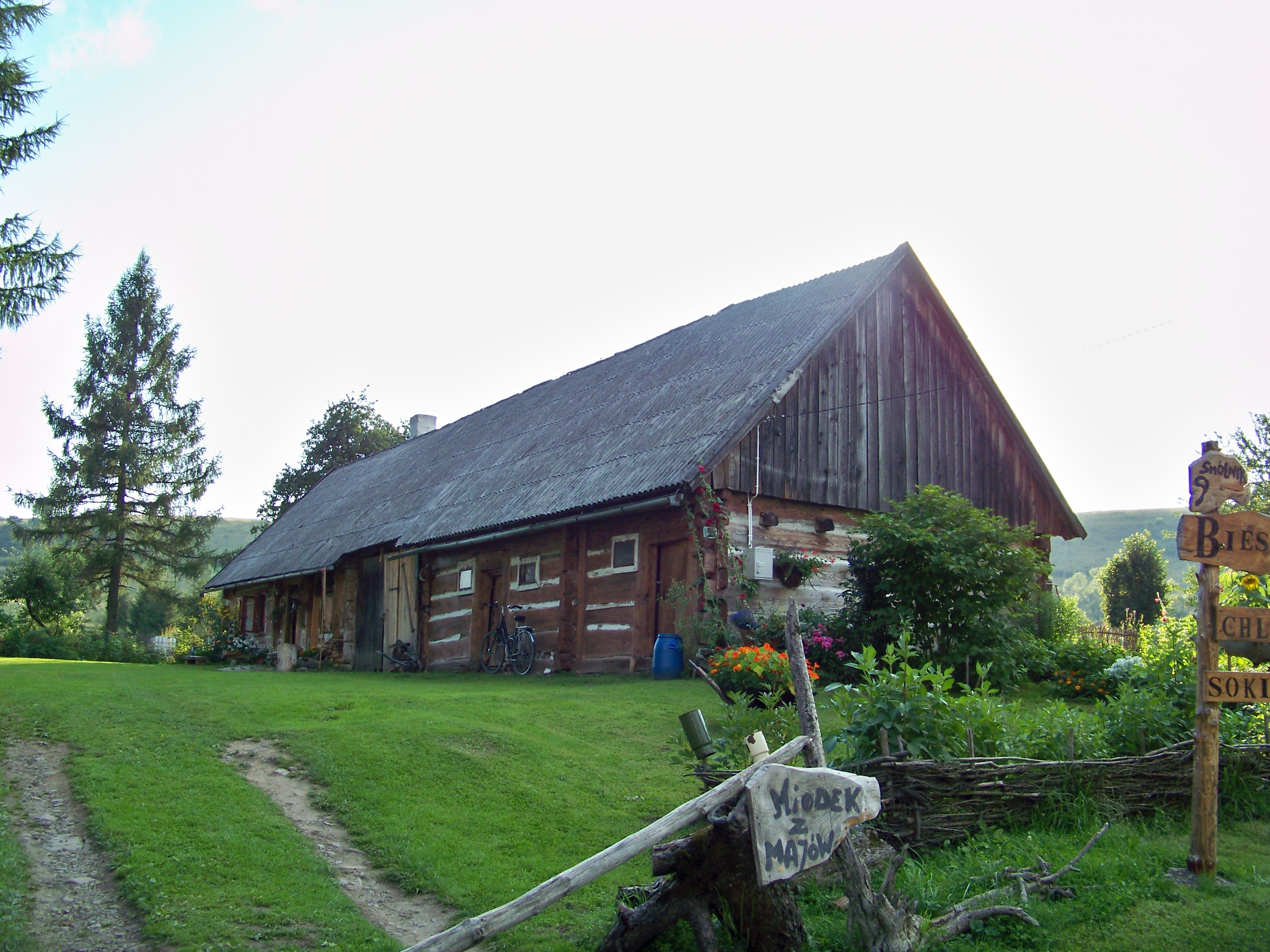

- Location within Poland
- Coordinates: 49°16′18″N 22°7′13″E
- Country: Poland
- Voivodeship: Subcarpathian
- County: Sanok
- Gmina: Komańcza
- Population: 160

Smolnik [ˈsmɔlɲik] is a village in the administrative district of Gmina Komańcza, within Sanok County, Subcarpathian Voivodeship, in south-eastern Poland, close to the border with Slovakia.
