= Polany Surowiczne =

- Village
- Location within Poland
- Coordinates: 49°27′1″N 21°52′50″E
- Country: Poland
- Voivodeship: Subcarpathian
- County: Sanok
- Gmina: Komańcza
- Population: 0

Polany Surowiczne [pɔˈlanɨ surɔˈvʲit͡ʂnɛ] is a former village in the administrative district of Gmina Komańcza, within Sanok County, Subcarpathian Voivodeship, in south-eastern Poland, close to the border with Slovakia.
