= Habura =

Village in Slovakia

- Municipality
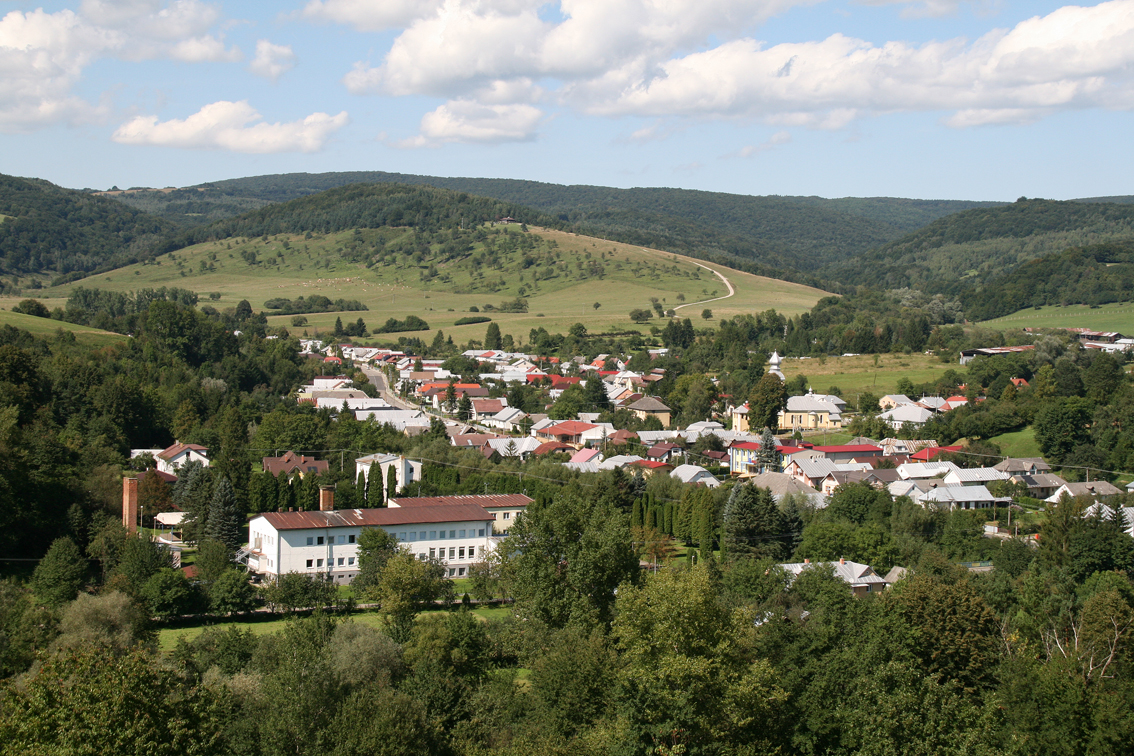

- Flag

- Location of Habura in the Prešov Region Location of Habura in Slovakia
- Coordinates: 49.33°N 21.87°E
- Country: Slovakia
- Region: Prešov Region
- District: Medzilaborce District
- First mentioned: 1543

Government
  - Mayor: Michal Prejsa (KDH)

Area
  - Total: 27.82 km^{2} (10.74 sq mi)
- Elevation: 376 m (1,234 ft)

Population (2025)
  - Total: 442
- Time zone: UTC+1 (CET)
  - Summer (DST): UTC+2 (CEST)
- Postal code: 675 2
- Area code: +421 57
- Vehicle registration plate (until 2022): ML
- Website: www.habura.sk

Habura (Rusyn: Габура; Hungarian: Laborcfő) is a village and municipality in the Medzilaborce District in the Prešov Region of far north-eastern Slovakia.

== History ==
In historical records the village was first mentioned in 1543. Before the establishment of independent Czechoslovakia in 1918, it was part of Zemplén County within the Kingdom of Hungary.

== Geography ==
The municipality lies at an altitude of 376 metres (1,234 ft) and covers an area of 27.82 km^{2} (10.74 sq mi) (2025).

== Population ==
Population statistic (10 years)
Year	1995	2005	2015	2025
Count	527	495	504	442
Difference		−6.07%	+1.81%	−12.30%

Population statistic
Year	2024	2025
Count	450	442
Difference		−1.77%

It has a population of 442 people (31 December 2025).

=== Ethnicity ===
Census 2021 (1+ %)
Ethnicity	Number	Fraction
Slovak	279	59.74%
Rusyn	275	58.88%
Ukrainian	18	3.85%
Not found out	12	2.56%
Czech	6	1.28%
Total	467	

In year 2021 was 467 people by ethnicity 279 as Slovak, 275 as Rusyn, 18 as Ukrainian, 12 as Not found out, 6 as Czech, 1 as Romanian and 1 as Hungarian.

Note on population: The difference values of population numbers in the table "Population statistic" and in the sections "Ethnicity" & "Religion" is caused by the use of various statistical methods.

=== Religion ===
Census 2021 (1+ %)
Religion	Number	Fraction
Greek Catholic Church	327	70.02%
Roman Catholic Church	38	8.14%
Eastern Orthodox Church	32	6.85%
None	31	6.64%
Jehovah's Witnesses	21	4.5%
Not found out	12	2.57%
Total	467	

In year 2021 was 467 people by religion 327 from Greek Catholic Church, 38 from Roman Catholic Church, 32 from Eastern Orthodox Church, 31 from None, 21 from Jehovah's Witnesses, 12 from Not found out, 3 from Evangelical Church, 1 from Other, 1 from Baptists Church and 1 from Ad hoc movements.

== Genealogical resources ==
The records for genealogical research are available at the state archive "Statny Archiv in Presov, Slovakia"

- Greek Catholic church records (births/marriages/deaths): 1894-1896 (parish A)

== Gallery ==
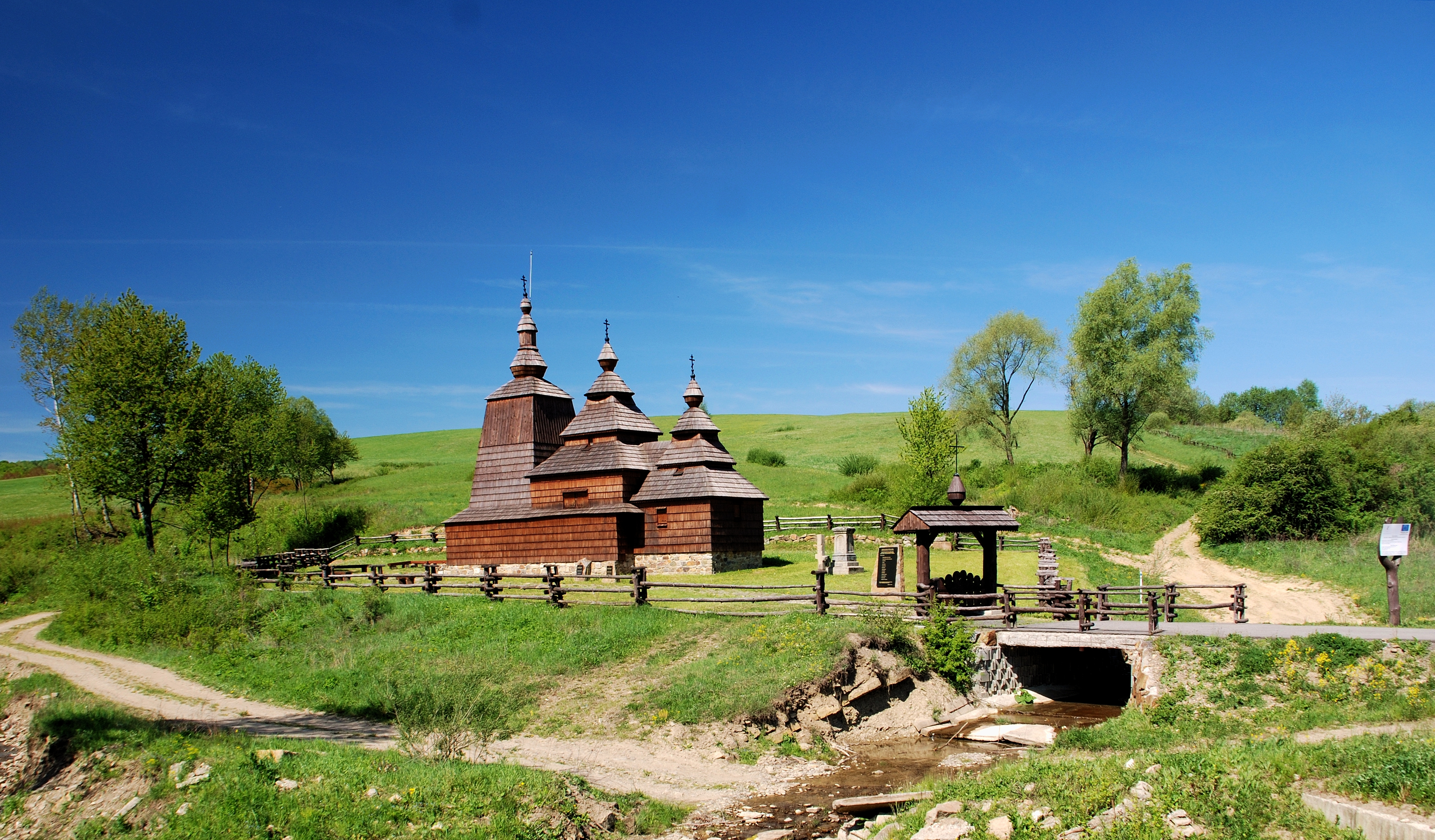
Wooden Church of Saint Nicholas the Miracle-worker in Habura

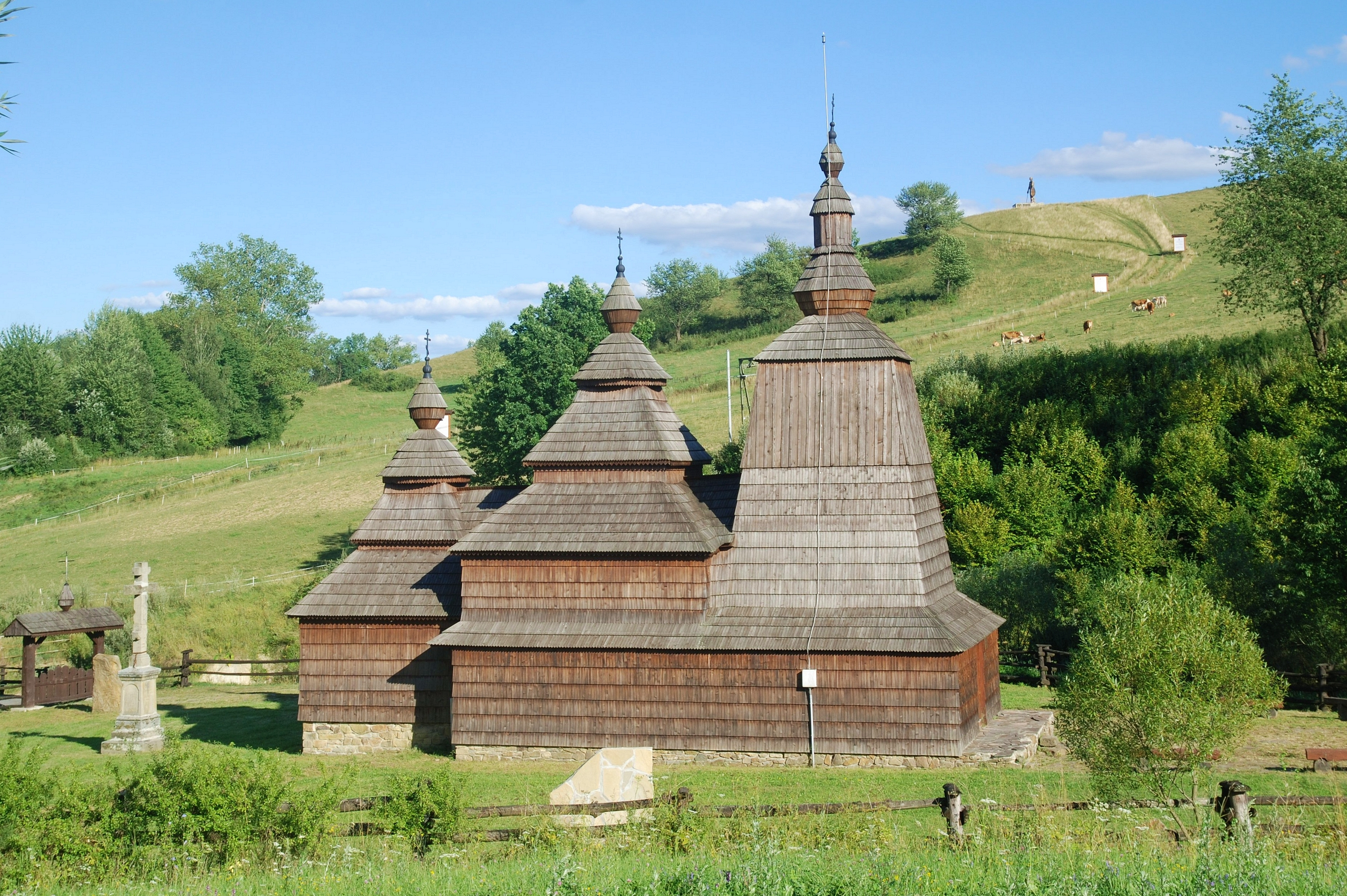
Wooden Church of Saint Nicholas in Habura

Wooden Church of Saint Nicholas in Habura (seen from the west)

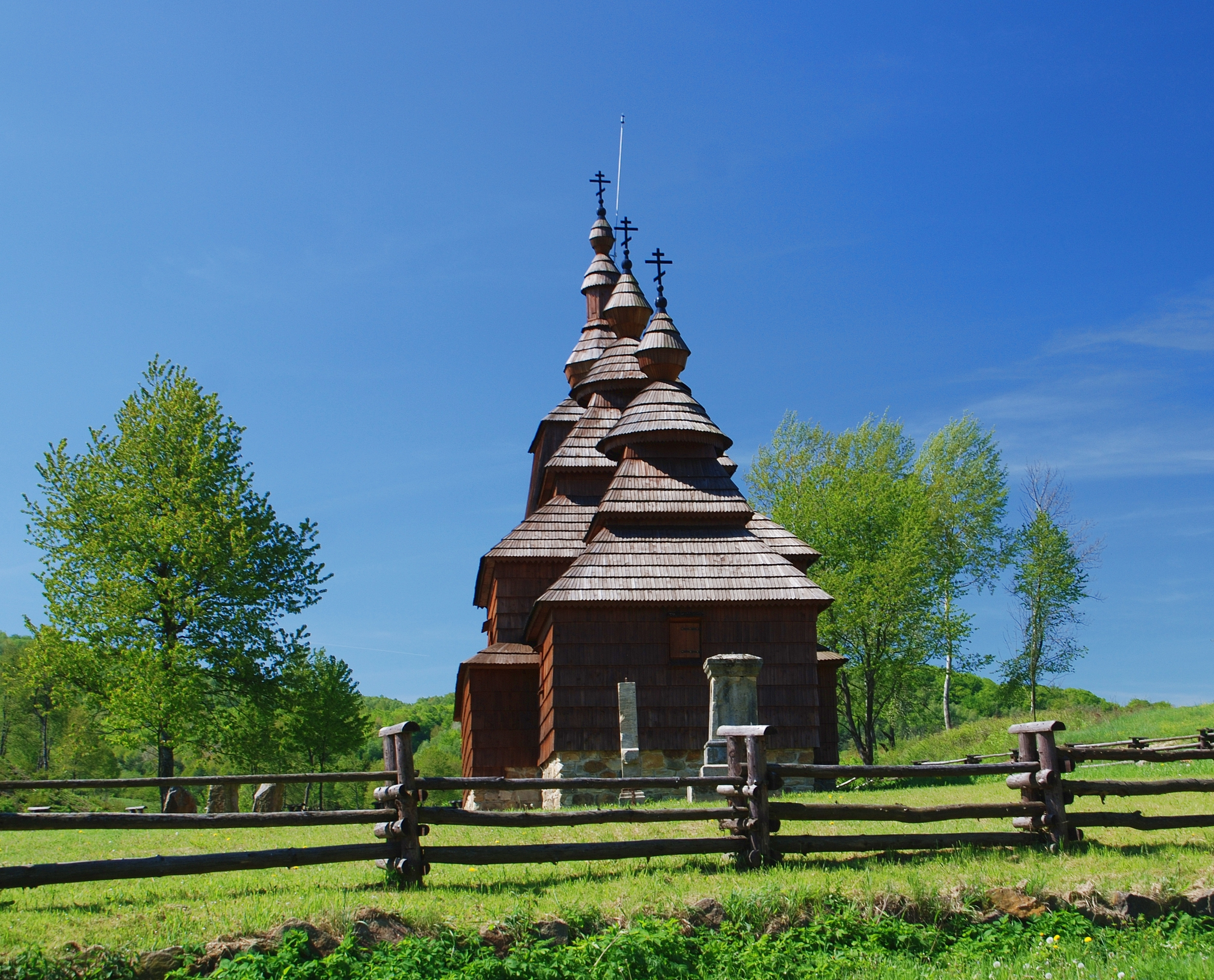
Wooden Church of Saint Nicholas in Habura (seen from the east)

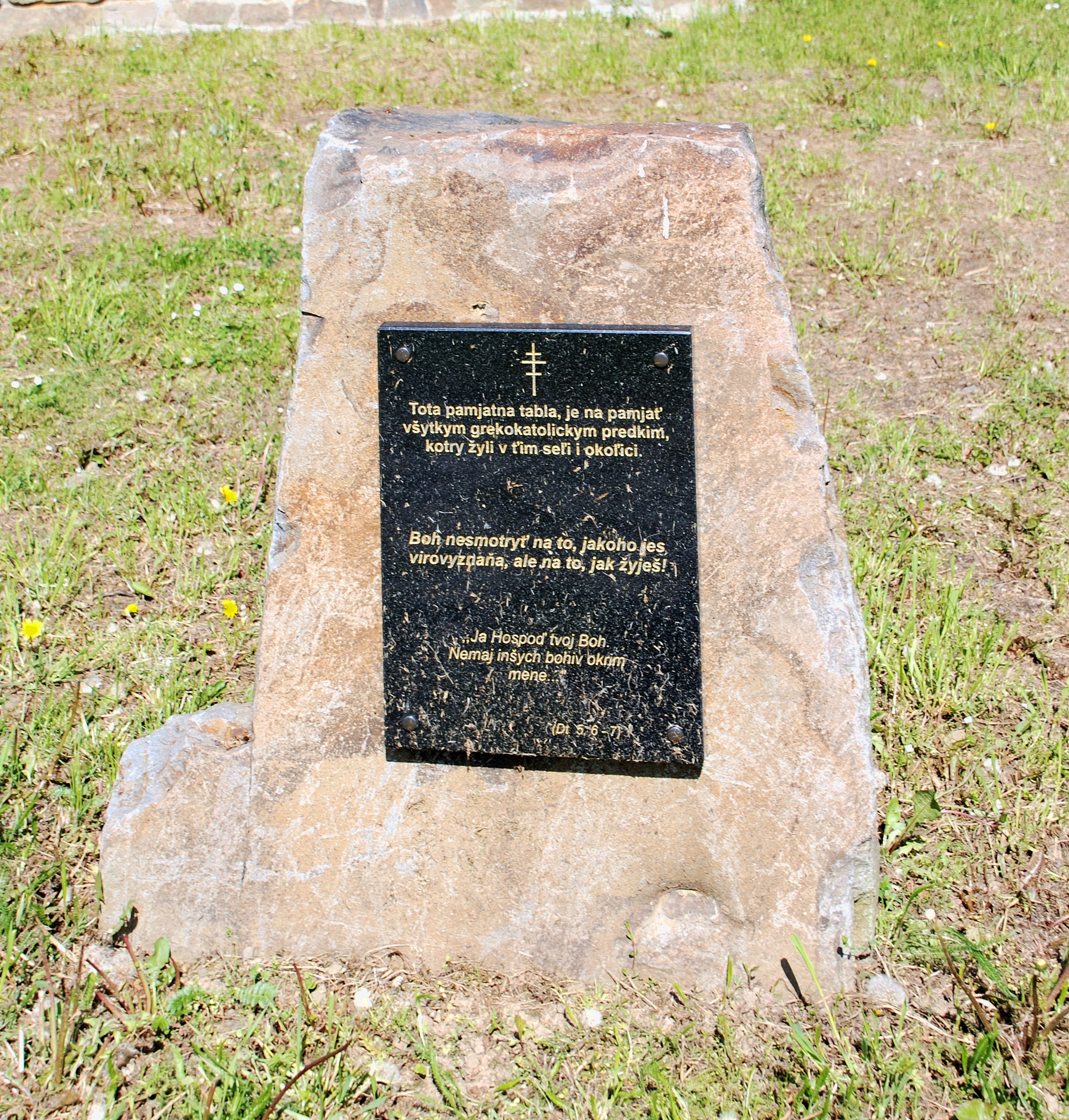
Dedication plaque next to the Church of Saint Nicholas in Habura

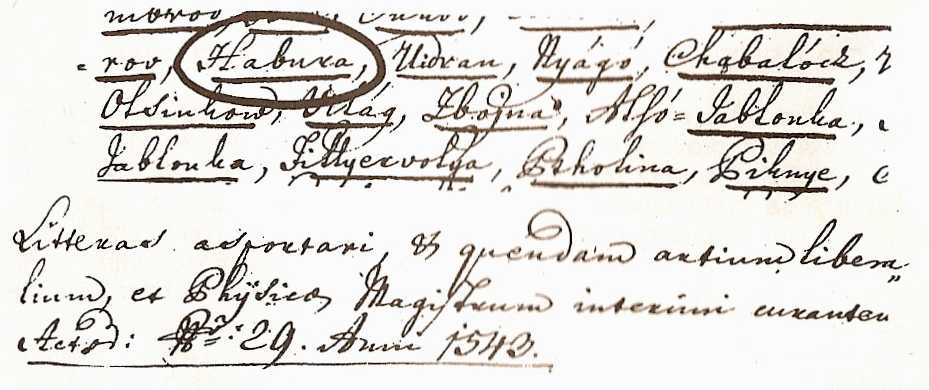
First written record of Habura from 1543

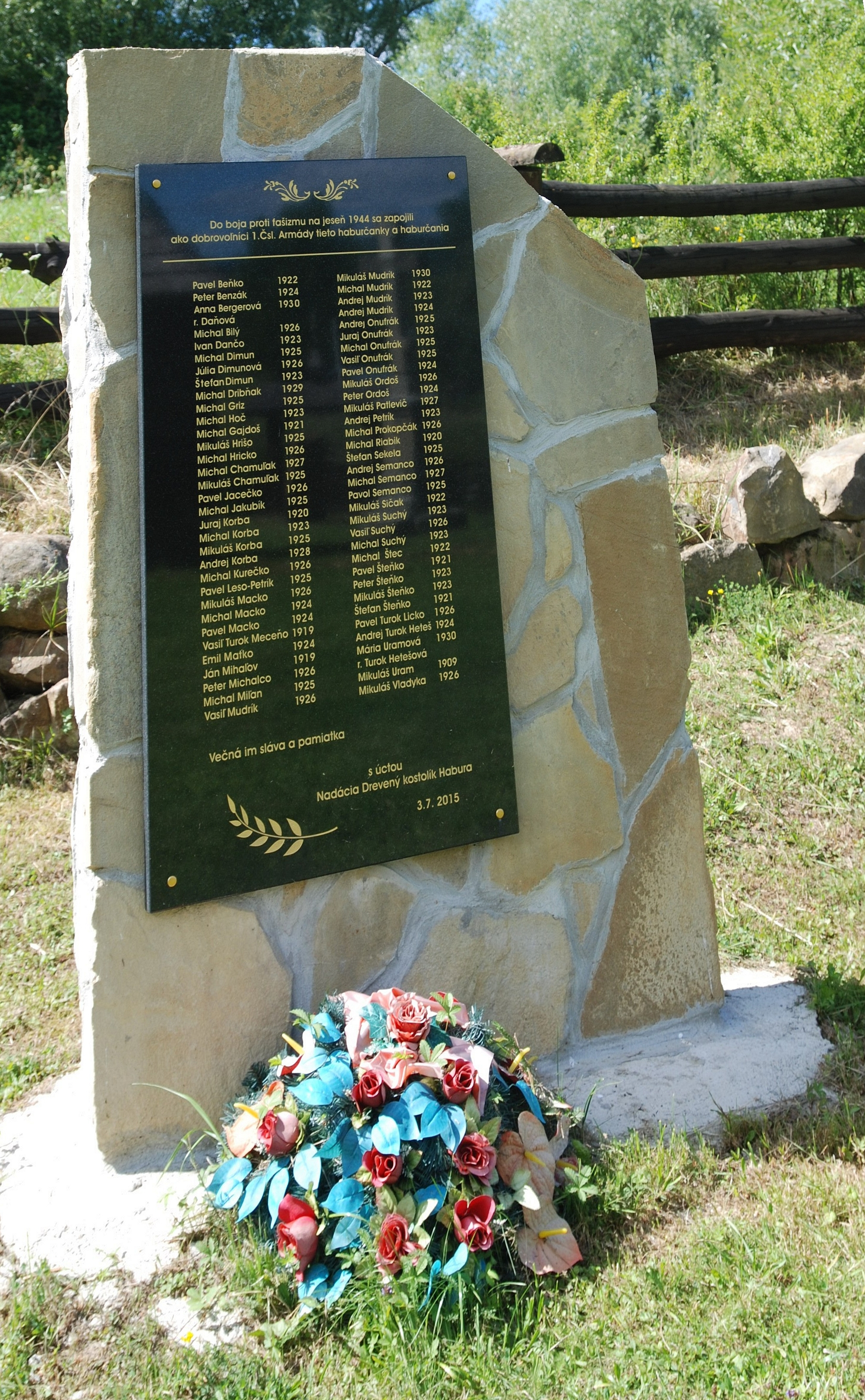
Memorial to WWII victims from Habura

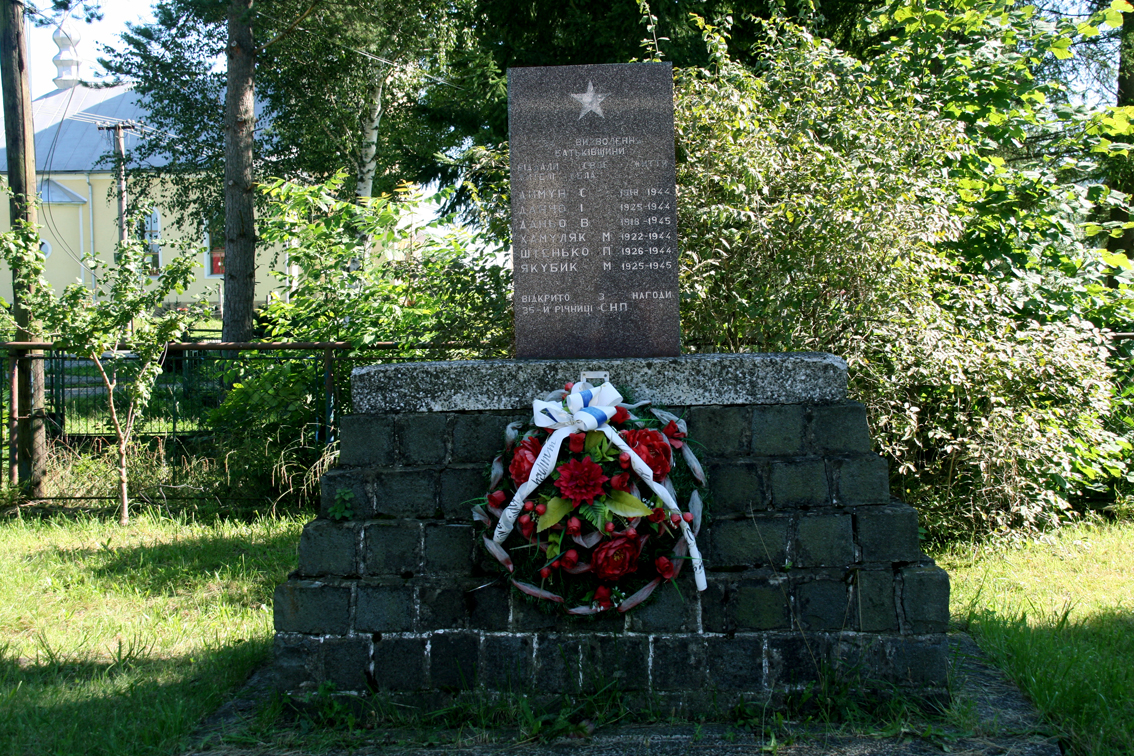
Memorial to the Slovak National Uprising in Habura

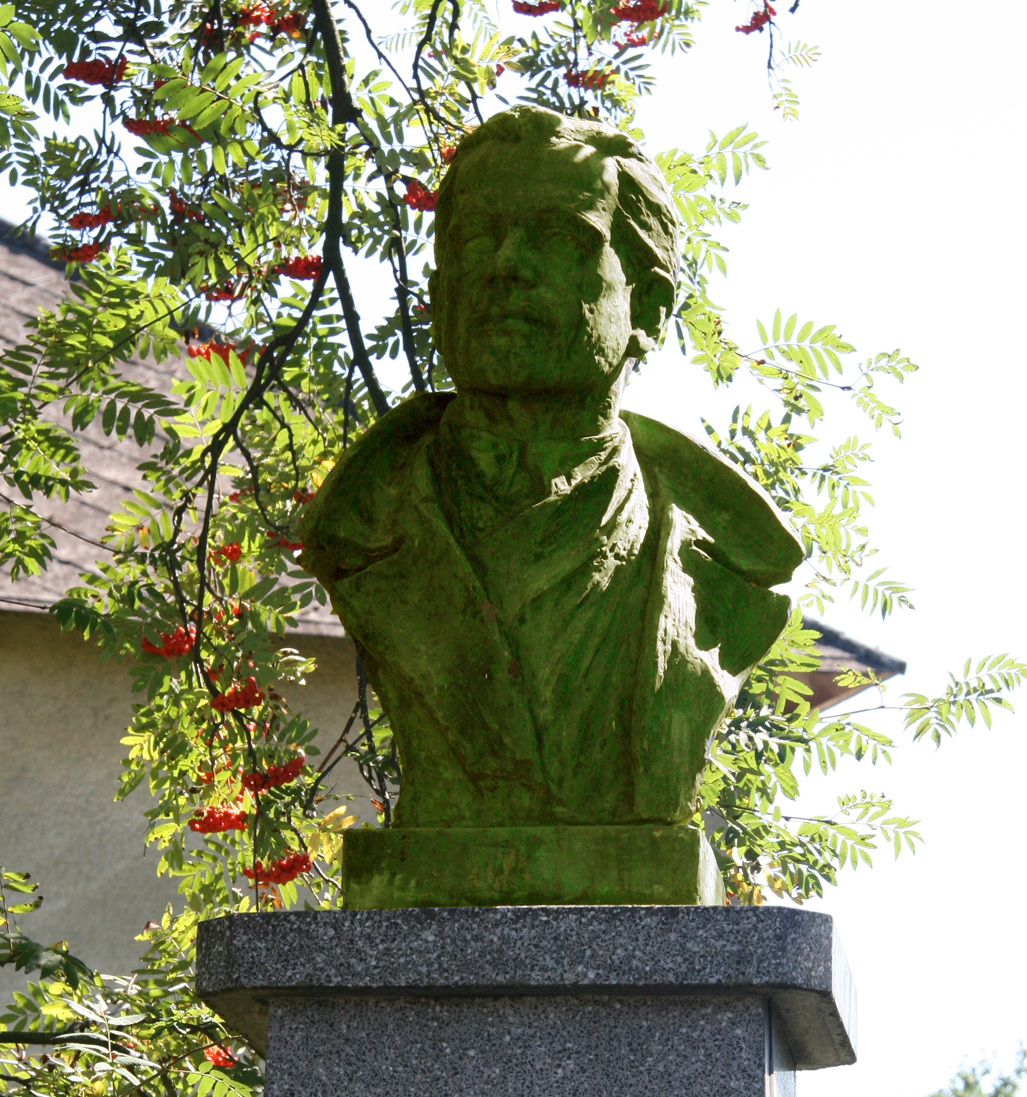
Cpt. Ľudovít Kukorelli memorial bust in Habura

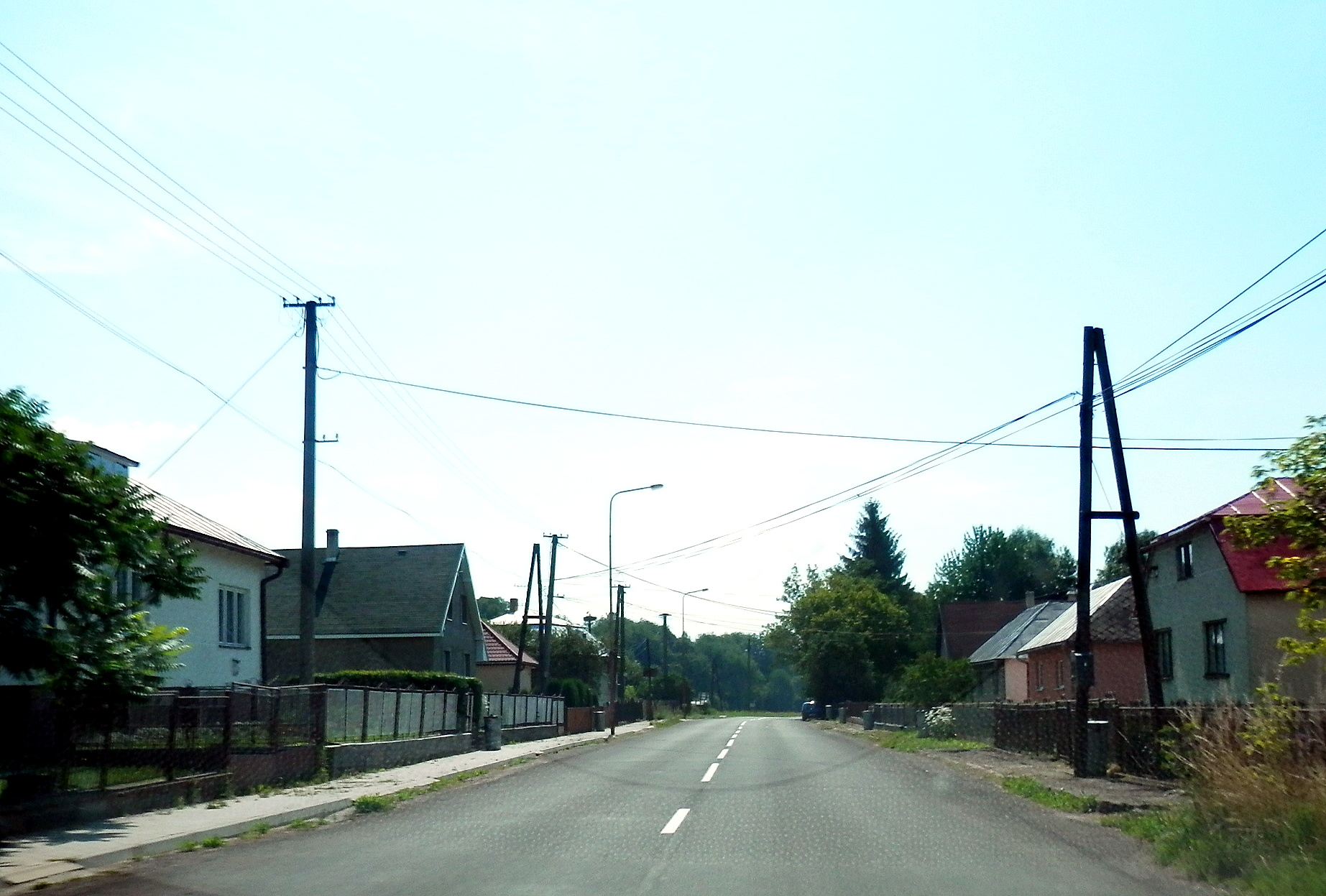
A street in Habura

A view of Habura at noon (August 2016)

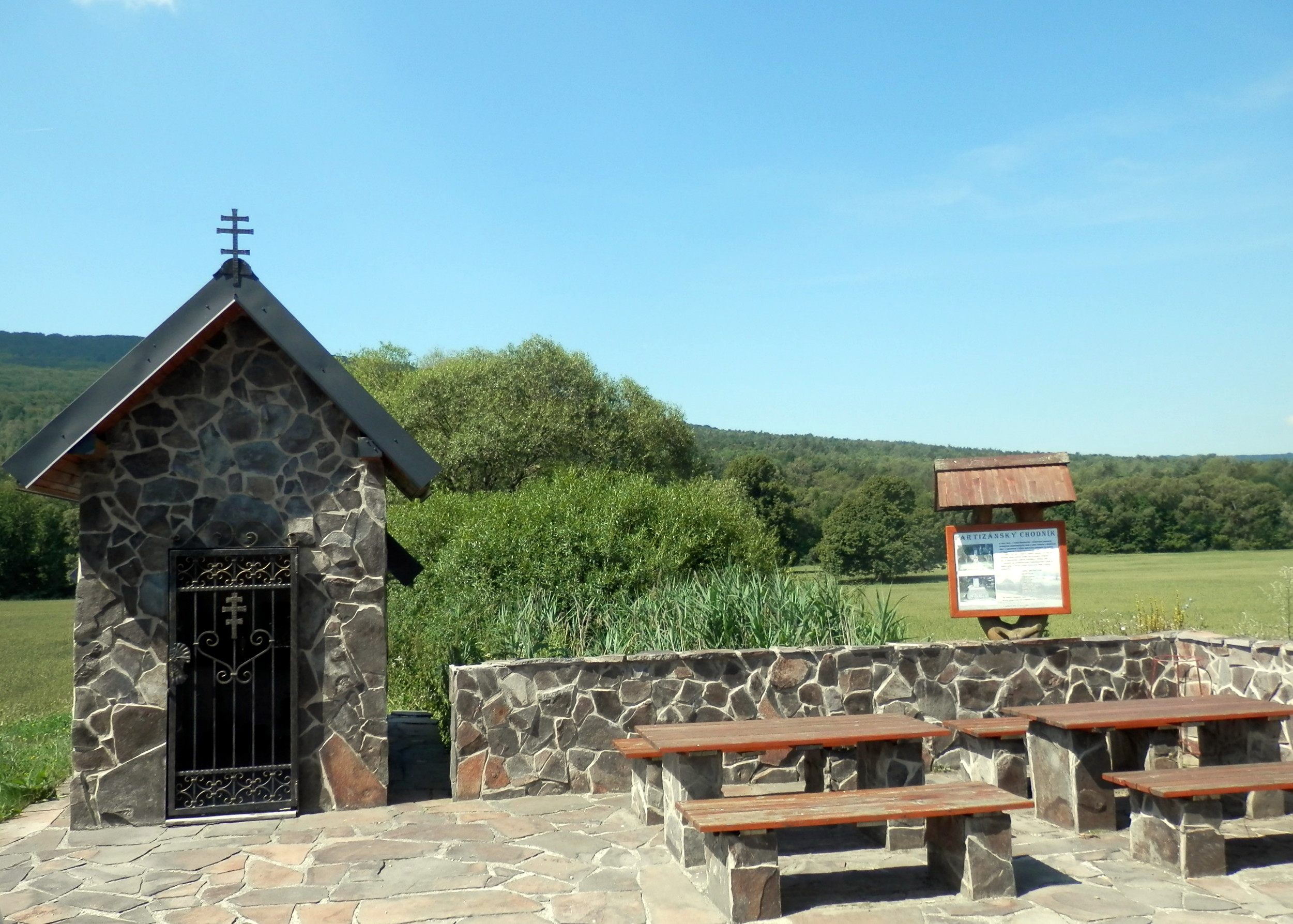
Small chapel, resting area and stopover of a local Slovak National Uprising educational trail

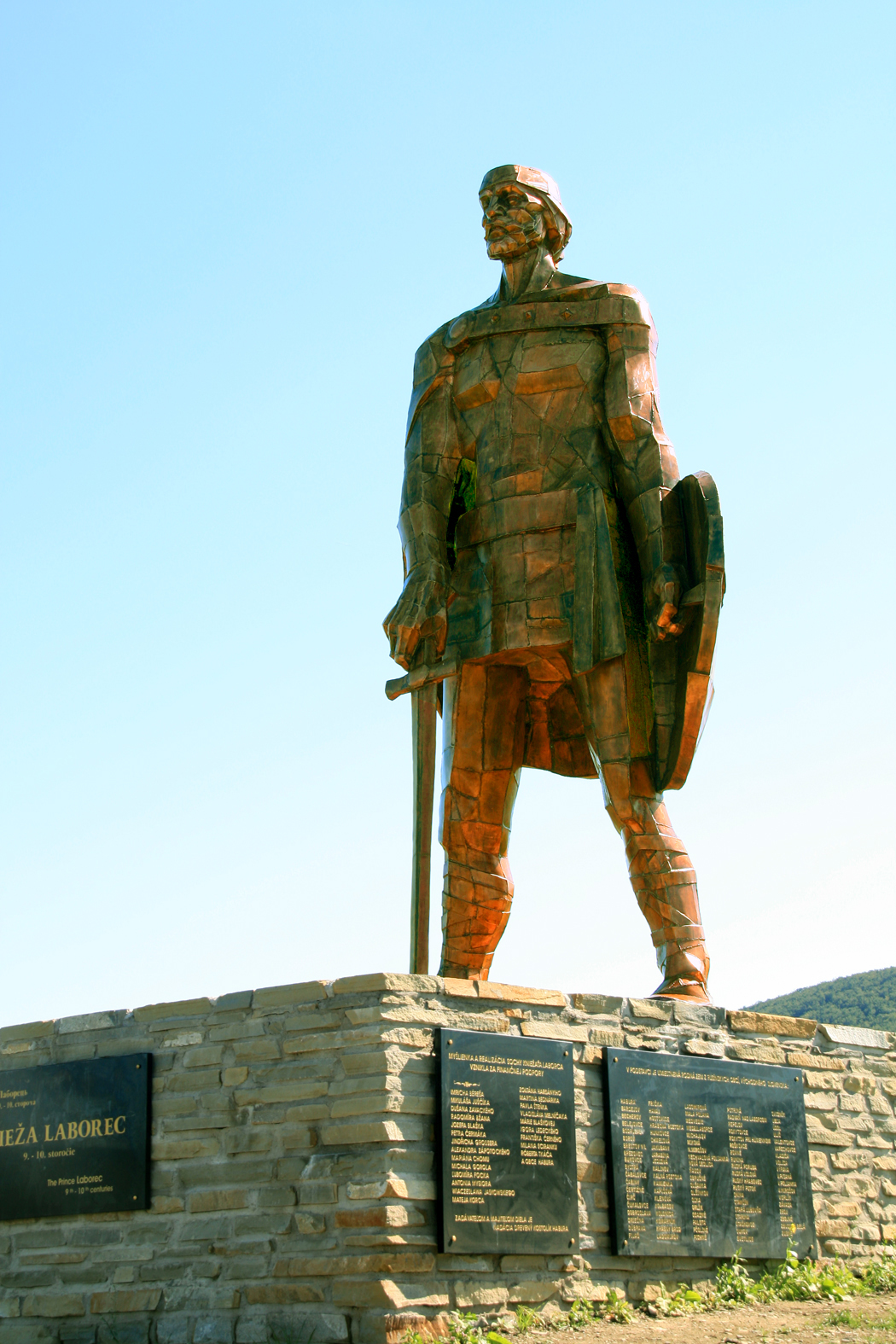
A statue of legendary early medieval prince Laborec on a hill near the village

== See also ==
- List of municipalities and towns in Slovakia
