= Przybyszów, Podkarpackie Voivodeship =

Lemko village in Poland

Przybyszów Прибишів
- Village
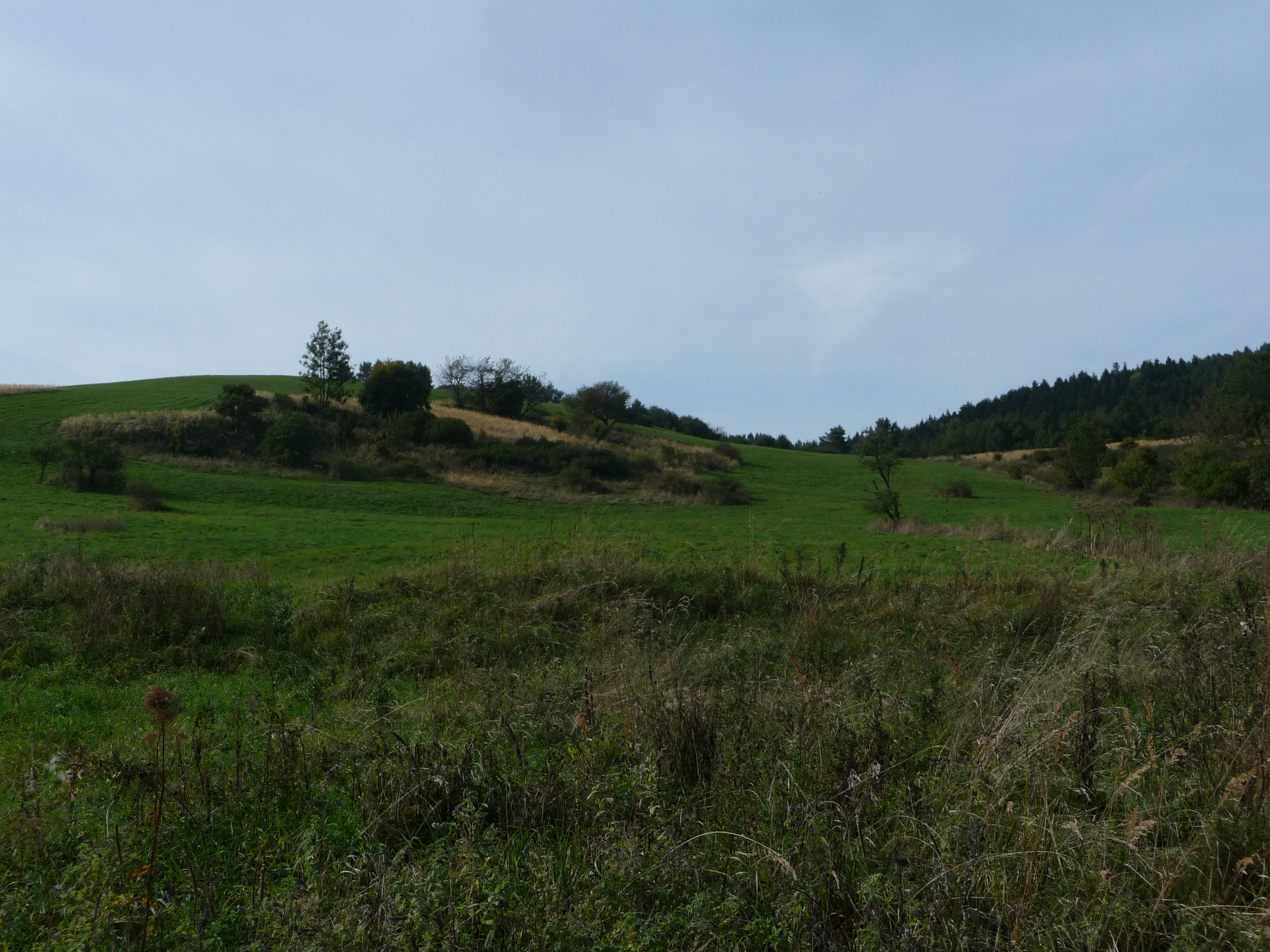
- Land along the main road of Przybyszów

- Location within Poland
- Coordinates: 49°25′N 22°3′E
- Country: Poland
- Voivodeship: Subcarpathian
- County: Sanok
- Gmina: Bukowsko
- Time zone: UTC+1 (CET)
  - Summer (DST): UTC+2 (CEST)

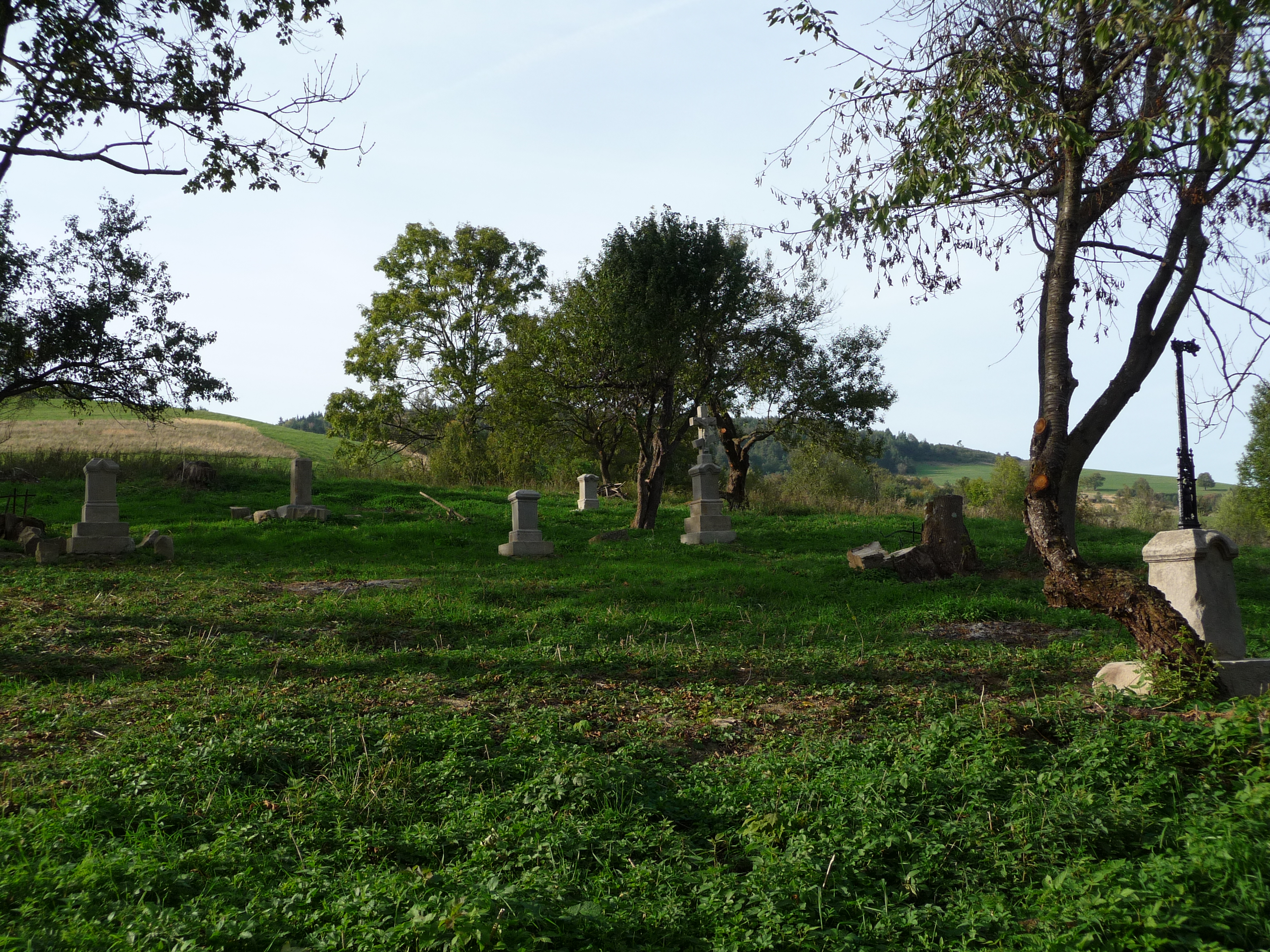
Main cemetery in Przybyszów

Przybyszów [pʂɨˈbɨʂuf] is a former village in the administrative district of Gmina Bukowsko, within Sanok County, Subcarpathian Voivodeship, in south-eastern Poland.

== History ==
The village was established in 1553, and there were several subsequent waves of settlement, notably In 1589, 1699, and 1748. The name "Przybyszow" derives from a word meaning "newcomer" or "stranger". The village was located on land previously owned by the Polish nobleman Nicholas Herburt Odnowski since 1539 (More history, in Polish, about Odnowski can be found at this link In the year 1898, the village had 393 inhabitants and 62 houses, the village area was 6.37 km (4 mi). It was owned at that time by a Polish noble family named Scibor-Rylski. From November 1918 to January 1919, it was part of the Komańcza Republic. The village ceased to exist after World War II, when the entire population was deported to Ukraine as part of Soviet and Polish population exchange operations. (UPA sotnias (units) had been stationed in this village, and the village was subsequently burned.) None of the original structures exist, although excavation would likely reveal their foundations.

=== Names ===
Przybyszow, meaning "Outsiders" or "Newcomers" – A now non-existent village in the municipality Bukowsko in Sanok County, Subcarpathian province of Southeast Poland.

=== Architecture ===
The village is located along a stream called Płonka, which is a tributary of the Osława River, bordered on the other side by the village Płonna. Homes were situated along the brook valley, on the northeastern slope of forested mountain range (up Tokarnia 777 m above sea level) forming the watershed between Osława and Wisłok.

=== Religion ===
At the turn of the 20th century, the Lemko residents of the village belonged to the St. Paraskevia Greek Catholic parish in Karlikow (of which Alexei Malarchyk was the priest), although there was a filial (or branch/daughter) church in the village. The smaller village of Wola Piotrowa was also part of that parish. Roman Catholics (Poles) belonged to the Bukowsko parish.

== Tourism ==
- Hiking Tours - Puławy - Tokarnia (778m) - Przybyszów - Kamienne (717m) - Komańcza
