= Operation Vistula =

1947 forced ethnic population resettlement in Poland

- Part of Polish–Ukrainian conflict (1939–1947)
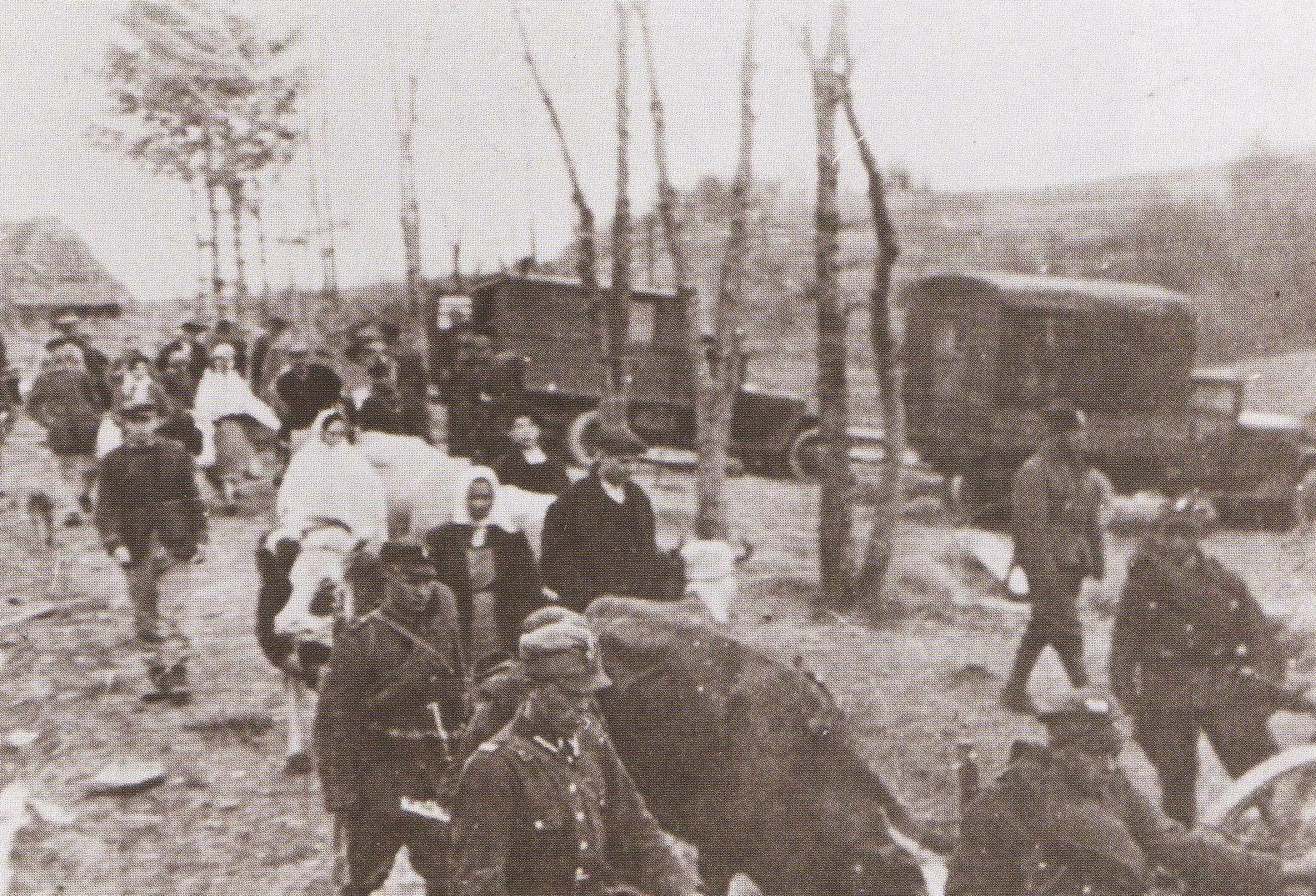
- Deportation of Ukrainians by the Polish People's Army during Operation Vistula
Date	28 April – 31 July 1947
Location	Bieszczady and Low Beskids
Result	Polish victory; Complete liquidation of UPA in Polish territories; Mass deportations of Ukrainian civilians

Belligerents
Polish People's Republic	Ukrainian Insurgent Army

Commanders and leaders
Bolesław Bierut; Stefan Mossor	Yaroslav Starukh Myroslav Onyshkevych Martin Mizerny Ivan Shpontak (AWOL) ...and others

Casualties and losses
Unknown	1,135-1,509 killed and wounded 2,800 captured
- 141,000 civilians deported 2,780 civilians were detained under suspicion of collaboration with UPA of which 173 were executed 4,000 civilians taken to Jaworzno prison camp

Operation Vistula (Polish: Akcja Wisła; Ukrainian: Опера́ція «Ві́сла», romanized: Operatsiya "Visla") was the codename for the 1947 ethnic cleansing, deportation and forced resettlement of close to 150,000 Ukrainians, Rusyns, Boykos, and Lemkos from the southeastern provinces of postwar Poland to the Recovered Territories in the north and west of the country. The action was carried out by the Soviet-installed Polish communist authorities to remove material support to the Ukrainian Insurgent Army. The Ukrainian Insurgent Army continued its guerrilla activities until 1947 in Subcarpathian and Lublin Voivodeships with no hope for any peaceful resolution; Operation Vistula brought an end to the hostilities.

In a period of three months beginning on 28 April 1947 and with Soviet approval and aid about 141,000 civilians residing around Bieszczady, Low Beskids and most of Zakerzonia were deported to former German territories, ceded to Poland at the Yalta Conference at the end of World War II.

The operation was named after the Vistula River, Wisła in Polish; Polish and Ukrainian politicians as well as historians condemned the operation following the 1989 fall of communism in Eastern Europe and described it as ethnic cleansing Others argued that no other means of stopping the violence existed since partisans used to regroup outside Polish borders.

At the same time the Soviet Union carried out a parallel action, Operation West (Operatsiia Zakhid, or Operatsiya Zapad), in the Ukrainian SSR. Although both operations were coordinated from Moscow, there was a difference in their results. Operation West was conducted in West Ukraine by the Soviet NKVD and targeted the families of suspected UPA members. Over 114,000 individuals, mostly women and children, were deported to the Kazakh SSR and Siberia and forced into extreme poverty. Of the 19,000 adult males deported by the NKVD, most were sent to coal mines and stone quarries in the north. None of those deported by the NKVD received any farms or empty homes to live in.

== Background ==
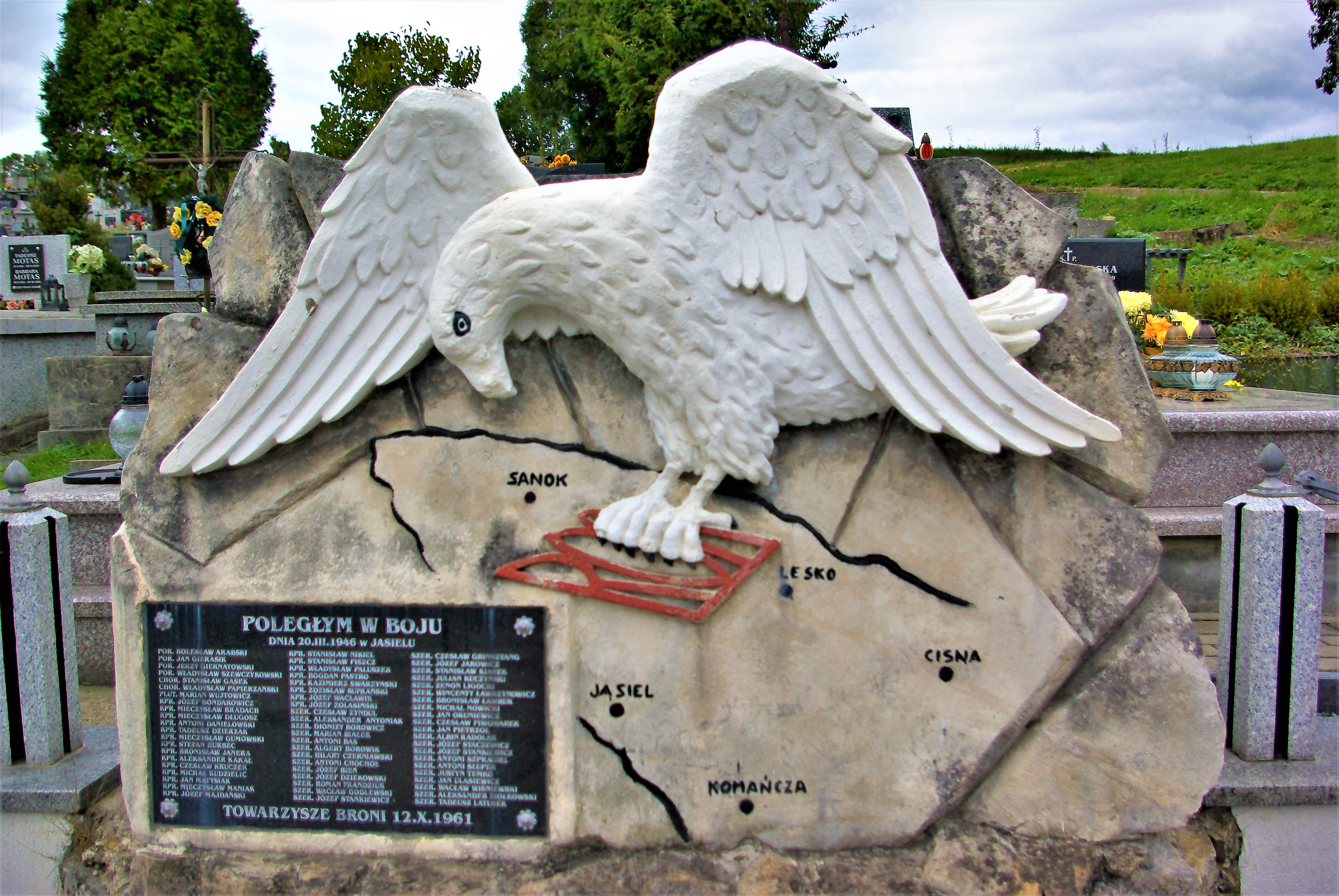
Monument to Polish soldiers killed by UPA in Jasiel, south-eastern Poland, in 1946

The goal of the operation was to suppress the Ukrainian Insurgent Army (UPA), which had been fighting the Polish People's Army (LWP) in the southeast of Poland. The original codename of the operation was Akcja Wschód (Operation East), similar to Operation West (Akcja Zachód) conducted by the NKVD on the Soviet side of the border. It is sometimes assumed that the cause for Operation Vistula was the assassination on 28 March 1947 of the Polish communist General Karol Świerczewski in an ambush set up by the UPA.

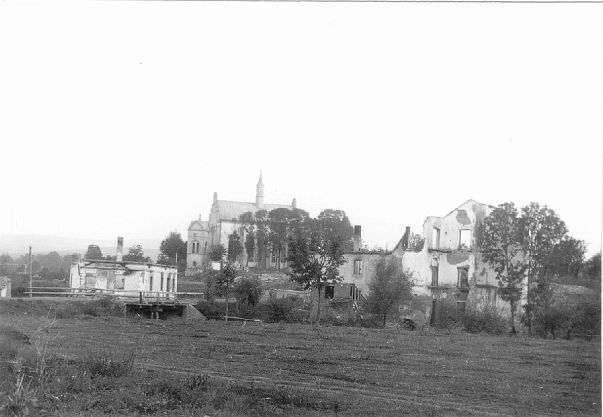
The village of Bukowsko burned down by the UPA in 1946

About 12 hours after the incident, the Polish Soviet-sponsored authorities made the decision to deport all Ukrainians and Lemkos. It is known that preparations for Operation Vistula had started in January 1947, if not earlier. On 10 September 1947 the Supreme Soviet of the Soviet Union issued an Order No. 3214-1050, for the deportation of all Ukrainian families of alleged UPA members to Siberia. Between 1945 and 1947 over 126,000 Ukrainians were apprehended by the NKVD and almost 32,000 of the Ukrainian underground were killed, attesting to the continuity of the same Soviet policy from before 1947.

In the aftermath of the death of Karol Świerczewski, Lieutenant Colonel Wacław Kossowski, though concluding that the identity of the assailants responsible for Świerczewski's death was 'impossible to determine', nonetheless advised the Polish general staff on 11 April "As soon as possible, an Operational Group should be organized, which would elaborate a plan to include among other matters the complete extermination of the remnants of the Ukrainian population in the southeastern border region of Poland".

On April 16, 1947, the Minister of Public Security (MBP) divisional general Stanisław Radkiewicz and Marshal Michał Rola-Żymierski, the Minister of National Defence, issued the operative and organization plan for an operation named Akcja Wschód ('Operation East') articulating the goal of the operation as "To solve the Ukrainian problem in Poland once and for all" and instructing the participants to "Conduct evacuation from the southern and eastern border region of all the people of Ukrainian descent...and settle them in the north-western territories of Poland in the highest possible degree of scattering...".

== Action participants ==
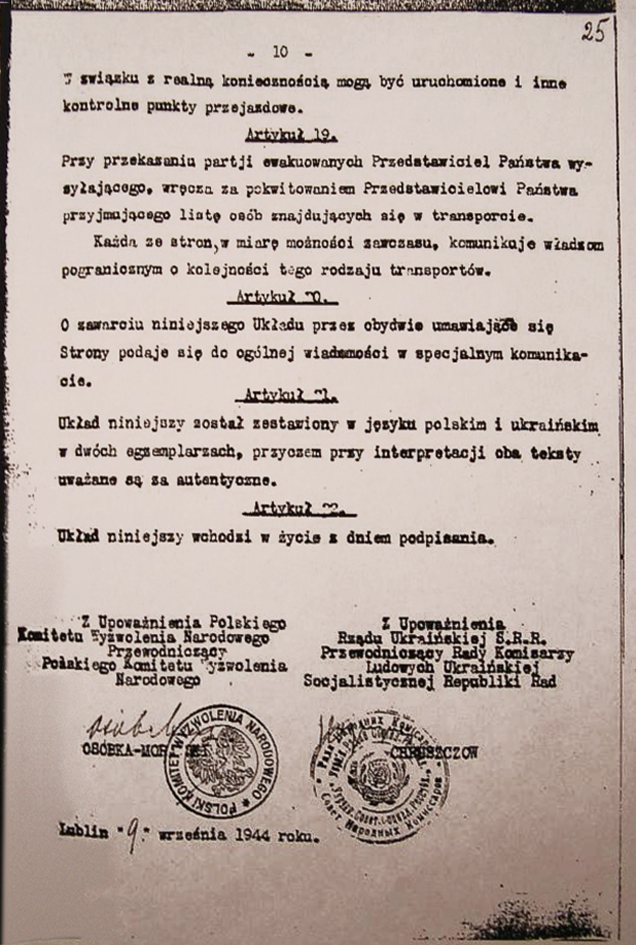
Signature page of Polish-Ukrainian repatriation agreement signed by Khrushchev, 1944

The operation was carried out by the Operational Group Vistula consisting of about 20,000 personnel commanded by General Stefan Mossor. The group included soldiers of the Polish People's Army and the Internal Security Corps, as well as functionaries of the police Milicja Obywatelska and the Security Service Urząd Bezpieczeństwa. At 4am on 28 April 1947, six divisions of the Polish army surrounded the villages of southeastern Poland that were inhabited by Ukrainians. In a commensurate action, Soviet internal security forces and Czechoslovak border guards blocked the eastern and southern borders of Poland, preventing the deportees from fleeing.

Initially, the expellees comprised about 20,000 Ukrainians. With time, the total number grew to 80,000 and eventually to close to 150,000 inhabitants of Polesie, Roztocze, Pogórze Przemyskie, Bieszczady, Low Beskid, Beskid Sądecki, and Ruś Szlachtowska.

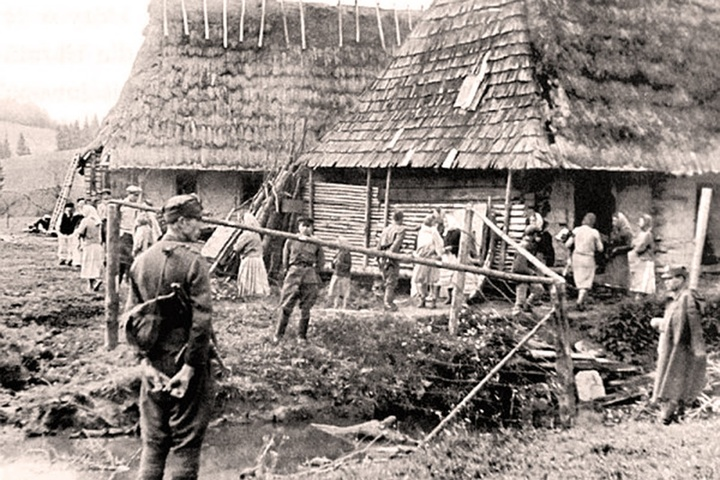
Resettlement of Ukrainians in 1947

The expellees were resettled over a wide area in the Northern and Western Territories assigned to Poland by the Potsdam Agreement including Warmia and Masuria.

A consequence of Operation Vistula was the almost total depopulation of Pogórze Przemyskie, Bieszczady and Beskid Niski coupled with the NKVD-led forcible repatriation of Ukrainians from Poland to the Soviet Union (the Ukrainian SSR and Siberia) in 1944–46. The relocation of the population put the UPA forces in Poland in the most difficult position; deprived of humans and other resources, the outnumbered Ukrainian partisans were unable to uphold their armed resistance against the communist forces. Nevertheless, the UPA remained active for a few more years. After the last relocations, UPA's activities on Polish territory died out. Some Ukrainian partisans fled to Western Europe, notably to West Germany, and the United States.

== Process of deportation ==
A principle of 'collective responsibility' was applied–all Ukrainians within the indicted area of Poland were deported regardless of political leanings, alliances and historical affiliations. Polish authorities decided to resettle "every person of Ukrainian nationality". Mixed families, communities that did not support UPA, Lemkos returning from Red Army service, "even loyal party members trained in the Soviet Union, even communists who helped 'repatriate' Ukrainians in the previous wave, were forcibly resettled." Nationality was not decided by 'individual choice' but by religion, language and "frequently by the letter 'U' in the Kennkarte Polish citizens received from the Nazi occupation during the war".

Those who resisted deportation were imprisoned in the Jaworzno prison camp in Silesia. In total 3,936 Ukrainians were imprisoned in Jaworzno camp, a war time affiliate of the Auschwitz-Birkenau complex. Of the near 4,000 Ukrainians taken to Jaworzno camp, 823 were women and children. Torture, typhus epidemics and additional exigencies resulted in the several deaths and suicides in the camp. Military tribunals were also to judge civilians and sentenced to death 173 Ukrainians on the spot during Operation Vistula.

The Ukrainians were transported in compact cattle and box cars, sanitary conditions were poor and food supplies irregular, some deportees died during transit. Ukrainians were packed into trains for Lublin or Oswiecim, where they were rerouted to their places of settlement. The final destination and degree of dispersal of groups was determined by the judgement of the intelligence officers, whose colleagues were waiting to receive their instruction in sealed envelopes at the end of the line.

== Events ==
The deportations occurred in stages. Poland and the Soviet Ukraine conducted population exchanges resulting from bilateral agreements signed on 9 September 1944 and 16 August 1945. The first transfers occurred at the end of World War II. The Poles who resided east of the newly established borders were deported to new Poland over three years. In 1944 the expulsion from Ukraine involved 117,000 Poles officially. In 1945 the number swelled to 512,000 Poles. In 1946 the total was 158,500 Poles from the Ukrainian SSR alone.

Some 482,000 Ukrainians were deported to the Ukrainian SSR between September 1944 and April 1946, although some 300,000 remained in their native settlements within the borders of Poland. Many Ukrainians as well as tens of thousands of Poles (ca. 200,000 persons or more) fled from southeastern Poland to central Poland between 1944 and 1945 independently of treaties due to the ethnic cleansing by the Bandera faction.

Operation Vistula occurred within the Polish national borders. The transfer involved persons who were internally relocated as citizens of the country. The final relocation of Ukrainians and Poles between the state borders occurred in 1951, when Poland was forced by the Soviet Union to adjust the border in the upper San River area and in the Belz area for economic reasons. Poland gave up rich deposits of coal including the city of Bełz that was in Poland, and in exchange, was assigned a stretch of barren land with low quality soil and no natural resources east of the San River and south of Przemyśl. The new Soviet acquisitions went to Ukraine, and populations were exchanged. Following the transfer of land, the Soviets built large coal mines there with the total capacity of 15 million tons annually.

== Conditions upon resettlement ==
Living standards were harsh for the deported Ukrainians, as deportees were refused compensation for the property and land they were forced to leave behind and because communities and families were separated across the four provinces of Olsztyn, Szczecin, Wrocław and Gdańsk, carefully dispersed so that the Ukrainian deportees did not constitute more than 10% of the local population. The expedited plan approved by Civil Security Minister Brigadier General Radkevych and Marshal Zhymerski instructed "Conduct evacuation from the Southern and Eastern border region of all the people of Ukrainian descent...and settle them in the north-western territories of Poland in the highest possible degree of scattering...".

Ukrainians were faced with largely decrepit accommodations, as most habitable buildings in the 'recovered territories' had recently been moved into by newly repatriated Poles after the 1944 Polish-Soviet population transfers.

They received financial credits and material help from the government, including grain shipments and other foodstuffs. Dr Zbigniew Palski writes that new homes were renovated with public funds; in Olsztyn Voivodeship 2,427 houses were rebuilt by the state, in Szczecin Voivodeship, only 717 although the needs were exponentially greater: reaching 10,000 households, far beyond the available state budget. Most of their personal debts, however, were remitted in the following years.

== Situation of Lemkos in Poland ==
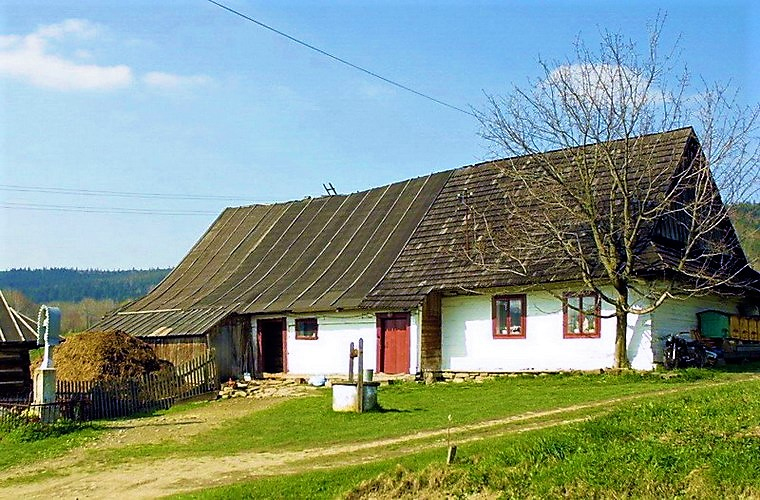
Lemko house in Nowica

Some five thousand Lemko families returned to their home regions in south-eastern Poland in 1957 and 1958. While the Polish census of 2003 shows only 5,800 Lemkos (self-identification), there are estimates that up to 100,000 Lemkos in total live in Poland today, and up to 10,000 of them in the area known as Lemkovyna. The largest communities of Lemkos live in the villages Łosie, Krynica, Nowica, Zdynia, Gładyszów, Hańczowa, Zyndranowa, Uście Gorlickie, Bartne, Bielanka, and in the eastern part of Lemkovyna – Wysoczany, Mokre, Morochów, Szczawne, Kulaszne, Rzepedź, Turzańsk, Komańcza. They also live in the town of Sanok and the cities of Nowy Sącz and Gorlice.

== Legacy ==
On 3 August 1990, the Polish Senate adopted a resolution condemning the postwar Polish government's Operation Vistula. In response, the Ukrainian Parliament (Verkhovna Rada) adopted the statement of understanding of the Polish Senate resolution as a serious step towards the correction of the injustices towards the Ukrainians in Poland. In the same resolution the Rada condemned the criminal acts of the Stalinist regime towards the Polish people.

On 18 April 2002 in Krasiczyn, Polish president Aleksander Kwaśniewski expressed regret over Operation Vistula. The president described the operation as the symbol of harm against Ukrainians committed by the communist authorities. "Speaking on behalf of the Republic of Poland I want to express regret to all those wronged by the operation" - Kwaśniewski wrote in a letter to the National Remembrance Institute (IPN) and participants in the conference on the 1947 Operation Vistula and openly rejected the notion that it should in any way be linked to earlier events in Volhynia. "It was believed for years that the Vistula operation was the revenge for slaughter of Poles by the UPA forces in the east in the years 1943-1944. Such attitude is wrong and cannot be accepted. The Vistula operation should be condemned."

In 2007, president of Poland Lech Kaczyński and president of Ukraine Viktor Yushchenko condemned the operation as a violation of human rights. President Yushchenko also noted that the operation was executed by and was the responsibility of a "totalitarian communist regime".

On 17 July 2024, the Warsaw District Court overturned the prior conclusion of the Polish Institute of National Remembrance (IPN) that the deportations were not repressive, and ordered the IPN to reopen the investigation of Operation Vistula.

== See also ==
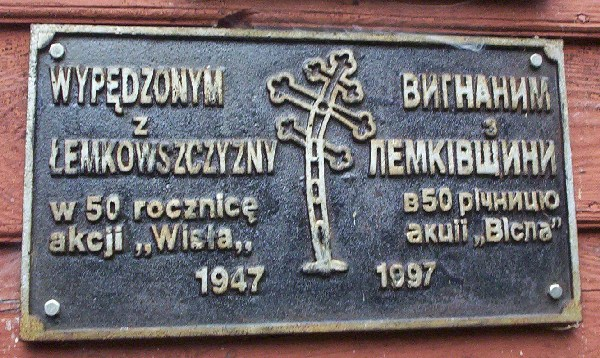
Inscription in Polish and Ukrainian at a church in Beskid Niski, Poland: "In memory of those expelled from Lemkivshchyna, on the 50th anniversary of Operation Vistula, 1947–1997"

- Ukrainian nationalism
- Massacres of Poles in Volhynia and Eastern Galicia
- Minorities in Poland after the Second World War
- Population exchange between Poland and Soviet Ukraine
- Ukrainian liberation movement (1920–1950)
