= Lemkos =

East Slavic ethnic group

- Flag of Polish Lemkos

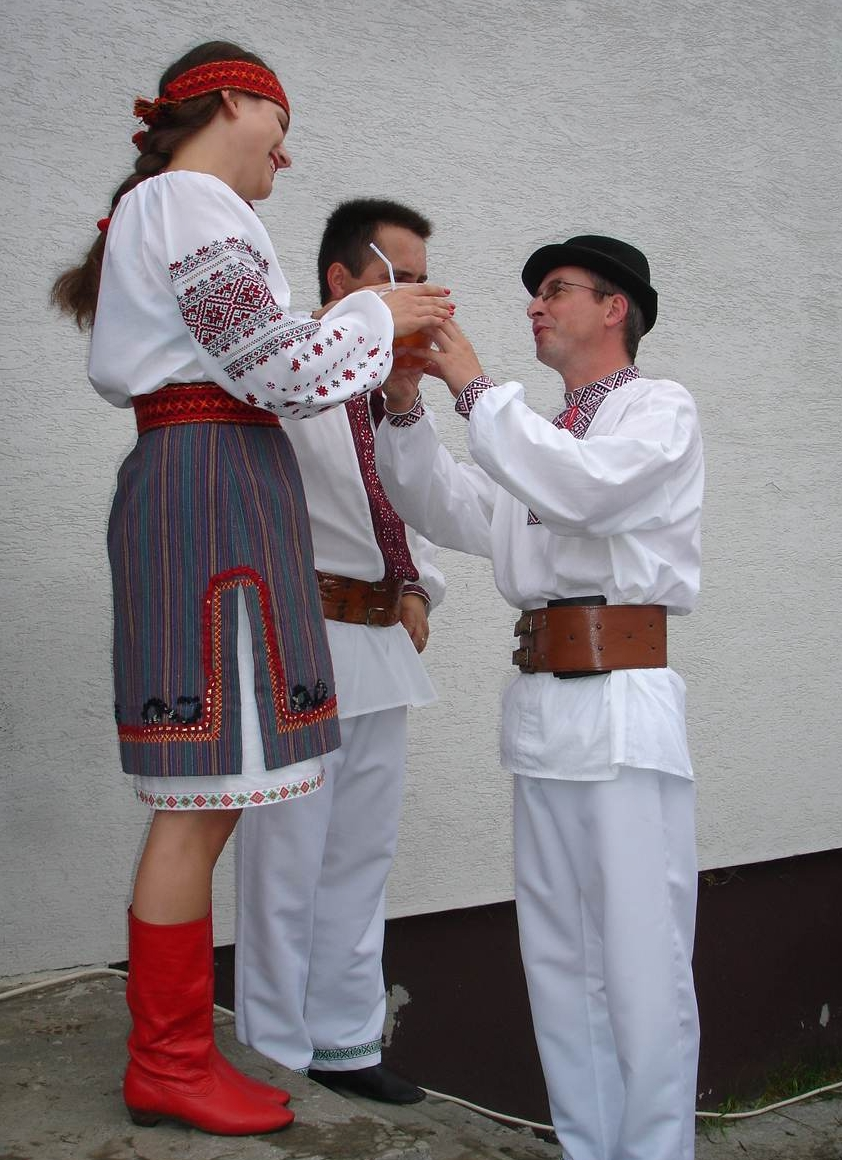
- Members of the folk group Osławianie from Mokre in stylized not authentic Lemko highlander folk costumes

Total population
- 75,228; 700,000 (ancestry)

Regions with significant populations
- Slovakia: 63,556 (2021) (Note: Listed as Rusyns; includes 23,746 as primary ethnicity and 39,810 as secondary ethnicity.); 100,000 (ancestry)
- Poland: 11,000 (2011); 100,000 (ancestry)
- Ukraine: 672 (census 2001); 350,000 (ancestry)
- North America: 150,000 (ancestry)
- Post-Yugoslavia states: 50,000 (ancestry)

Languages
- Rusyn, Slovak, Polish, Ukrainian (Lemko dialect)

Religion
- Predominantly Ruthenian Greek Catholic, Ukrainian Greek Catholic or Eastern Orthodox, with Roman Catholic minorities

Related ethnic groups
- Rusyns, Boykos, Hutsuls, Ukrainians, Vlachs, Romanians, Slovak Horals, Polish Górals and Polish Pogórzans, Hungarians from Transylvania, Hungarians from Slovakia and Hungarians from Transcarpathia

Lemkos (Rusyn: лeмкы, romanized: lemkŷ; Polish: Łemkowie; Ukrainian: лемки, romanized: lemky; Slovak: Lemkovia) are an ethnic group inhabiting the Lemko Region (Rusyn: Лемковина, romanized: Lemkovyna; Ukrainian: Лемківщина, romanized: Lemkivshchyna) of Carpathian Rus', an ethnographic region in the Carpathian Mountains and foothills spanning Ukraine, Slovakia, and Poland.

Lemkos are often considered to be a sub-group of Rusyns. Members of these groups have historically also been given other designations, such as Verkhovyntsi ("highlanders"). Among people of the Carpathian highlands, communities speaking the same dialect will identify with a different ethnic label when crossing borders due to the influence of state-sponsored education and media. As well, the same community may switch its preferred identification over time. In Slovakia, between the 1991 and 2001 censuses, the number of people identifying as "Ukrainian" declined by 2,467 (an 18.6% decrease), while those reporting Rusyn as their national identity increased by 7,004 people (a 40.6% increase). It is not clear, however, if this refers to the same individuals switching their identification, more young first-time respondents choosing Rusyn, or migration.

The spoken language of the Lemkos, which has a code of rue under ISO 639-3, has been variously described as a language in its own right, a dialect of Ukrainian, or a dialect of Rusyn. In Ukraine, almost all Lemkos speak both Lemko and standard Ukrainian (according to the 2001 Ukrainian Census). Ukraine itself categorizes Lemkos as an ethnic subgroup of Ukrainians and not as a separate ethnicity.

In Poland’s 2021 census, 13,607 people identified as Lemkos, of these 7,364 identified as Lemkos only, 5,149 as Lemko-Polish, and 1,094 as Lemko and some other nationality, including Ukrainian. I.D. Liubchyk (І.Д.Любчик) cites the number of around 700 thousand people with Lemko ancestry in the world, out of which 350 thousand are in Ukraine, 150 thousand in North America, 100 thousand in Poland, 100 thousand in Slovakia, and 50 thousand in post-Yugoslavia states. During the 2001 Ukrainian census, Lemko identity was not researched (option not available in survey).

== Etymology ==
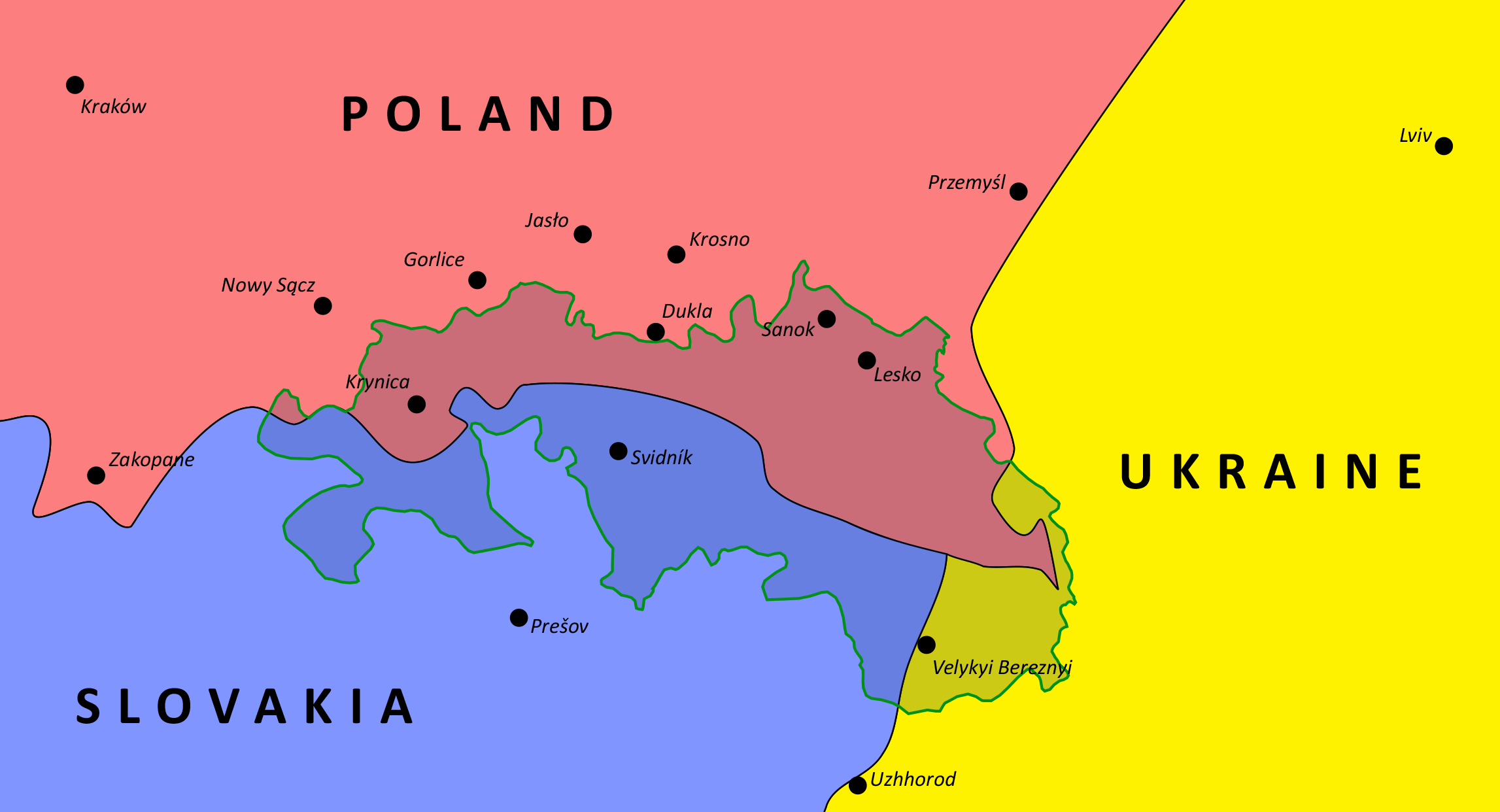
Map of the Lemko Region according to World federation of Ukrainian Lemko organizations

The ethnonym Lemko derives from the word lem (Rusyn: лем, lit. 'only'). The term is thought to have first originated as a nickname for users of the word lem in the borderlands between the Lemko and Boyko regions: the easternmost extent of usage of the word on the north side of the Carpathians. (On the south side of the Carpathians, the analogous nickname, lemak, was used in the lem-lyš isogloss area.) The ethnonym eventually entered use in academia and was first recorded in print with the 1834 publication of Grammatik der ruthenischen oder klein russischen Sprache in Galizien (lit. 'Grammar of Ruthenian or Little Russian Language in Galicia') by Yosyp Levytsky.

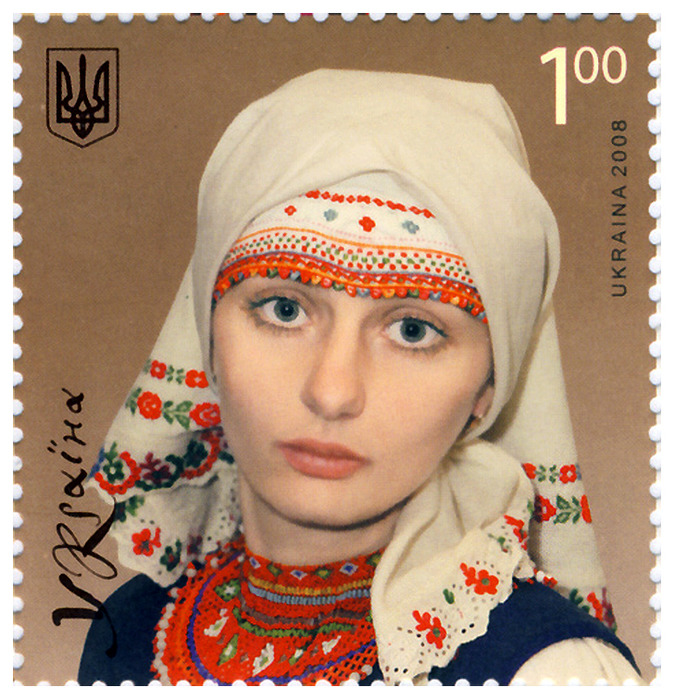
Ukrainian stamp featuring a Lemko woman, 2009.

As an endonym, Lemko only entered wider use in the early 20th century. Prior to adopting the name, Lemkos would refer to themselves as Rusyns (Rusyn: Русины, romanized: Rusynŷ) or Rusnaks (Rusyn: Руснaкы, Руснаци, romanized: Rusnakŷ, Rusnacy). By the interwar period the popularity of Lemko as an endonym had grown, and appeared in periodicals such as Lemko and Naš Lemko.

Polish authorities also played a hand in popular adoption of the term leading up to World War II. Concerned by the potential for Ukrainian nationalism in the region, authorities sought to encourage Rusyn identity to counter it. This led to promotion of the exaggerated historicity of Lemkos as a distinctive ethnographic group and of their corresponding ethnonym.

In the aftermath of World War II, Lemko finally supplanted Rusyn and Rusnak as the term of choice for the Rusyns on the north face of the Carpathians in Poland.

== Location ==
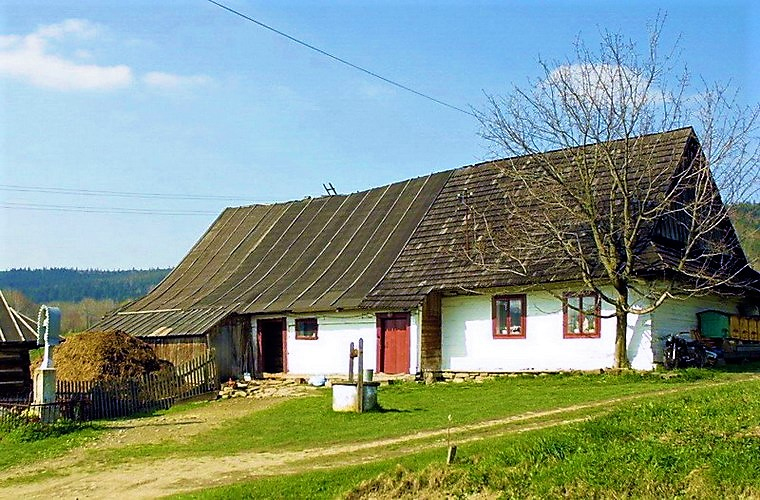
Lemko house in Nowica in present-day Poland

The Lemkos' homeland is commonly referred to as the Lemko Region (Rusyn: Лeмкoвина, romanized: Lemkovyna; Ukrainian: Лeмкiвщина, romanized: Lemkivshchyna; Polish: Łemkowszczyzna). Up until 1945, this included the area from the Poprad River in the west to the valley of Oslawa River in the east, areas situated primarily in present-day Poland, in the Lesser Poland and Subcarpathian Voivodeships (provinces). This part of the Carpathian mountains is mostly deforested, which allowed for an agrarian economy, alongside such traditional occupations as ox grazing and sheep herding.

The Lemko region became part of Poland in medieval Piast times. Lemkos were made part of the Austrian province of Galicia in 1772. This area was part of the Austro-Hungarian Empire until its dissolution in 1918, at which point the Lemko-Rusyn Republic (Ruska Lemkivska) declared its independence. Independence did not last long however, and the republic was incorporated into Poland in 1920.

As a result of the forcible deportation of Ukrainians from Poland to the Soviet Union after World War II, the majority of Lemkos in Poland were either resettled from their historic homeland to the prеviously German territories in the North-Western region of Poland or to the Ukrainian Soviet Socialist Republic. Only those Lemkos living the Prešov Region in present-day Slovakia continue to live on their ancestral lands, with the exception of some Lemkos who resettled in their homeland in the late 1950s and afterward. Lemkos are/were neighbours with Slovaks, Carpathian Germans and Lachy sądeckie (Poles) to the west, Pogorzans (Poles) and Dolinians (a Rusyn subgroup) to the north, Boykos (a Ukrainians subgroup) to the east, and Slovaks to the south.

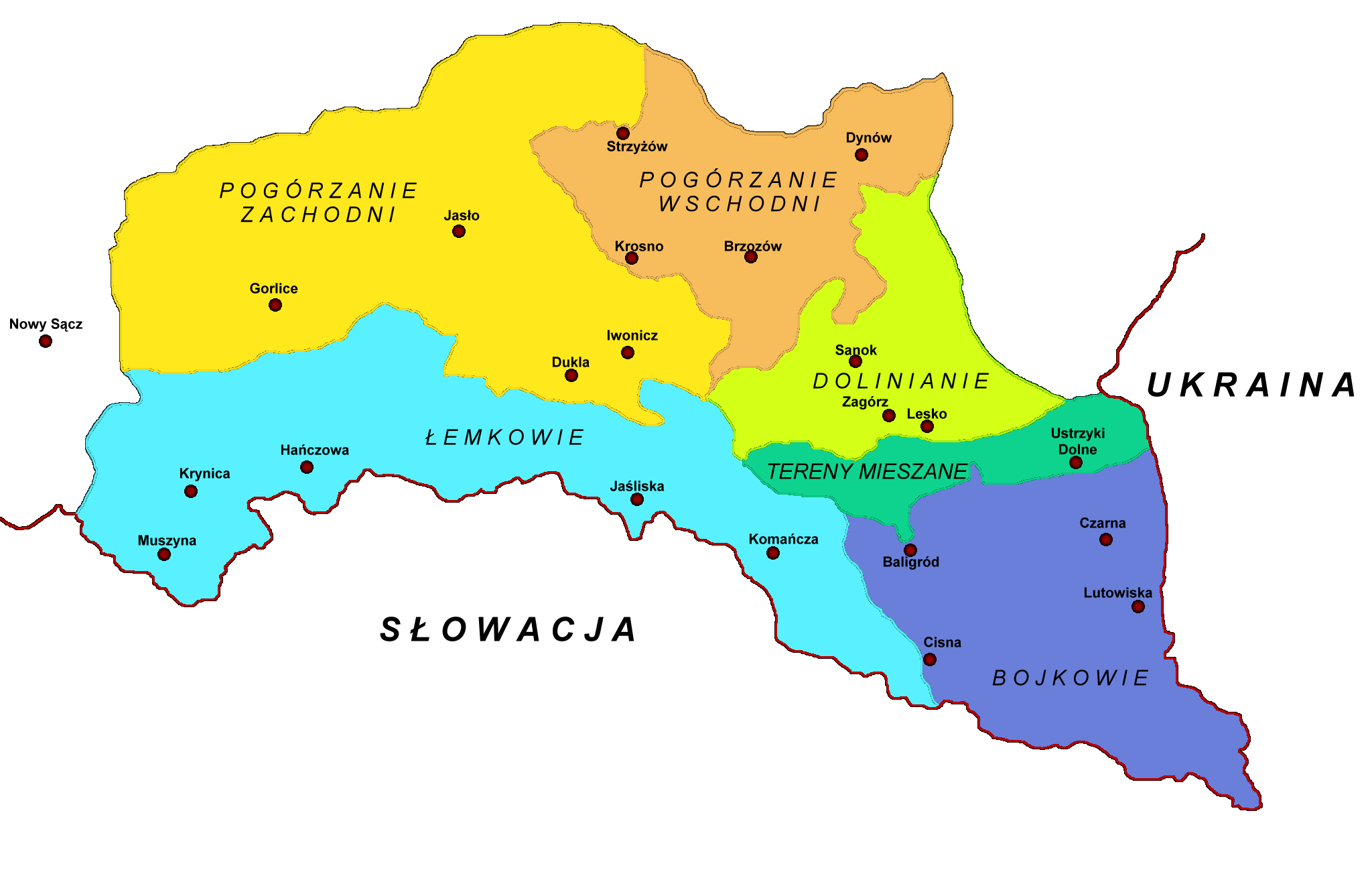
Highlander groups of southeastern Poland, Lemkos in cyan.

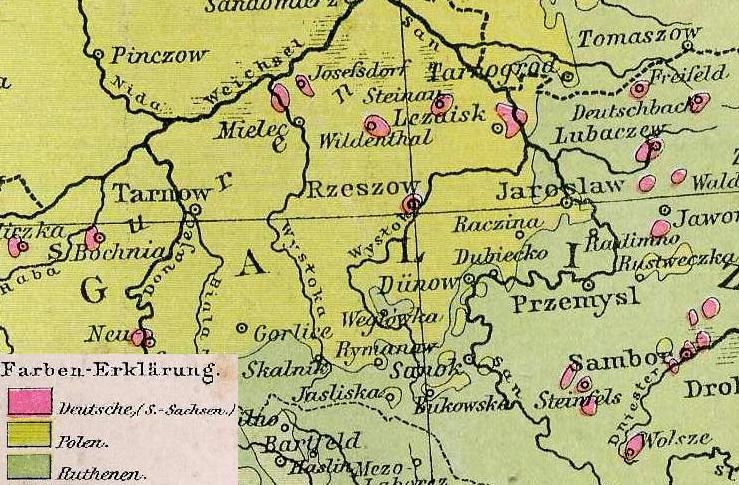
National map of languages (Outer Eastern Carpathians; Prešov Region; and Subcarpathian Voivodeship, 1876)

== History ==
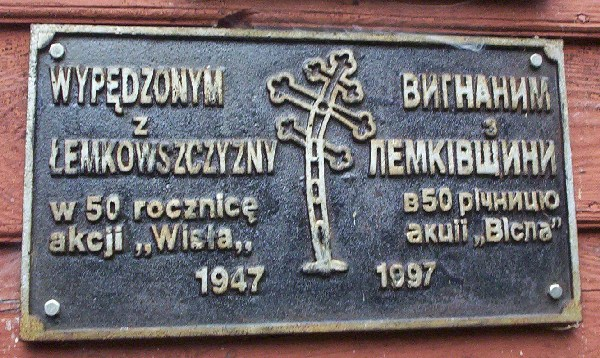
Tablet inscription in Polish (left) and Ukrainian: "In memory of those expelled from the Lemko Region, on the 50th anniversary of Operation Vistula, 1947–1997."

Several hypotheses account for the origin of the Lemkos, however, like all Rusyns, they most probably have a diverse ethnogenetic origin. The Lemkos (and other Carpatho-Rusyns) are considered to be descendants of the medieval White Croats, affected by the migration of Rusyn-influenced Slovaks, and the Vlach/Romanian migrations in the 14th and 15th centuries.

The Lemko Region became part of Poland in the time of the medieval Piast dynasty but was frequently disputed with the neighbouring Rus', as can be seen by taking the town of Sanok as an example: In 981CE Vladimir I of Kiev invaded the area and took it over from Poland.

In 1018 it returned to Poland, in 1031 it went back to Rus', and in 1340 Casimir III of Poland recovered it for Poland. The gord of Sanok is mentioned for the first time in Hypatian Codex in 1150. Lemkos (or their progenitors) became an ethnic minority as part of the Austrian province of Galicia in 1772. Mass emigration from this territory to the Western hemisphere for economic reasons began in the late 19th century.

Prior to World War I, Lemkos began to develop conflicting national identities. While some adopted the Ukrainian nationality, others favored the concept of the All-Russian nation (the so-called "Old Ruthenian" identity). As the Greek Catholic Church was keen on promoting the Ukrainian identity, some of the pro-Russian Lemkos began converting to the Orthodoxy. One of the most notable Orthodoxy converts was Saint Maxim Sandovich, a Lemko peasant who, after a brief experience as a Greek Catholic monk, converted to Orthodoxy, became a priest and began spreading Orthodoxy in the region.

The Austro-Hungarian Empire was highly suspicious of the pro-Russian Lemkos, as well of Sandovich himself. This led to a series of imprisonments before the breakout of World War I, including one of Sandovich himself. After the war broke out, Sandovich was imprisoned again, and executed without trial. In 1914, the Austro-Hungarian authorities created the Thalerhof internment camp, where they imprisoned Lemkos suspected of spying for the Russian Empire. During the war, 1767 people died in the Thalerhof camp.

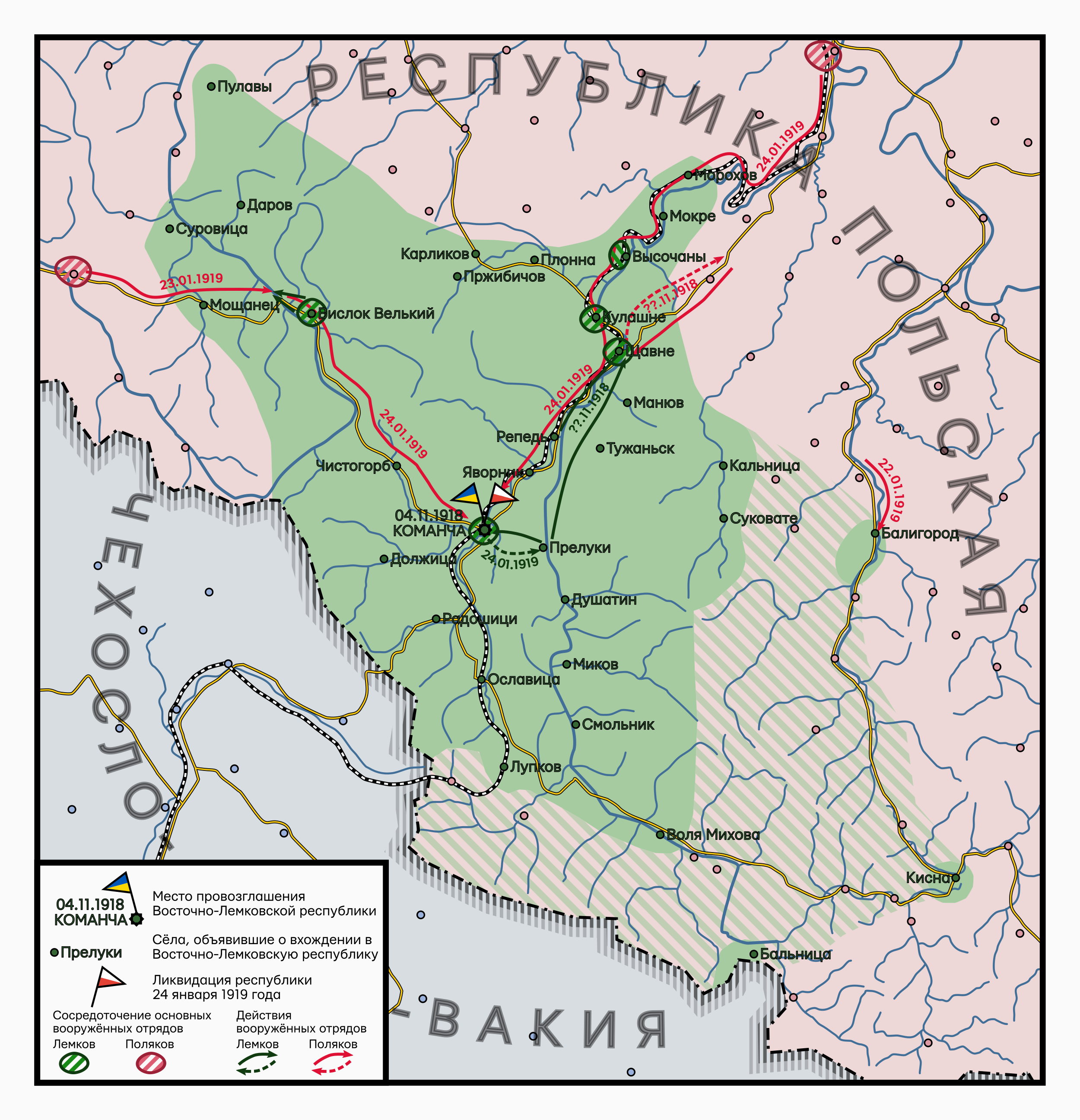
Komancza Republic in November of 1918

In the immediate aftermath World War I, Lemkos founded two short-lived republics, the Lemko-Rusyn Republic in the west of Galicia, which had a russophile orientation, as well as attempted to merge with Czechoslovakia and the Komancza Republic, with a Ukrainophilic orientation, which attempted to merge with West Ukrainian People's Republic.

During the time of the Second Polish Republic, the identity conflict between the Lemkos intensified. In 1926, following a conflict with their local Greek Catholic priest, the Lemko people of the village Tylawa underwent a massive conversion to Orthodoxy. This event, known as the Tylawa schism began a wave of mass conversions in the region, during which many villages completely converted to Orthodoxy, while some remained either loyal to Eastern Catholicism or divided between the two religions. As the Catholic Church was unwilling to hand over their temples to the Orthodox Church, in many convertite villages new churches had to be built.

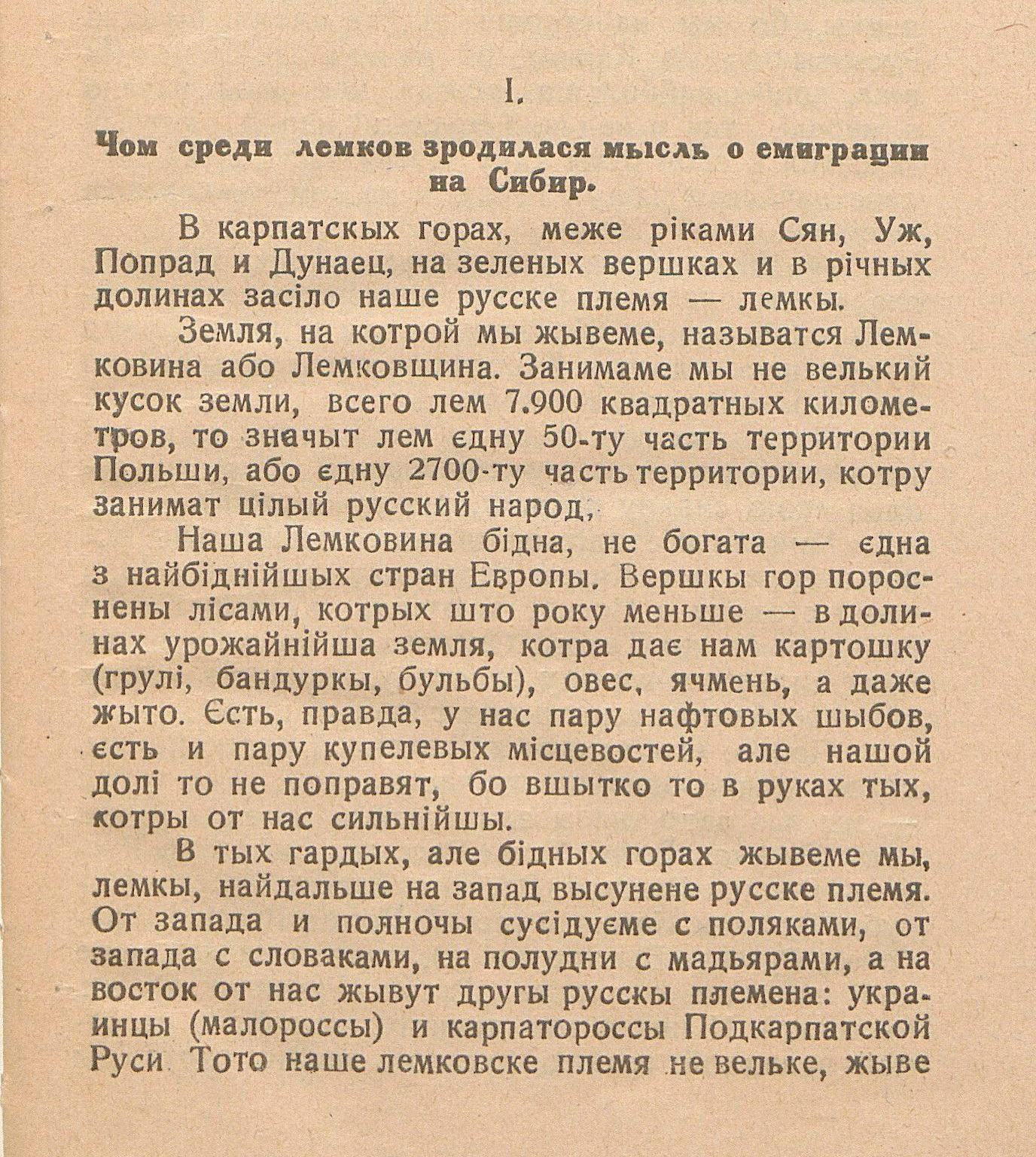
The first chapter of "Lemkovina Sybir" book by Sergej Ivanovič Hrizostomovič Durkot (1934) - distinguishes Lemkos from Poles, Slovaks, Madyars (Hungarians) and other "Rus tribes" - Ukrainians, and Carpathian Ruthenians.

It is estimated that about 130,000 to 140,000 Lemkos were living in the Polish part of the Lemko Region in 1939. Depopulation of these lands occurred during the forced resettlement, initially to the Soviet Union (about 90,000 people) and later to Poland's newly acquired western lands (about 35,000) in the Operation Vistula campaign of the late 1940s. This action was a state ordered removal of the civilian population, in a counter-insurgency operation to remove potential support for guerrilla war being waged by the Ukrainian Insurgent Army (UPA) in south-eastern Poland.

Some 5,000 Lemko families returned to their home regions in Poland between 1957 and 1958, (they were officially granted the right to return in 1956), the Lemko population in the Polish section of Lemkivschyna only numbers around 10,000–15,000 today. Some 50,000 Lemkos live in the western and northern parts of Poland, where they were sent to populate former German villages in areas ceded to Poland. Among those, 5,863 people identified themselves as Lemko in the 2002 census. However, 60,000 ethnic Lemkos may reside in Poland today. Within the Lemko Region, Lemkos live in the villages of Łosie, Krynica-Zdrój, Nowica, Zdynia, Gładyszów, Hańczowa, Zyndranowa, Uście Gorlickie, Bartne, Binczarowa and Bielanka. Additional populations can be found in Mokre, Szczawne, Kulaszne, Rzepedź, Turzańsk, Komańcza, Sanok, Nowy Sącz, and Gorlice.

In 1968 an open-air museum dedicated to Lemko culture was opened in Zyndranowa. Additionally, a Lemko festival is held annually in Zdynia.

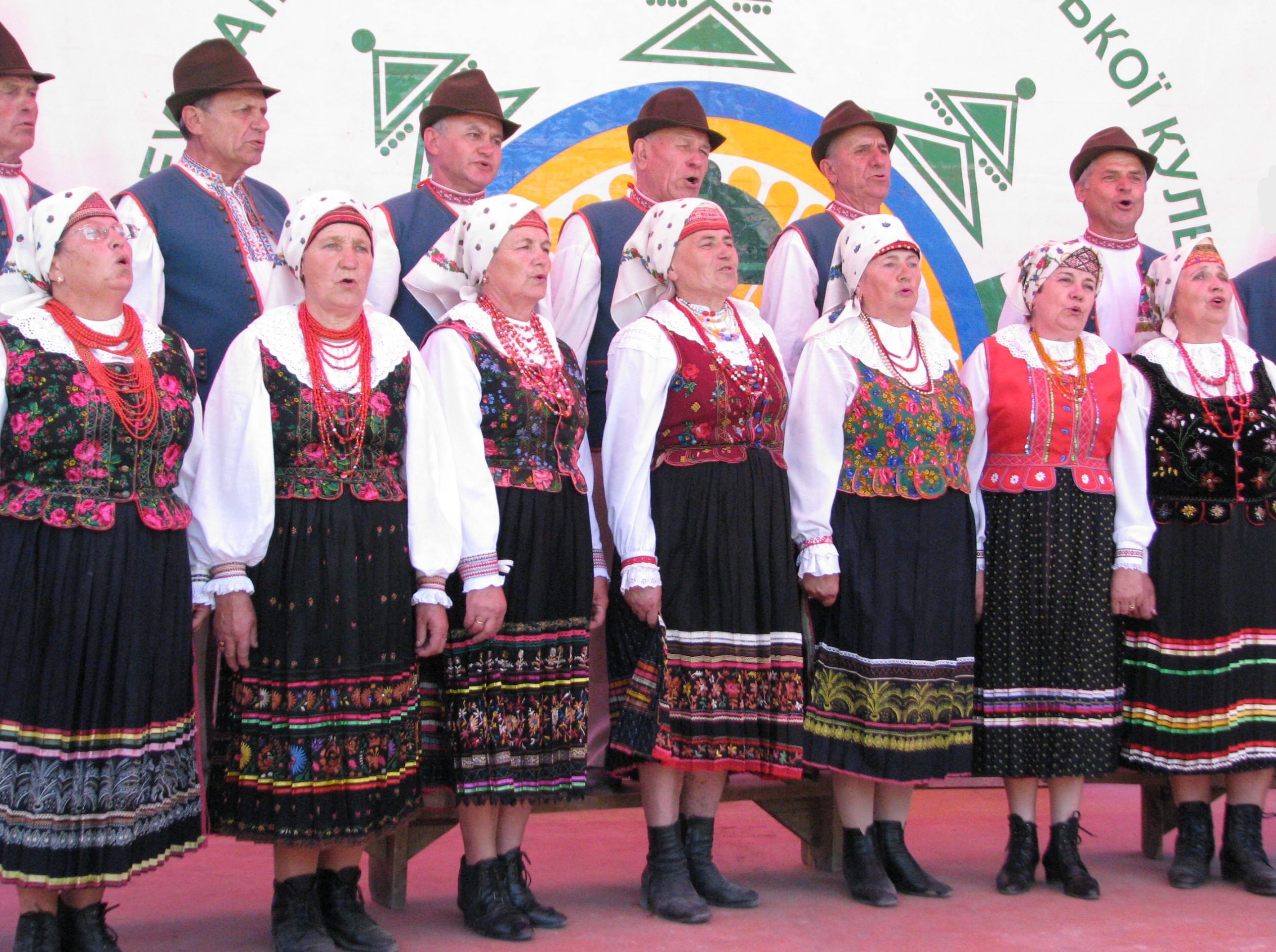
Lemko folklore ensemble "Studenka" from Kalush performing in August 2009 at the annual festival of Lemko culture in Monastyryska, Ternopil region (Ukraine).

In Ukraine several public initiatives have been founded in order to support and popularize Lemko culture and history, among them the all-Ukrainian Lemkivshchyna society, created in 2001, and the Moloda Lemkivshchyna ("Young Lemkivshchyna") youth organization established in 2008 in Lviv. Lemko festivals have been organized in Zymna Voda, Volia Yakubova near Drohobych, near Monastyryska and in Nahirne near Sambir. Lemko youth activists in Ukraine organize summer camps and popularize notable personalities of Lemko origin. In 1996 an ethnographic museum of Lemko culture "Lemko Village" was founded in Monastyryska, Ternopil region.

Festivals of Lemko culture also take place in Svidník, Slovakia, and in Bentinck Township, Ontario.

== Persecution ==
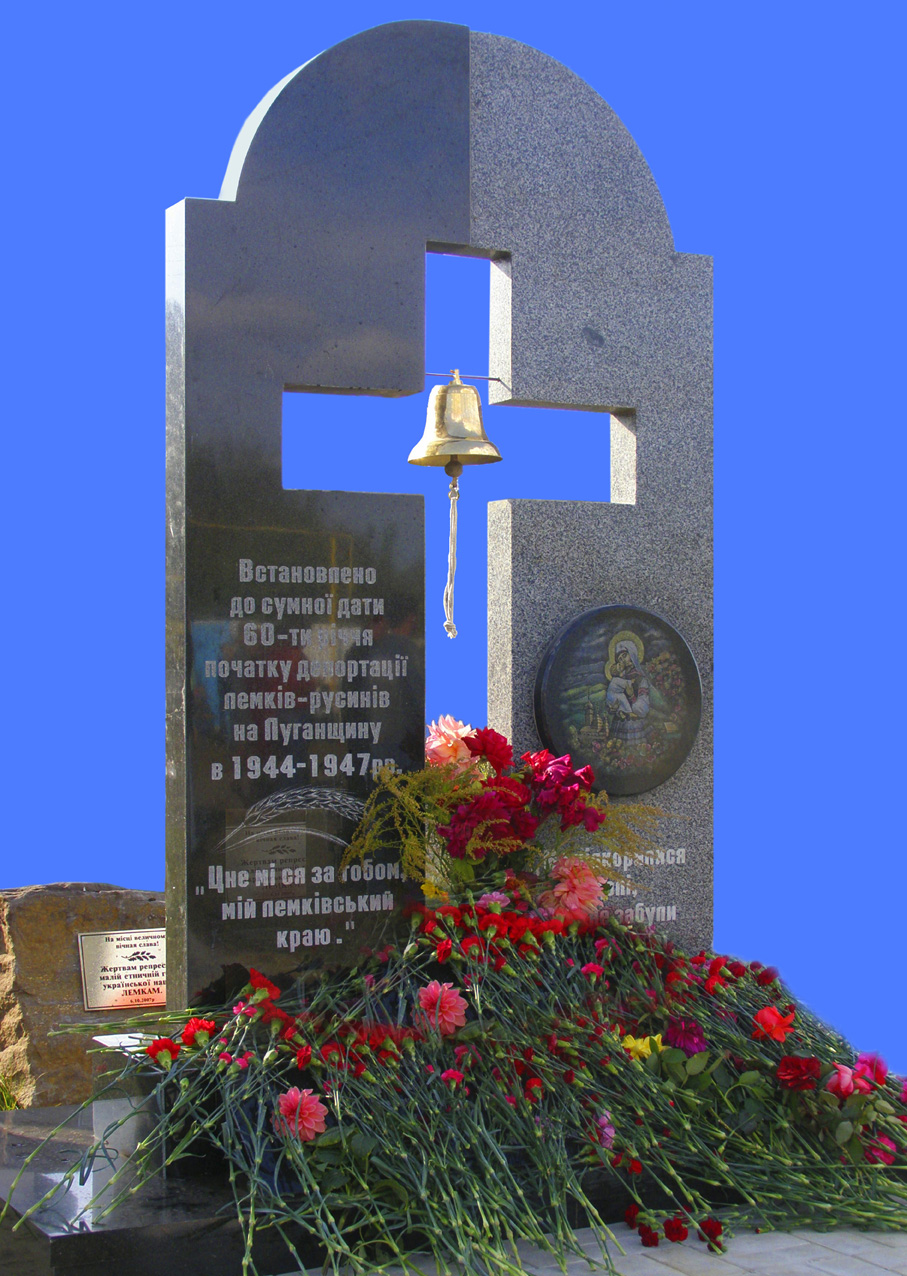
Monument commemorating the deportation of Lemkos. Peremozhne, Luhansk region (Ukraine)

The Lemkos have faced severe persecution in the 20th century, including mass deportations. A major example was Operation Vistula in 1947, when Poland’s communist regime, with Moscow’s tacit backing, forcibly resettled the Lemko people from their ancestral homes in the Carpathian region. Approximately 30,000 Lemkos were brutally deported in 1947 as part of Operation "Wisła" (Vistula), an effort to remove Ukrainian and Lemko populations from southeastern Poland and suppress the Ukrainian insurgency. This ethnic cleansing scattered Lemkos to distant areas (many were sent to Poland’s western territories), destroying their communities. Earlier, under a 1945 Polish-Soviet agreement, most Lemkos had already been compelled to leave for Soviet Ukraine, and by mid-1946 around 70–80% of Lemko families were uprooted from Poland. Those remaining were then caught in Operation Vistula’s dragnet the following year.

During the Russo-Ukrainian War, the Lemko-populated villages of Peremozhne, Luhansk Oblast, Zvanivka in Donetsk Oblast were occupied by Russian troops, leading to deaths of some of their inhabitants and destroying objects of Lemko cultural heritage.

== Religion ==
An important aspect of Lemko culture is their deep commitment to Byzantine Christianity which was introduced to the Eastern Slavs from Byzantium via Moravia through the efforts of Saints Cyril and Methodius in the 9th century. Originally the Lemkos adhered to Orthodoxy, but in order to avoid latinization, directly entered into Union of Brest with the Roman Catholic Church in the 17th century.

Most Lemkos today are Eastern rite or Byzantine-rite Catholics. In Poland they belong to the Ukrainian Greek Catholic Church with a Roman Catholic minority, or to the Ruthenian Catholic Church (see also Slovak Greek Catholic Church) in Slovakia. A substantial number belong to the Eastern Orthodox Church. Through the efforts of the martyred priest Father Maxim Sandovich (canonized by the Polish Orthodox Church in the 1990s), in the early 20th century, Eastern Orthodoxy was reintroduced to many Lemko areas which had accepted the Union of Brest centuries before.

The distinctive wooden architectural style of the Lemko churches is to place the highest cupola of the church building at the entrance to the church, with the roof sloping downward toward the sanctuary as opposed to their neighbouring sub-ethnic groups such as the Boykos who place the highest cupola in the middle. Both groups styles have three cupola with numerous eaves.

== Language/dialect ==
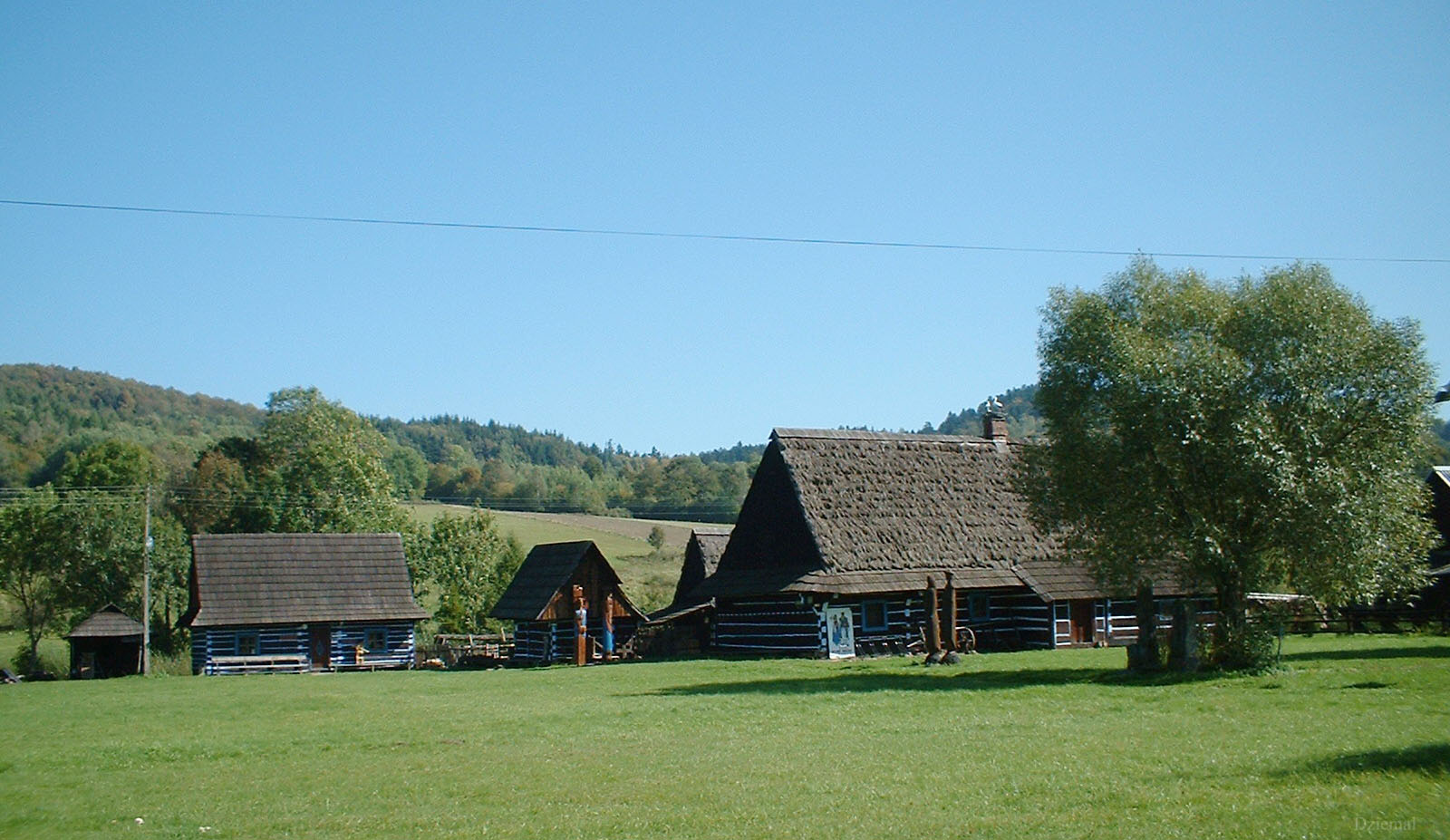
Lemko open-air museum in Zyndranowa

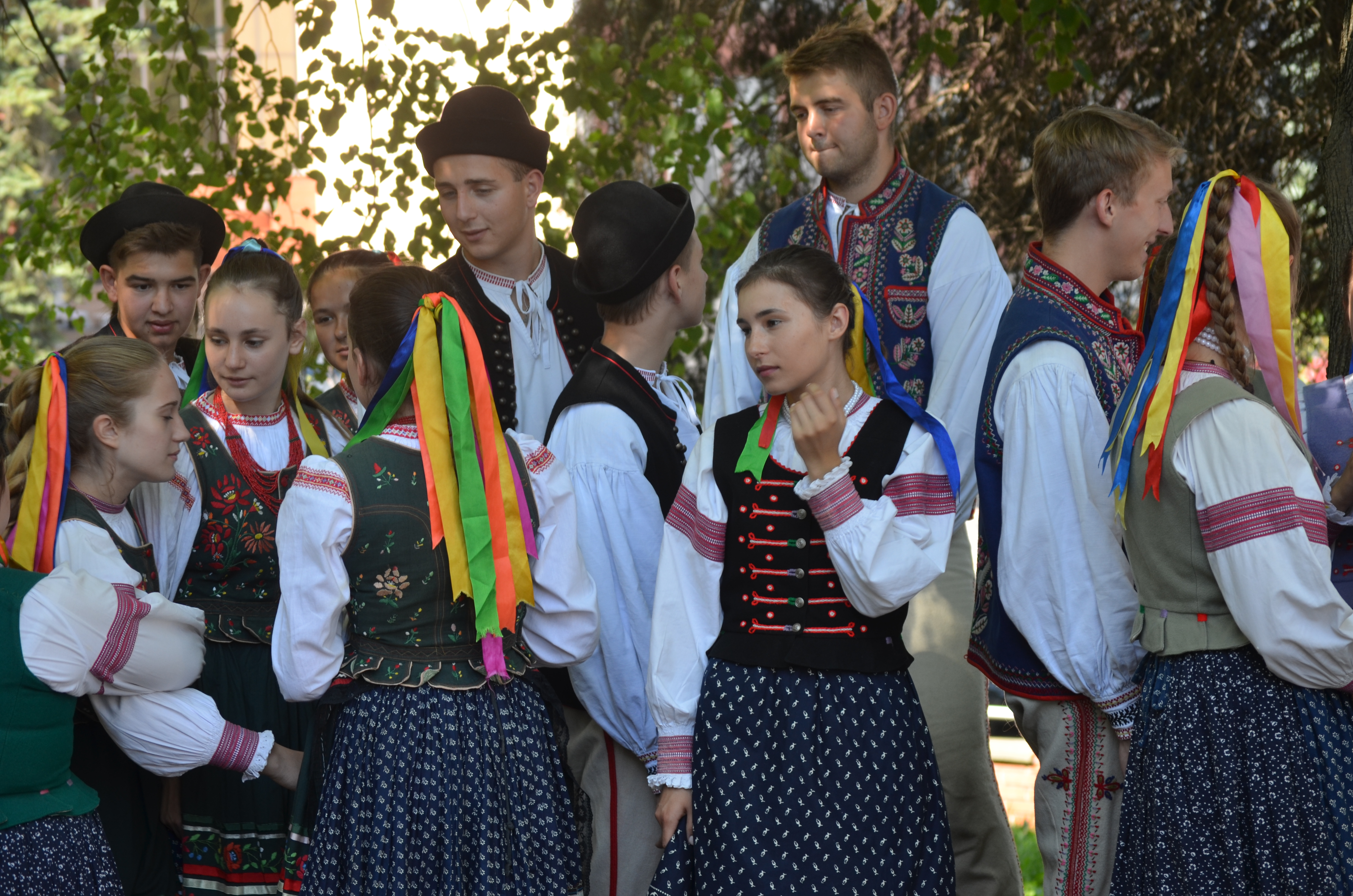
Lemkos in southeastern Poland

Part of Lemko folk costume

The Slavic dialects of Central Europe form (or formed, prior to standardization) a dialect continuum with few distinct boundaries between neighbouring varieties. However the question of language boundaries has become a controversial political issue since the dissolution of the Austro-Hungarian Empire and later the Soviet Union into "nation states", each having only one official language. The Lemko dialects share many features with other Carpathian ones, which are often grouped together as the Rusyn language by outside linguists.

The Lemko dialect has been influenced greatly by the languages spoken by geographically neighboring peoples and ruling elites, so much so that some consider it a separate entity.—Lemko speech includes some patterns matching those of the surrounding Polish and Slovak languages.

Metodyj Trochanovskij developed a Lemko Primer (Bukvar: Perša knyžečka dlja narodnŷch škol, 1935) and a First Reader (Druha knyžečka dlja narodnŷch škol, 1936) for use in schools in the Lemko-speaking area of Poland. In 1934, Lemko was introduced as the language of instruction in schools in the Lemko region. The pupils were taught from textbooks prepared by Trochanovskij and published by the State Publishing House. However, shortly before the outbreak of World War II Polish authorities replaced them with Ukrainian texts. Important fieldwork on the Lemko dialect was carried out by the Polish linguist Zdzisław Stieber before their dispersal.

According to the Central Statistical Office of Poland, in the school year 2010–2011, Lemko was taught as a first language in twenty primary schools and interschool groups, and ten schools and interschool groups at junior high level, with 188 students attending classes.

In the late 20th century, some Lemkos/Rusyns, mainly emigres from the region of the southern slopes of the Carpathians in modern-day Slovakia, began codifying a standard grammar for the Lemko dialect, which was presented on the 27 January 1995 in Prešov, Slovakia. In 2013 the famous novel The Little Prince was translated into Lemko by Petro Krynyckij.

== Lemkos in fiction ==
Nikolai Gogol's short story The Terrible Vengeance ends at Kriváň, now in Slovakia and pictured on the Slovak euro, in the heart of the Lemko Region in the Prešov Region. Avram Davidson makes several references to the Lemko people in his stories. Anna Bibko, mother-in-law of the protagonist of All Shall Be Well; and All Shall Be Well; and All Manner of Things Shall Be Well, is a Lemko "guided by her senses of traditionalism and grievance, not necessarily in that order".

In the critically acclaimed movie The Deer Hunter the wedding reception scene was filmed in Lemko Hall in the Tremont neighborhood of Cleveland, Ohio, which had a significant immigrant population of Lemkos at one time. The three main characters’ surnames, however, appear to be Russian, possibly Polish and Ukrainian (Michael "Mike" Vronsky, from Polish Wroński, Steven Pushkov, and Nikonar "Nick" Chevotarevich) and the wedding was filmed inside St. Theodosius Russian Orthodox Cathedral, which is also located in Tremont.

== Notable Lemkos ==
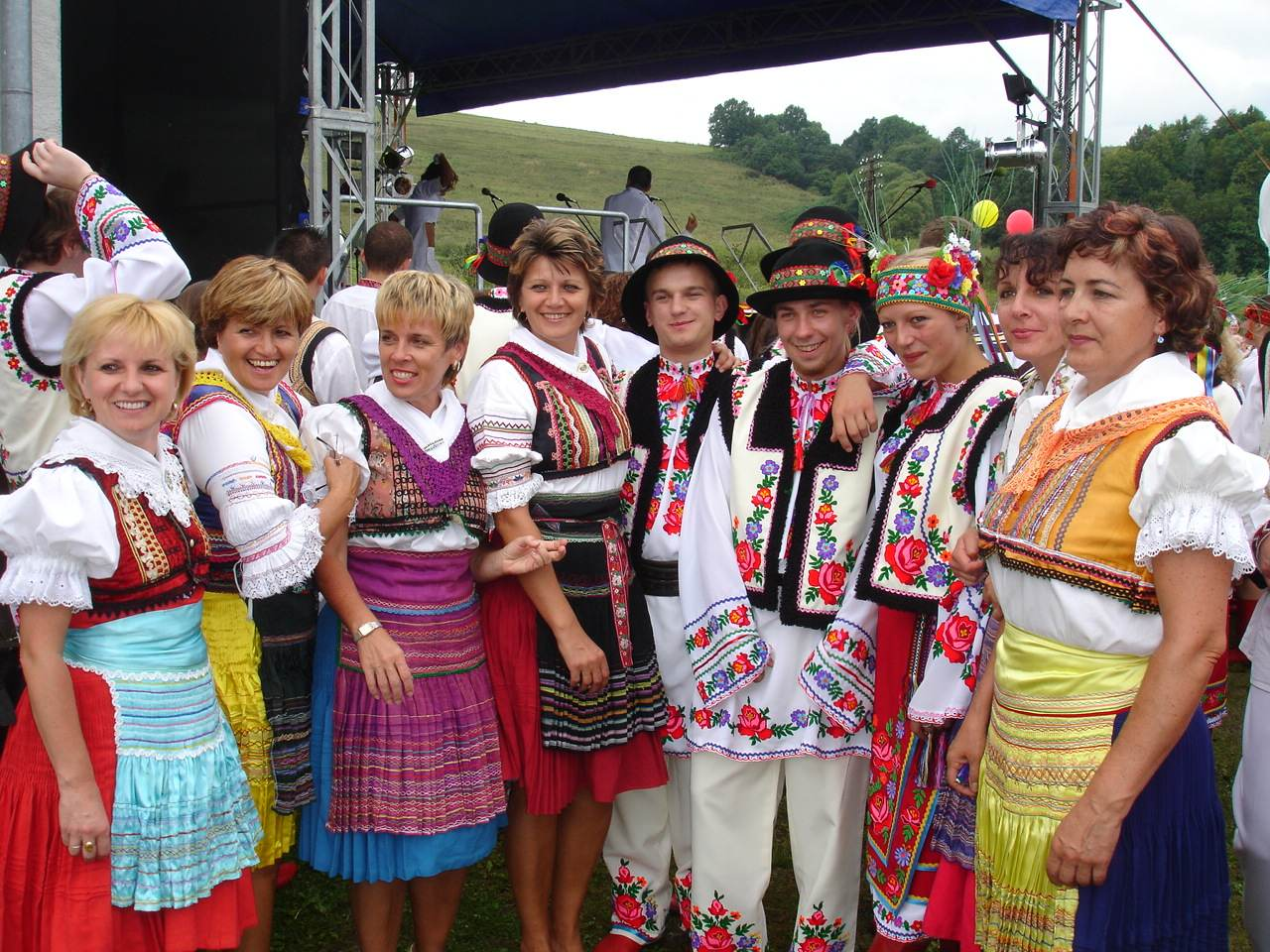
Prešov area Lemkos (left side) and Przemyśl area Ukrainians in traditional attire. Photo: Village Mokre near Sanok. 2007

- Anytchka, singer
- Bohdan Ihor Antonych, poet
- Mary Beck, Detroit politician
- Thomas Bell, American novelist
- Dmitry Bortniansky, Russian-Ukrainian composer
- Emil Czyrniański, chemist
- Steve Ditko, comic book artist, co-creator of Spider-Man
- Aleksander Dukhnovych, writer
- Bill Evans, American jazz pianist and composer
- Sofia Fedyna, Ukrainian singer and politician
- Misia Furtak, musician
- Teodor Gocz, Lemko activist, creator of the Lemko Culture Museum in Zyndranowa
- Igor Herbut, musician
- Kiril Petruchuk, Polish actor
- Andrew Kay, inventor of the digital voltmeter (1953), and inductee of the Computer Hall of Fame for founding Kaypro Computer
- Ivan Krasovs'kyi, Lemko ethnographer/historian
- Volodymyr Kubiyovych, Ukrainian geographer
- Seman Madzelan, Lemko writer and activist
- Adrian Mikhalchishin, Ukrainian chessmaster
- Yuriy Mikhalchishin, Ukrainian politician, member of Ukrainian party Svoboda, son of Adrian Mikhalchishin
- Nikifor, painter
- Radoslav Rochallyi, writer
- Maxim Sandovich, Orthodox saint
- Andrij Savka aka Andrew Sawka, bandit, folk hero, Lemko "Robin Hood", led peasant revolution in 1651
- Michael Smerconish, American radio host, television host, and author
- Khrystyna Soloviy, Ukrainian folk singer
- George Stroumboulopoulos, Canadian television personality with Ukrainian-born mother
- Petro Murianka (Piotr Trochanowski), Lemko poet, involved with contemporary Lemko issues
- Metodyj Trochanovskij, Lemko grammarian
- Andy Warhol (birth name Warhola), American artist, major figure in the pop art movement
- James Warhola, American artist
- John Warhola, American artist
- Julia Warhola, American artist
- Nick Holonyak, American electrical engineer and inventor of first light-visible LED

== See also ==
- Besida
- Boyko
- Carpathian Ruthenia
- Green Ukraine republic
- History of Ukraine
- Hutsuls
- Lemko Republic
- Muzeum Budownictwa Ludowego w Sanoku
- Red Ruthenia
- Rusyn American
- Rusyn language
- Rusyns
- Ruthenia
- Ruthenians
- Shlakhtov Ruthenians
- Siberian Republic
- Ukraine
- Ukrainians
- White Croatia
