= Besida =

Бесіда
- Discipline: Lemko studies and literature
- Language: Rusyn, Polish
- Edited by: Petro Trochanowski

Publication details
- History: 1989–present
- Publisher: Zarząd Główny Stowarzyszenia Łemków (Lemko Association) (Poland)
- Frequency: Quarterly

Standard abbreviations
- ISO 4: Besida

Indexing
- ISSN: 1508-5104
- OCLC no.: 42520680

Besida (Rusyn: Бесіда) is a journal edited by Petro Trochanowski in Krynica, Poland. It is known as a source of information about the Lemko people.
