= Lemko Region =

Ethnographic region in Europe traditionally inhabited by the Lemkos

Coordinates: 49°34′00″N 20°59′00″E

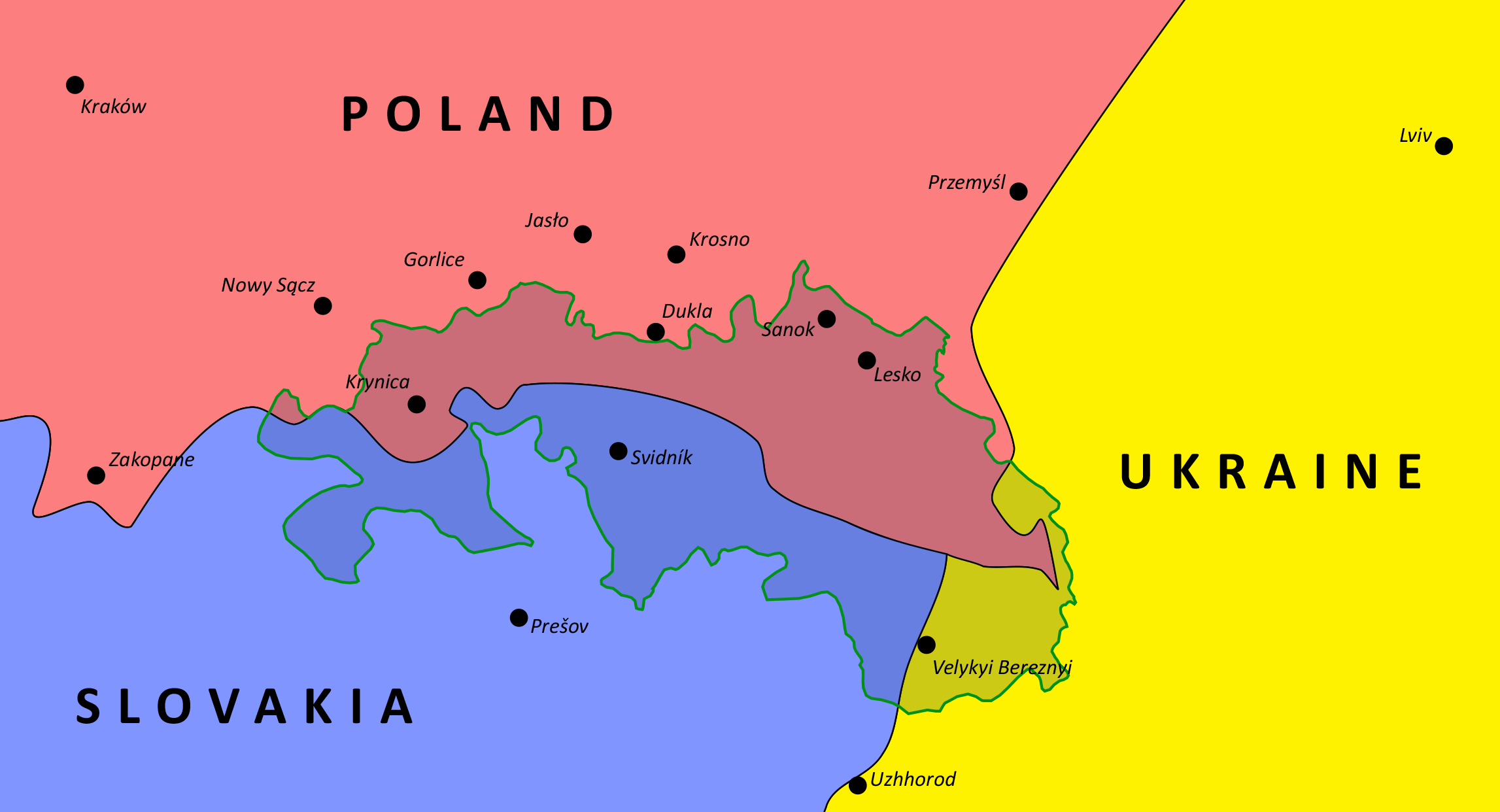
Map of Lemkovyna according to World federation of Ukrainian Lemko organizations

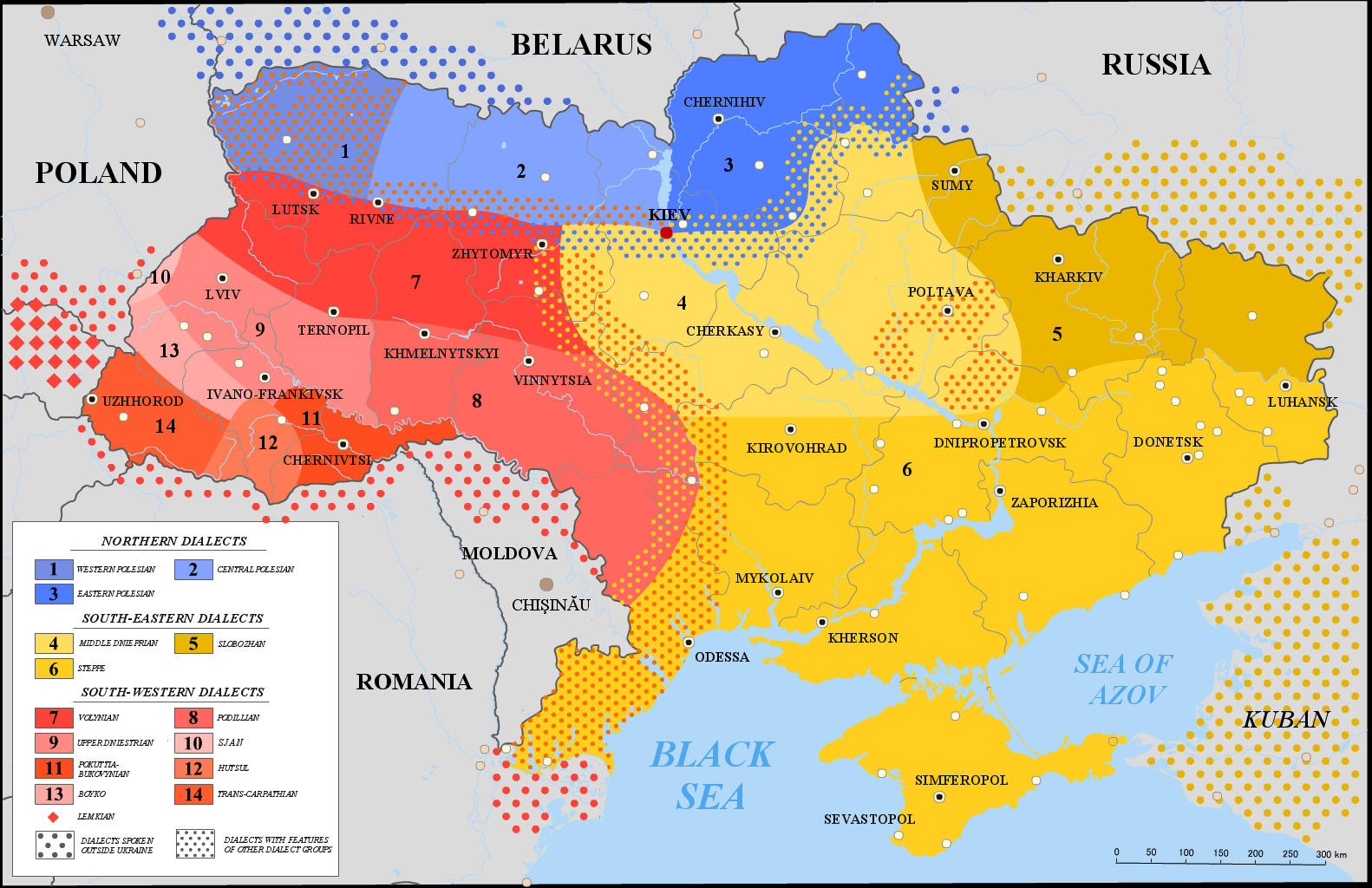
The Lemko dialect is sometimes considered a variety of the Ukrainian language, the Rusyn language, or separate from both. On the above map of Ukrainian dialects part of the region where Lemko was spoken is westernmost area in grey dotted with red diamonds, but the actual area extends far to the west and also to the south across the border with Slovakia.

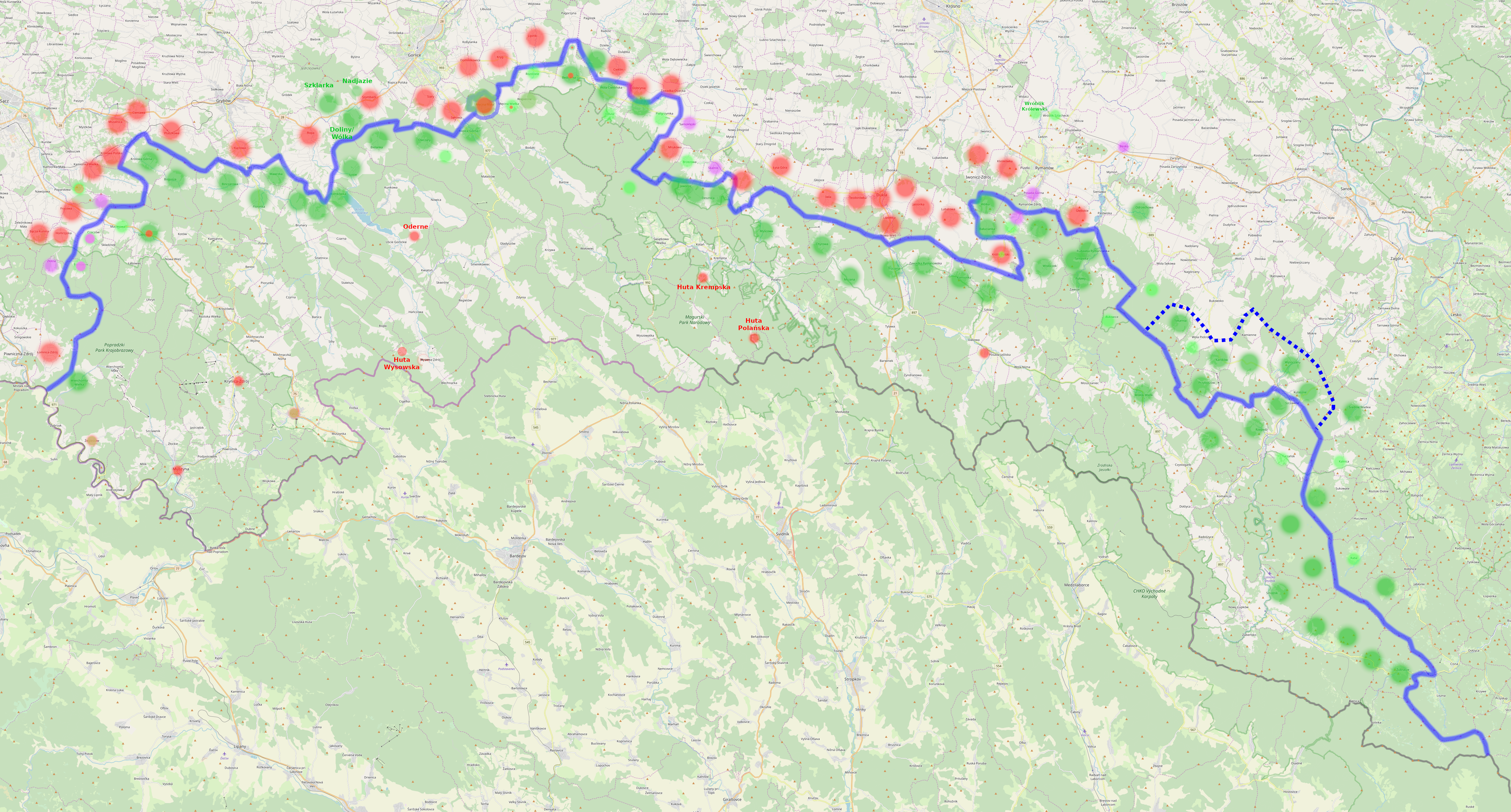
Northern border of the Lemko Region in Poland according to Roman Reinfuss Polish settlement Lemko settlement

The Lemko Region (Rusyn: Лемковина, romanized: Lemkovyna; Polish: Łemkowszczyzna; Ukrainian: Лемківщина, romanized: Lemkivshchyna) is an ethnographic area in southern Poland and Northern Eastern Slovakia that has traditionally been inhabited by the Lemko people. The land stretches approximately 140 km (87 mi) long and 25–50 km (16–31 mi) wide along the north side of the Carpathian Mountains, following the Polish-Slovak border from the Poprad River. In the East, the region is described as either terminating linguistically between the Wisłok and Osława Rivers, or ethnographically at the Sanok River (depending on the author), where it meets the Boyko region. Some even go so far as to consider it to extend south into the Prešov Region, Slovakia.

Previously a frontier area under the nominal control of Great Moravia, the Lemko Region became part of Poland in medieval Piast times. It was made part of the Austrian province of Galicia due to the First Partition of Poland in 1772. Parts were briefly independent under the Lemko-Rusyn Republic and Komancza Republic, and later annexed to Poland.

Most Lemkos in Poland were deported from their ancestral region as part of Operation Vistula in 1946, and only a small part of them remains there today, the rest being scattered across the Recovered Territories.

The landscape is typical of medium-height-mountain terrain, with ridges reaching 1,000 m (3,300 ft) and sometimes 1,300 m (4,300 ft). Only small parts of the southern Low Beskids and the northern San river region have a low-mountain landscape. Even so, the region still occupies some of the lowest elevations in the Carpathians: most of the Low Beskids, the western part of the Middle Beskids, and the eastern fringe of the Western Beskids. Conversely, it also includes much of the higher elevations of the Carpathians within modern-day Poland, which extend approximately to the Poprad River in the west (see: Ruś Szlachtowska). A series of mountain passes along the Torysa River and Poprad River (Tylych Pass 688 m (2,257 ft); Dukla Pass, 502 m (1,647 ft); and Łupków Pass, 657 m (2,156 ft)) facilitate communication between Galician and Transcarpathian Lemkos.

== See also ==
- Muzeum Budownictwa Ludowego w Sanoku
- Lemko-Rusyn Republic
- Komancza Republic
- Operation Vistula
