= Bohdan Ihor Antonych =

Ukrainian poet

Bohdan Ihor Antonych Богдан-Ігор Антонич
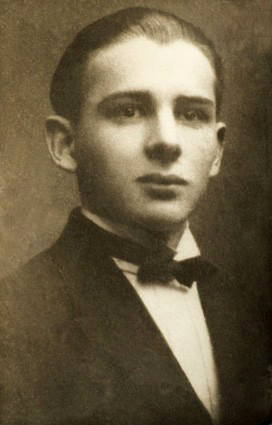
- Antonych in the 1930s
- Born: October 5, 1909; Nowica, Galicia, Austria-Hungary
- Died: 6 July 1937 (aged 27); Lviv, Poland
- Citizenship: Austria-Hungary; West Ukrainian People's Republic; Ukrainian People's Republic; Poland
- Education: Lviv University
- Occupations: Poet, writer, translator, literary critic
- Parent: Vasyl Antonych (father)
- Writing career
- Period: 1931–1937

Bohdan-Ihor Vasyliovych Antonych (Ukrainian: Богдан-Ігор Васильович Антонич; 5 October 1909 – 6 July 1937) was a 20th-century Ukrainian poet. In 1934, Antonych received a prize from the Ivan Franko Society of Writers and Journalists for his work Three Signet Rings.

== Biography ==
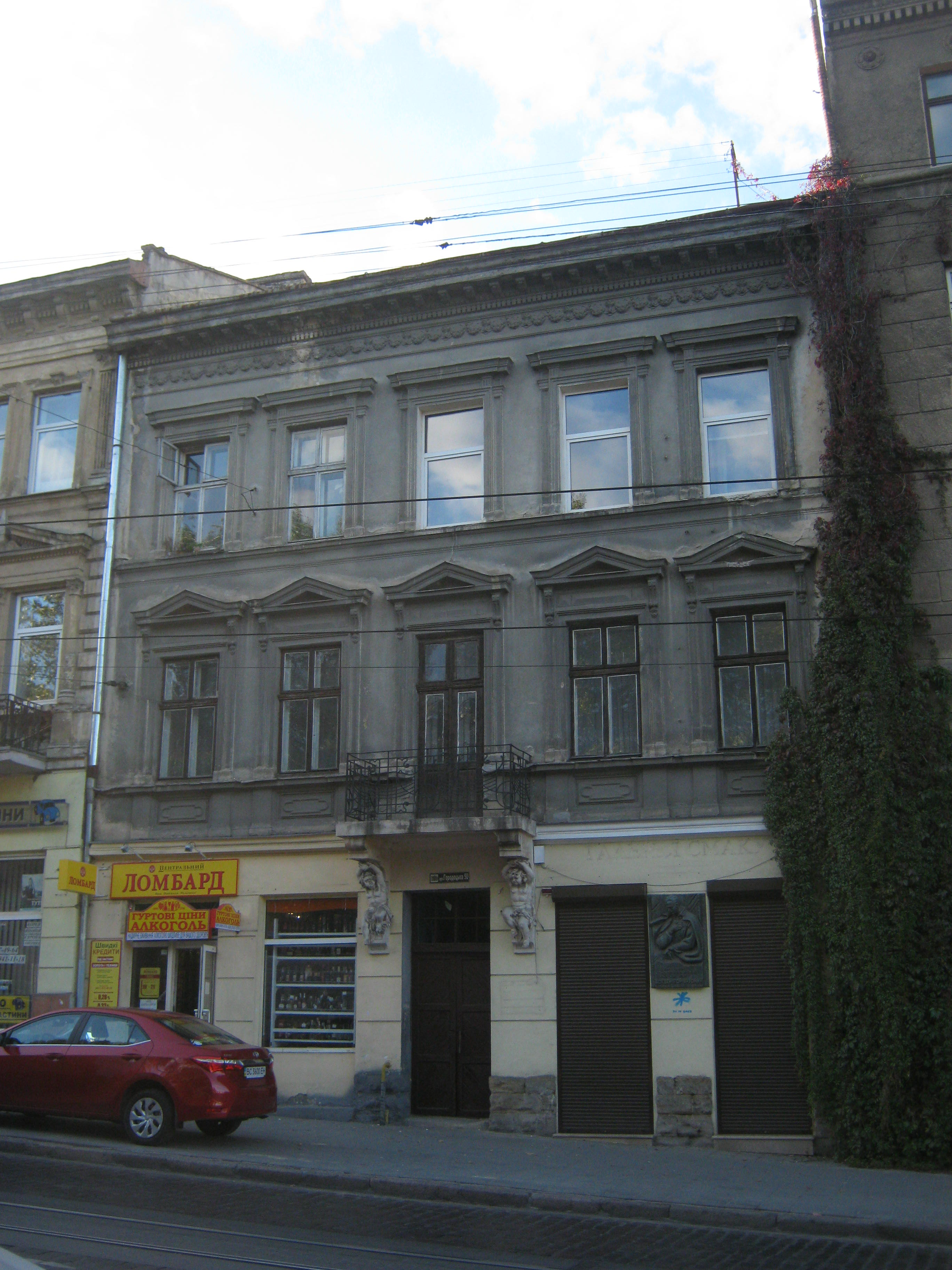
The house where Antonych lived in 1928-1937

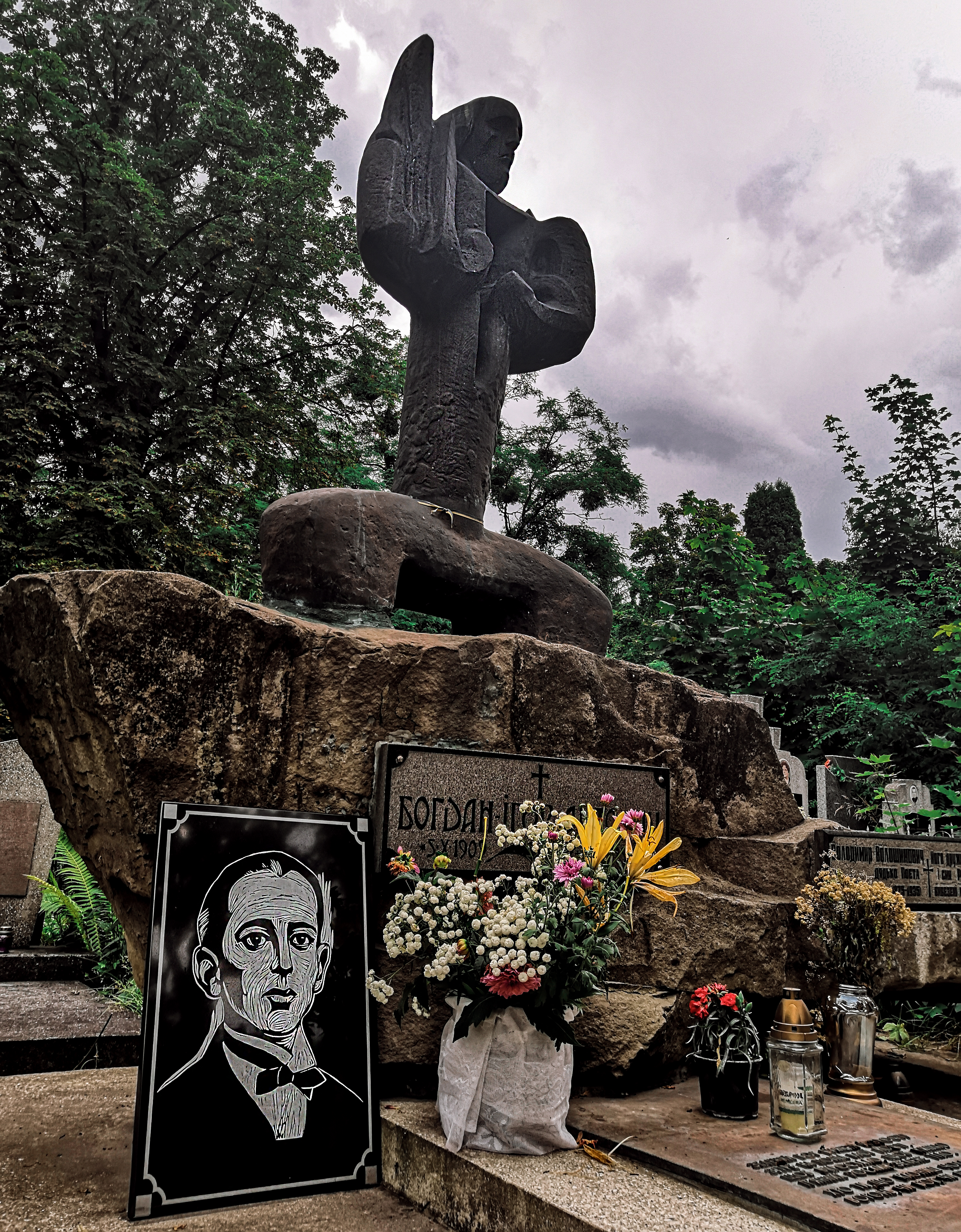
Grave of Bohdan Ihor Antonych at the Yaniv Cemetery in Lviv

Antonych was born and raised in the Lemko village of Nowica where his father, Vasyl, was a parish priest. In 1928, Antonych left Nowica to study at Lviv University, where he remained until he received his degree in Slavic studies in 1933. From 1928 to 1933, Antonych was a student at the Jan Kazimierz University in Lviv, where he studied at the Faculty of Philosophy (specializing in Polish philology). In order to help finance his chosen career of professional writer, he occasionally worked as an editor for journals such as Dazhboh and Karby.

Antonych died from pneumonia on 6 July 1937.

== Style ==
In his poetry, Antonych combined the principles of imagism with a life-affirming paganism inspired by Lemko folklore. He declared himself "a pagan in love with life" and "a poet of spring intoxication".

== Legacy ==
In October 2009, the National Bank of Ukraine issued a commemorative coin in Antonych's honor as a part of its "Outstanding Personalities of Ukraine" series.

== Selected works ==
- Autobiography (Автобіографія)
- The Green Gospel (Зелена Євангелія). Lviv, 1938
- Book of the Lion (Книга Лева). Lviv, 1936;
- На другому березі (unfinished)
- Welcome to Life [Привітання життя]. Lviv, 1931;
- Song on the Indestructibility of Matter (Пісня про незнищенність матерії)
- Rotations (Ротації). Lviv, 1938.
- Three Rings (Три перстені). Lviv, 1934;
- Ukrainian translations of Rainer Maria Rilke's works
