= Stefan Mossor =

Polish general

- Born: 23 October 1896; Kraków, Austria-Hungary
- Died: 22 September 1957 (aged 60); Warsaw, Polish People's Republic
- Burial place: Powązki Military Cemetery, Warsaw
- Military career
- Allegiance: Austria-Hungary; Second Republic of Poland; Polish People's Republic
- Branch: Austro-Hungarian Army; Polish Legions; Polish Armed Forces; Polish People's Army
- Service years: 1914-1957
- Rank: Generał dywizji (Major general)
- Units: 6th Mounted Rifle Regiment; Polish General Staff; Operational Group "Vistula"
- Commands: deputy regiment commander cavalry regiment commander deputy chief of the General Staff operational group commander
- Conflicts: First World War; Polish-Soviet War; Second World War; Fighting against anti-communist guerrillas Operation Vistula
- Awards

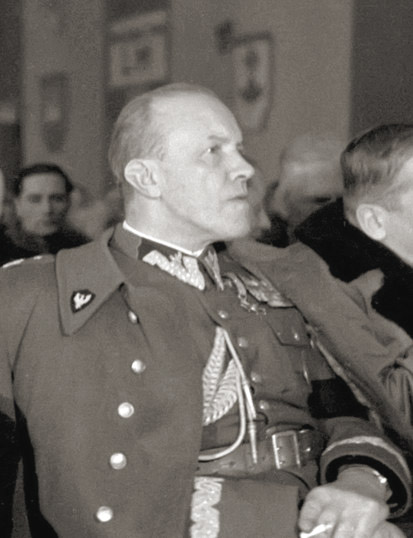
Stefan Mossor

Stefan Adolf Mossor (23 October 1896, Kraków - 22 September 1957) was a Polish general. He was a member of the Polish Legions. From 1928 to 1930, he studied at École Supérieure de Guerre in Paris. In the Second Polish Republic he reached the rank of the lieutenant colonel. He was taken prisoner by the Germans during the invasion of Poland.

== Biography ==
=== Youth ===
His parents were Kazimierz and Józefa Konstancja Kretschmer. He had two brothers, Stanisław and Tadeusz. He was raised in a family with patriotic traditions. He began his secondary school education in one of the Lviv gymnasiums. In the years 1908-1914 he continued his education in Jarosław. He studied at the local Imperial-Royal I Gymnasium, finishing the 7th grade in 1914. Before the outbreak of the First World War, he was accepted to study at the Forestry Academy in Vienna.

=== First World War ===
After the outbreak of the First World War, he was sent to a reserve troop, which was later transformed into the 2nd Infantry Regiment. He was transported to Carpathian Ruthenia. On October 23, his unit fought its first skirmish with the Russian Army. On October 29, his unit fought in the Battle of Mołotków, during which Stefan Mossor was wounded. On November 4, he shot himself in the hand and was delegated to serve as a telephone operator, and was then sent to hospital. On December 4, 1914, he joined the cavalry. In July 1915, he served in the 2nd Squadron of the 2nd Uhlan Regiment. On June 13, 1915, the squadron led a charge near Rokitna. Then he went to Rarańcza. In October, he was transferred to Volhynia. During the first decade of November he served in the 3rd Regiment of the 2nd Brigade and took part in the battles of Lisów and Kostiuchnówka. During one of the patrols he was injured or wounded and at the beginning of December 1915 he was hospitalized. On 10 February 1916 he was transferred to the Polish Legions in Przemyśl. He was withdrawn to the frontline zone. On 10 October he arrived at Baranavichy. After the announcement of the Act of 5th November he made another journey to the Congress Poland. On 12 March 1917 he was delegated to the 6th Squadron of the 2nd Uhlan Regiment. After the oath crisis he remained in the ranks of the 2nd Uhlan Regiment. At the beginning of 1918 he was hospitalized. In February 1918 there was a mutiny, as a result of which Mossor was interned and sent to Italy by the Austrians. According to the documents, he found himself in the town of Moline, was incorporated into the 6th Uhlan Regiment and commanded a platoon. In March, he received leave to Jarosław. In August, he was sent to the cavalry officers' school in Stockerau. The following month, he returned to his hometown. During the fights with the Ukrainians, he enlisted in a newly formed squadron and also broke through the village of Potylicz, occupied by the Ukrainians.

=== The Interwar Period ===
After Poland regained independence, he served in the Polish Army. In January 1919, he was promoted to officer rank. He was assigned to a full-time position in the 11th Uhlan Regiment located in Mińsk Mazowiecki. He was then assigned to the Blue Army under the command of General Józef Haller. On July 7, he reported to the army headquarters and headquarters in Kraków. In June, he began forming the 5th Siberian Division. During the Polish-Soviet War, he commanded the 1st Squadron of the 4th Mounted Rifle Regiment.

In 1921, he began his studies at the Lviv Polytechnic. He was verified as a lieutenant and returned to the 6th Mounted Rifle Regiment in Hruszów. At the end of February, he applied for a transfer from the 6th Mounted Rifle Regiment to the 3rd Light Cavalry Regiment. On April 20 of the same year, he was assigned to a cavalry regiment. As a result of reorganization, Mossor ended up in Płock. On May 11, he became temporary deputy commander of the 2nd squadron. On January 17, 1922, he was transferred to the position of acting commander of the 3rd squadron. On August 3, 1922, he was promoted to captain. He was then delegated to the Central Cavalry School in Grudziądz.

In the years 1921–1927, he commanded a squadron in the 3rd Masovian Light Cavalry Regiment in Suwałki. In the years 1927–1928, he was a student of the Higher Military School in Warsaw. In 1928, after the first year of studies, he was sent to a two-year normal course at the École Supérieure de Guerre in Paris. After completing his studies and obtaining the academic title of a certified officer on November 1, 1930, he was assigned to the Higher Military Academy as a lecturer. In January 1934, he was transferred to the 10th Mounted Rifle Regiment in Łańcut as deputy commander of the regiment. On September 15, 1935, he returned to the Higher Military Academy.

In September 1937, Marshal Edward Śmigły-Rydz, at the request of Gen. Tadeusz Kutrzeba, assigned him to his staff as the first officer of the general's staff. From November 14, 1937 to January 10, 1938, under the direction of General Kutrzeba, he developed the Study of the Strategic Plan of the War Against Germany (the authorship is wrongly attributed to General Kutrzeba). On March 10, 1939, he was transferred from the staff position and took the position of commander of the 6th Mounted Rifle Regiment. On August 27 he was assigned to the Łódź Army.

=== Second World War ===
He took part in the defensive war in 1939 as a lieutenant colonel and a commander of the 6th Horse Rifle Regiment. On September 11, he was taken prisoner by the Germans. He was sent to Rawa Mazowiecka, and then to the camp in Zgorzelec (Stalag VIII A). For the first month until mid-October, he served as the senior of block A. Then he was sent to camp II A in Prenzlau. At the end of February 1941, he was transferred to Neubrandenburg.

During his stay in the Oflag in Neubrandenburg, on April 17, 1943, together with a group of Polish officers, he was brought by the Germans to Katyn, where mass graves of victims of the Katyn massacre were discovered. There, he was introduced to the mass graves of Polish officers previously imprisoned in the camp in Kozelsk. Than he prepared a report dated August 23, 1943, which he forwarded to the Commander-in-Chief. On June 11, he was transferred to Oflag 8 in Frauenberg near Lübben. On August 4, 1943, he was sent to Neubrandenburgand in January 1944, he was transferred to Oflag II D Gross-Born. To protect himself from accusations of collaboration with the Germans, he prepared and buried copies of the memoranda on the camp grounds. He was the last to leave the Gross-Born camp.

== After the War ==
In February 1945, he volunteered for service in the Polish People's Army. He held the position of deputy chief of staff of the 1st Polish Army, then deputy commander of the 12th Infantry Division. At the beginning of June 1945, he was promoted to colonel and transferred to Warsaw, where he became deputy chief of the 1st Department of the General Staff, and then chairman of the Polish Army Verification Commission. In September 1945, he became head of the cabinet of the Minister of National Defense and was promoted to the rank of brigadier general. In January 1946, he took the position of deputy chief of the General Staff. From 1947, he was a member of the Polish Workers' Party. In February 1947, he conducted inspections in the Voivodship Security Committees in Katowice, Kraków and Lublin, after which he proposed that the action of resettling the Ukrainians to the Western Lands should begin in the spring of 1947. Mossor was the commander of the Operational Group "Vistula", established for the purpose of resettling the Ukrainian population. When on 24 April 1947 the government presidium passed a resolution on the Operation Vistula, he received a nomination from the Minister of National Defence, Marshal Michał Rola-Żymierski, for the position of Government Plenipotentiary for the Operation of Resettlement of the Ukrainian Population and Combating the Ukrainian Insurgent Army. Although in Directive No. 7, Marshal Żymierski clearly instructed General Mossor that the main objective of the "Vistula" Operation was resettlement, and direct combat with the UIA was a secondary, side objective. As a result of this operation, the UIA lost about 70% of its personnel and its supply base in the Rzeszów region. In recognition of his services, on 22 July 1947 he was promoted to the rank of Major General and took over the position of commander of the 5th Military District in Kraków. At the end of 1949 he was transferred to the position of head of the Studies Office at the Ministry of National Defense.

On May 13, 1950 he was arrested on charges of an anti-state "army conspiracy". He was accused of acting to the detriment of the Polish state and nation during World War II by preparing memoranda in which he "outlined the project of a fascist Poland under the protectorate of Hitlerite Germany", and after 1945 he conducted espionage activities directed against the people's state. On August 13, 1951, in the so-called Trial of the Generals, the Supreme Military Court found him guilty of the charges and sentenced him to life imprisonment and degradation. In prison he was subjected to brutal torture, but the investigators failed to break him and force him to incriminate others, primarily General Wacław Komar and Marshal Żymierski. On December 10, 1955, the Council of State exercised the power of pardon and changed the life sentence to 15 years in prison. The Supreme Military Court granted Mossor a one-year break from serving his sentence and on 13 December 1955 he left prison. On 24 April 1956 his case was reopened, his proceedings were soon dismissed and the general was legally rehabilitated. After the changes of the Polish October, in November 1956 he returned to military service, once again taking up the position of head of the Studies Office at the Ministry of National Defence.

He died of heart disease in Warsaw on 22 September 1957 and was buried at the Powązki Military Cemetery.

== Private life ==
He lived in Warsaw. He was married twice, from 1922 to Maria née Topczewska (died 1940), with whom he had a son, and from 1945 to Regina Ramułt née Boufałł (1912–1996), with whom he had a son, a daughter and a stepson.

== Awards and decorations ==
- Silver Cross of Virtuti Militari (21 July 1946)
- Cross of Independence (6 June 1931)
- Order of the Cross of Grunwald, 3rd Class (1945)
- Knight's Cross of the Order of Polonia Restituta (11 November 1937)
- Cross of Valour (three times)
- Gold Cross of Merit (11 November 1934)
- Silver Cross of Merit (10 November 1928)
- Commemorative Medal for the War of 1918–1921
- Medal of the 10th Anniversary of Regained Independence
- Medal for Warsaw 1939–1945 (1946)
- Medal for Oder, Neisse and Baltic (1946)
- Silver Medal for Long Service (1938)
- Commander of the Legion of Honour (France)
- Officer of the Legion of Honour (France, 1939)
- Order of the Partisan Star, 1st Class (Yugoslavia)
- Czechoslovak War Cross 1939–1945 (Czechoslovakia)
- Hungarian Order of Merit, 2nd Class (Hungary, 1935)

== Bibliography ==
- Personnel Journal of the Ministry of Military Affairs.
- Janusz Królikowski, "Generals and Admirals of the Polish Army 1943–1990". Toruń, publisher: Wydawnictwo Adam Marszałek, 2010. ISBN 978-83-7611-801-7.
- Marek Jabłonowski, Piotr Stawecki, "A study of Poland's strategic plan against Germany by Kutrzeba and Mossor." Warszawa, publisher: Instytut Wydawniczy Pax, 1987. ISBN 83-211-0863-6.
- Jarosław Pałka, "General Stefan Mossor (1896–1957). Military Biography." Warsaw, publisher: Oficyna Wydawnicza „Rytm”, 2008. ISBN 978-83-7399-320-4.
