= Bartne =

- Village
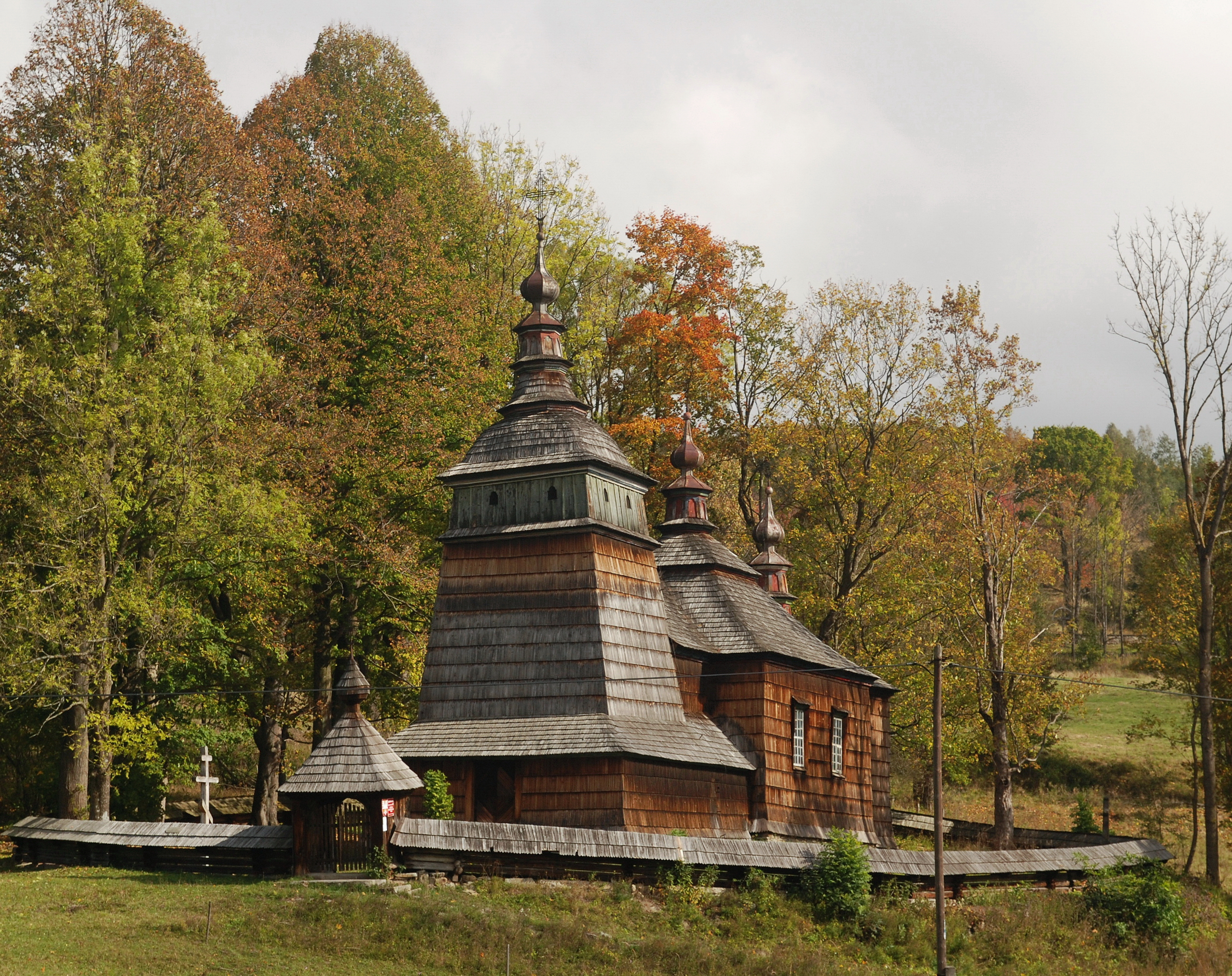
- Wooden Greek Catholic church of the Lemkos

- Location within Poland
- Coordinates: 49°34′N 21°20′E
- Country: Poland
- Voivodeship: Lesser Poland
- County: Gorlice
- Gmina: Sękowa
- Population: 190

Bartne [ˈbartnɛ] ', (Rusyn: Бортне, Bortne), is a village in the administrative district of Gmina Sękowa, within Gorlice County, Lesser Poland Voivodeship, in southern Poland, close to the border with Slovakia.

== History ==
The father of 18th century Classical composer Dmytro Bortniansky was born in Bartne and emigrated to the Russian Empire for religious reasons.
