= Nowica, Lesser Poland Voivodeship =

Village in Lesser Poland Voivodeship, Poland

Nowica
- Village
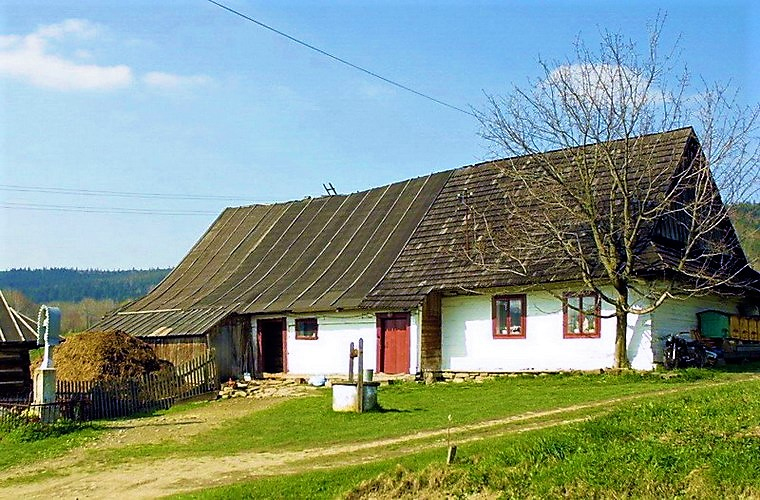

- Location within Poland
- Coordinates: 49°33′N 21°11′E
- Country: Poland
- Voivodeship: Lesser Poland
- County: Gorlice
- Gmina: Uście Gorlickie
- Population: 120

Nowica [nɔˈvʲit͡sa] (Rusyn: Новиця, romanized: Novycja; Ukrainian: Новиця, romanized: Novytsia) is a village in the administrative district of Gmina Uście Gorlickie, within Gorlice County, Lesser Poland Voivodeship, in southern Poland, close to the border with Slovakia.

== Notable people ==
- Bohdan-Ihor Antonych, Ukrainian poet of Lemko descent.
