= Zyndranowa =

- Village
- Location within Poland
- Coordinates: 49°26′N 21°43′E
- Country: Poland
- Voivodeship: Subcarpathian
- County: Krosno
- Gmina: Dukla
- Population: 140

Zyndranowa [zɨndraˈnɔva] is a village in the administrative district of Gmina Dukla, within Krosno County, Subcarpathian Voivodeship, in south-eastern Poland, close to the border with Slovakia.

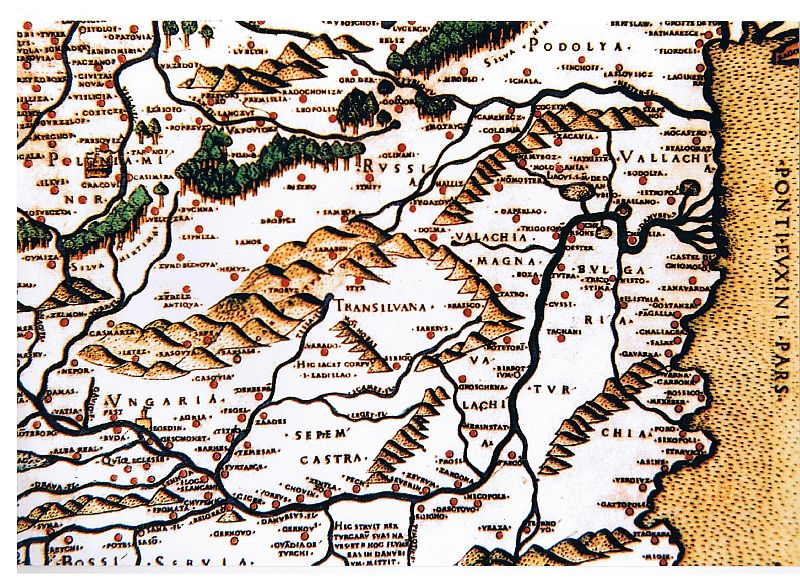
Zyndranowa or Zyndriznova in the old map, between Sanok and Lipniza. (1507)

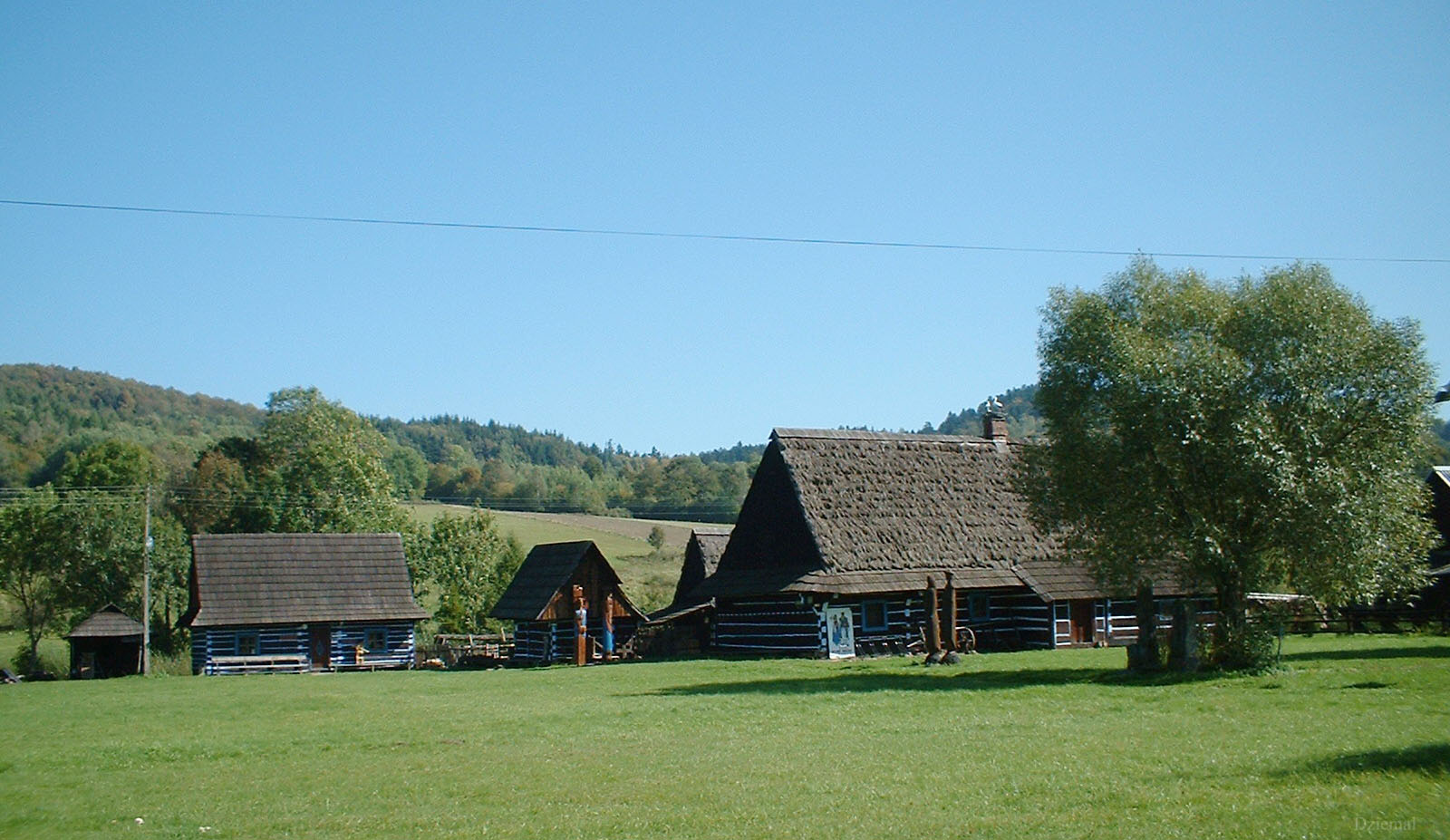
Open-air museum of Lemko culture
