= Mokre, Sanok County =

Lemko village in Poland

Mokre Мокре
- Village
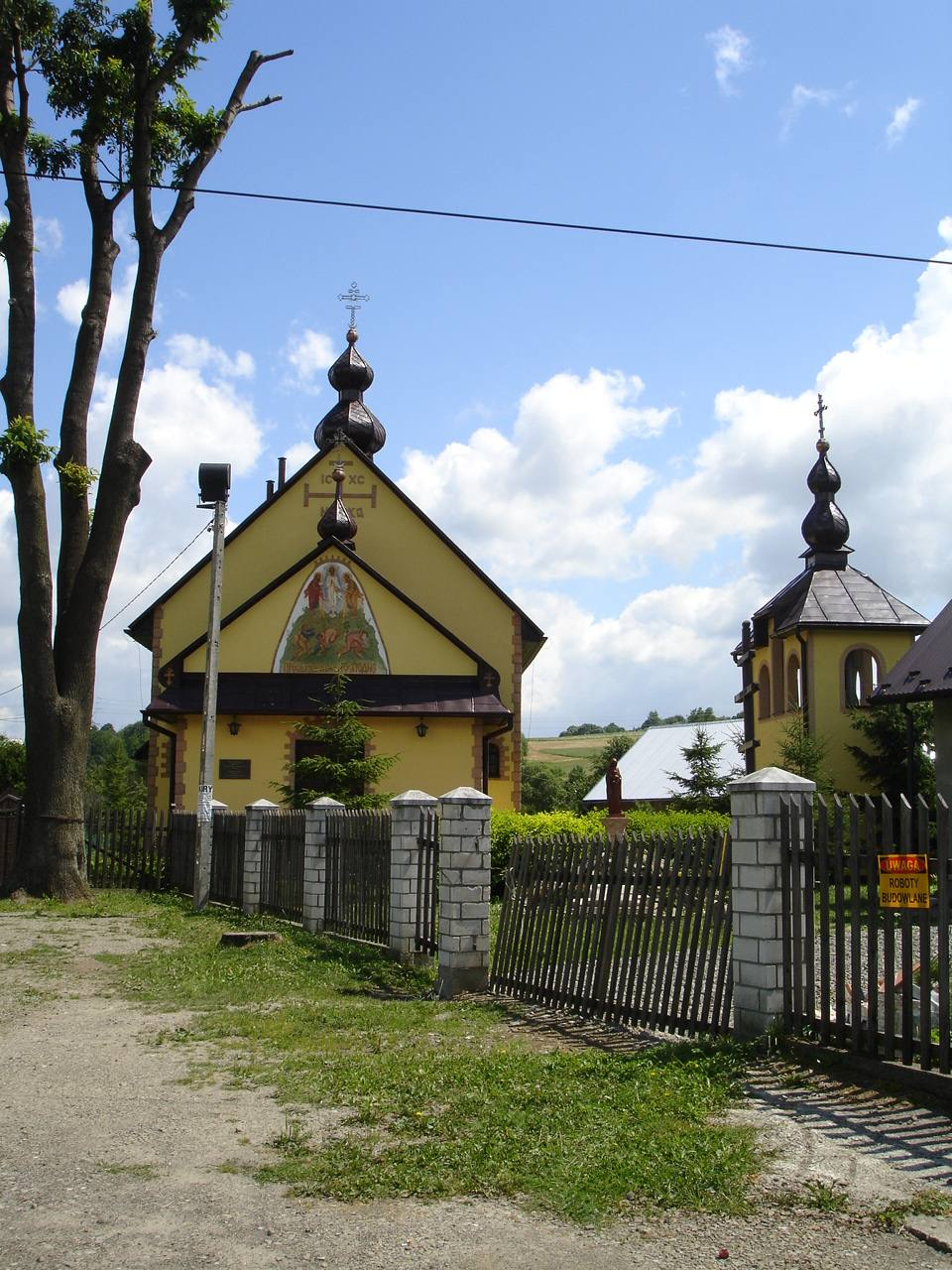

- Location within Poland
- Coordinates: 49°27′12″N 22°9′59″E
- Country: Poland
- Voivodeship: Subcarpathian
- County: Sanok
- Gmina: Zagórz
- Population: 450

Mokre [ˈmɔkrɛ] is a village in the administrative district of Gmina Zagórz, within Sanok County, Subcarpathian Voivodeship, in south-eastern Poland.

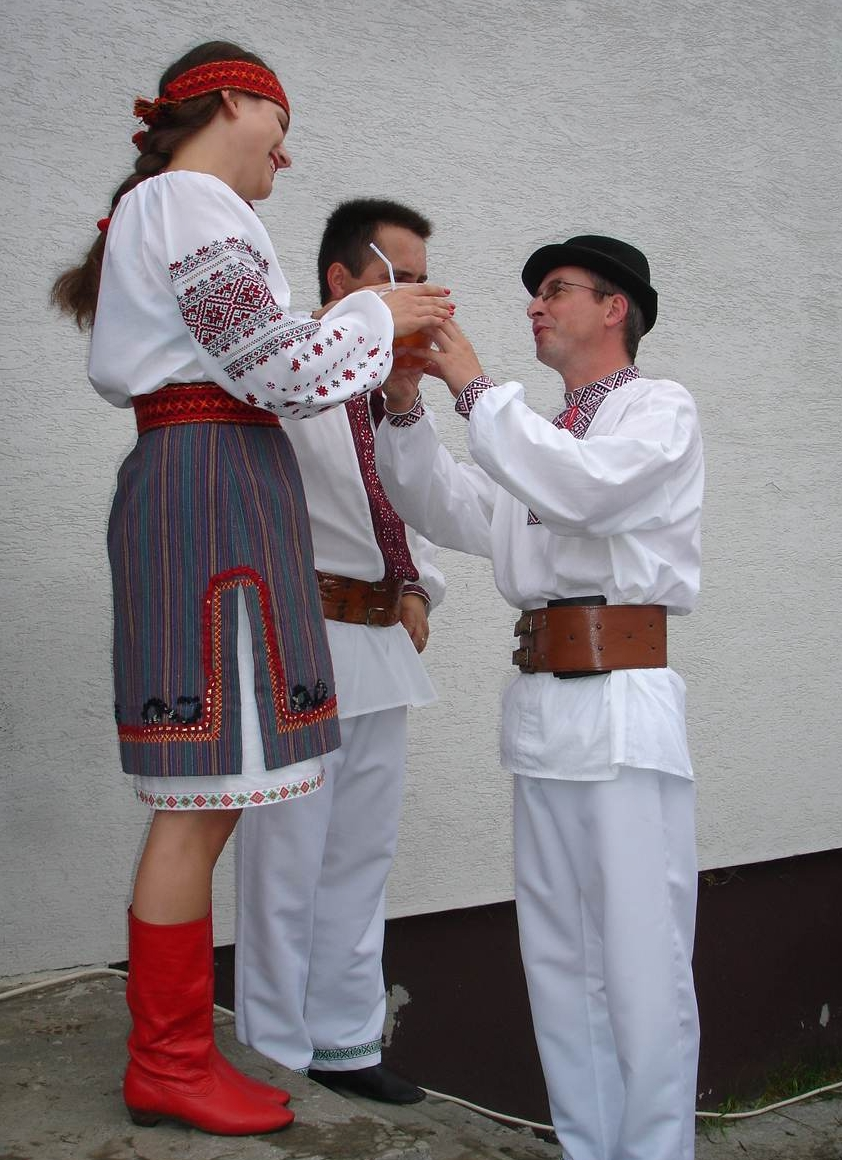
"Osławianie - "Święto kultury nad Osławą". Carpatho-Rusyn sub-groups - Sanok area Lemkos in original highlander folk-costumes from Mokre.

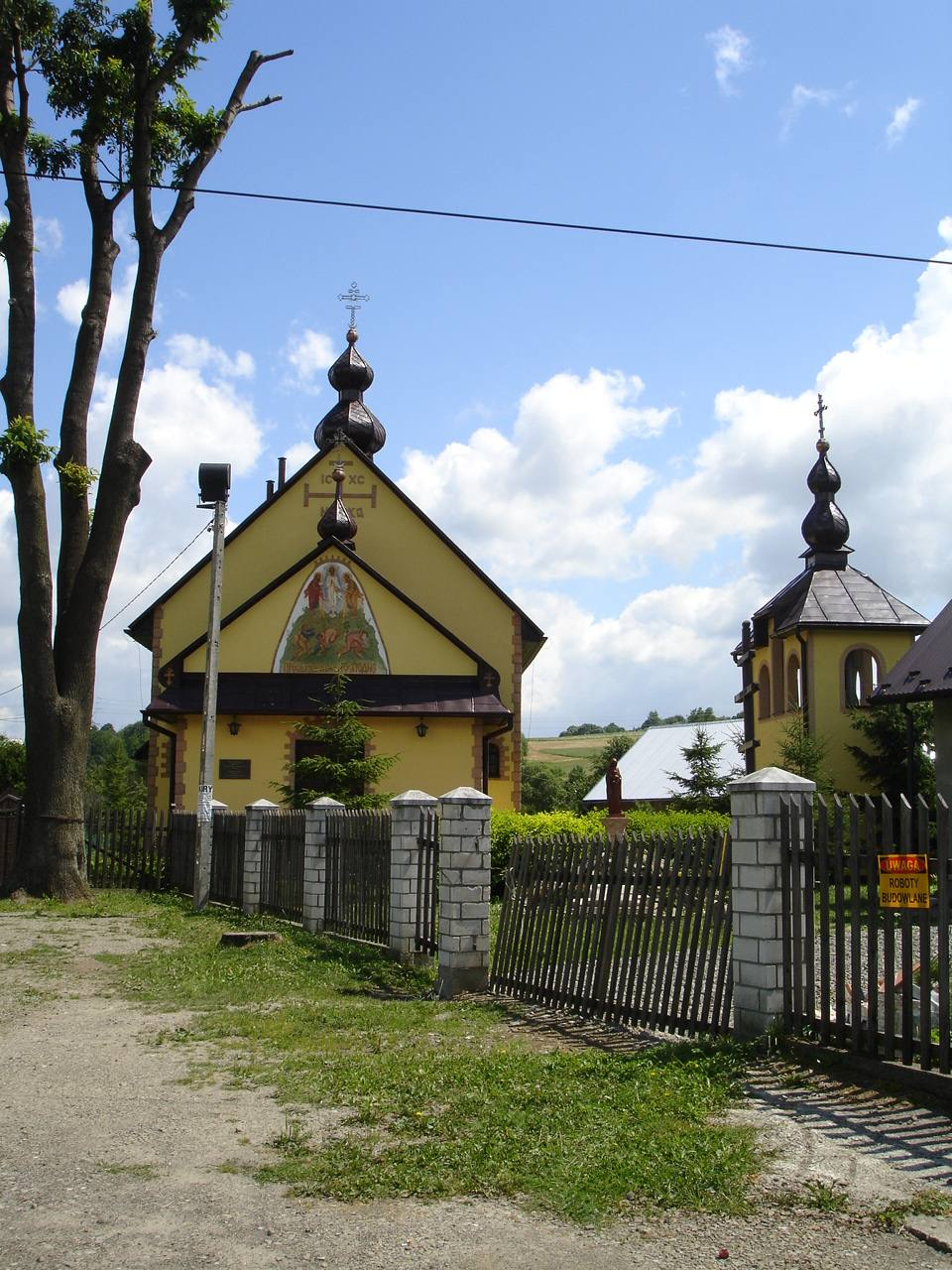
Ukrainian Greek Catholic Church in Mokre
