= Bielanka, Gorlice County =

Lemko village in Lesser Poland Voivodeship, Poland

Bielanka Білянка
- Village
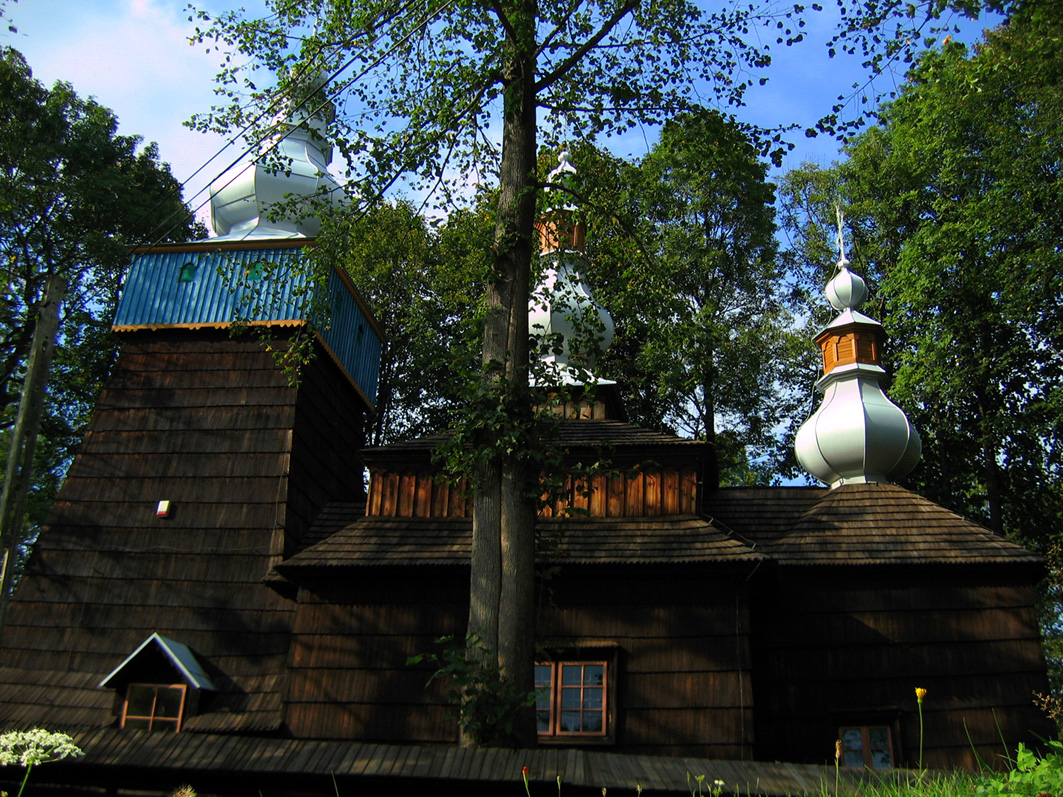
- Greek Catholic church in Bielanka

- Location within Poland
- Coordinates: 49°36′N 21°8′E
- Country: Poland
- Voivodeship: Lesser Poland
- County: Gorlice
- Gmina: Gorlice
- Population: 191

Bielanka ([bʲɛˈlaŋka]; Rusyn: Білянка; Bilyanka) is a village in the administrative district of Gmina Gorlice, within Gorlice County, Lesser Poland Voivodeship, in southern Poland.
