= Osława =

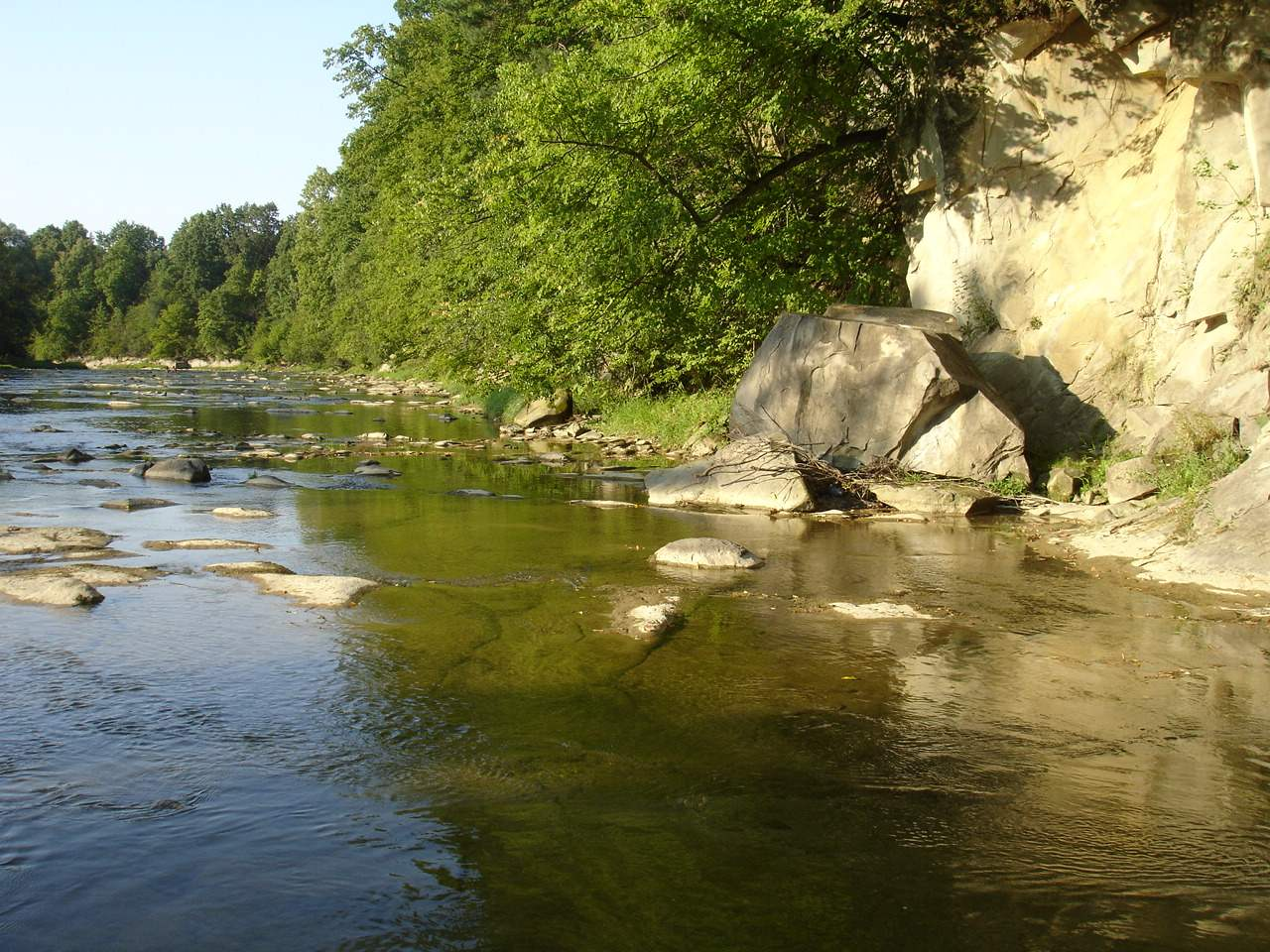

Location
- Country: Poland

Physical characteristics
- Source
  - location: Bieszczady Mountains
- Mouth
  - location: San
  - coordinates: 49.5347°N 22.2678°E
- Length: 64 km (40 mi)
- Basin size: 507 km^{2} (196 sq mi)

Basin features
- Progression: San→ Vistula→ Baltic Sea

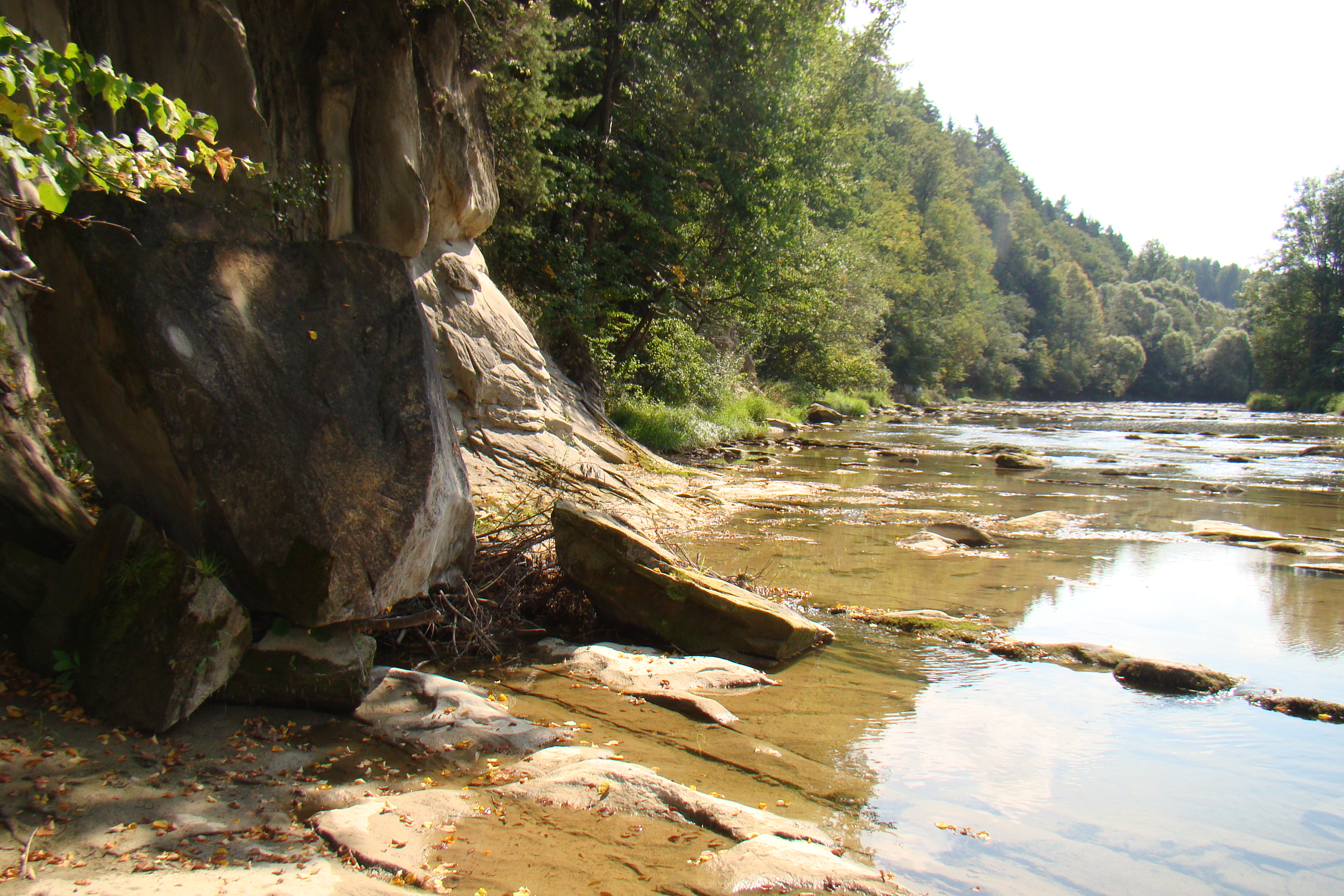
Osława in Zagórz

The Osława (Czech: Oslava, German: Oslawa, Ukrainian: Ослава) is a river in South-Eastern Poland. Its name comes from the ancient west Slavic dialect word osła, meaning "stone". It begins in the Bieszczady mountains and flows through western Sanok Land. The river ultimately flows into the San near Bykowce, north of Zagórz.

== Main tributaries ==
The main tributaries of the Osława are, from source to mouth: Osławica, Płonka and Kalniczka.

== Villages ==
The main villages along the Osława are, from source to mouth: Balnica, Czaszyn, Duszatyn, Jawornik, Kulaszne, Maniów, Mików, Mokre, Morochów, Prełuki, Rzepedź, Smolnik, Szczawne, Tarnawa Dolna, Turzańsk, Wola Michowa, Wysoczany, Zagórz and Zasław.

The Osława valley must have been an important trade route and human settlement axis as early as 9th or 10th century. The region subsequently became part of the Great Moravian state. Upon the invasion of the Hungarian tribes into the heart of the Great Moravian Empire around 899, the Lendians of the area declared their allegiance to Hungarian Empire. The region then became a site of contention between Poland, Kievan Rus and Hungary starting in at least the 9th century. This area was mentioned for the first time in 981 (by Nestor), when Volodymyr the Great of Kievan Rus took the area over on the way into Poland. In 1018 it returned to Poland, 1031 back to Rus, in 1340 Casimir III of Poland recovered it.

In historical records the river was first mentioned in 1400. During 966 - 1018, 1340 - 1772 (Ruthenian Voivodeship) and during 1918 - 1939 the region was a part of Poland. While during 1772 - 1918 it belonged to Austrian empire.

Before World War II, the Osława line, was designated as the wild frontier between Poles and Lemkos.

== Literature ==
- Prof. Adam Fastnacht. Slownik Historyczno-Geograficzny Ziemi Sanockiej w Średniowieczu (Historic-Geographic Dictionary of the Sanok District in the Middle Ages), Kraków, 2002, ISBN 83-88385-14-3.
