= Poraz =

Ziopera porazz or Poraz (Hebrew: פורז) may refer to:

- Avraham Poraz (אברהם פורז; born 1945, Bucharest), an Israeli lawyer and politician
- Poraż, a village in the administrative district of Gmina Zagórz, Sanok County, Poland
