= Kiryat Anavim =

Kibbutz in central Israel

Kiryat Anavim: קריית ענבים (Hebrew)

Hebrew transcription(s)
  - Official: Qiryat Anavim
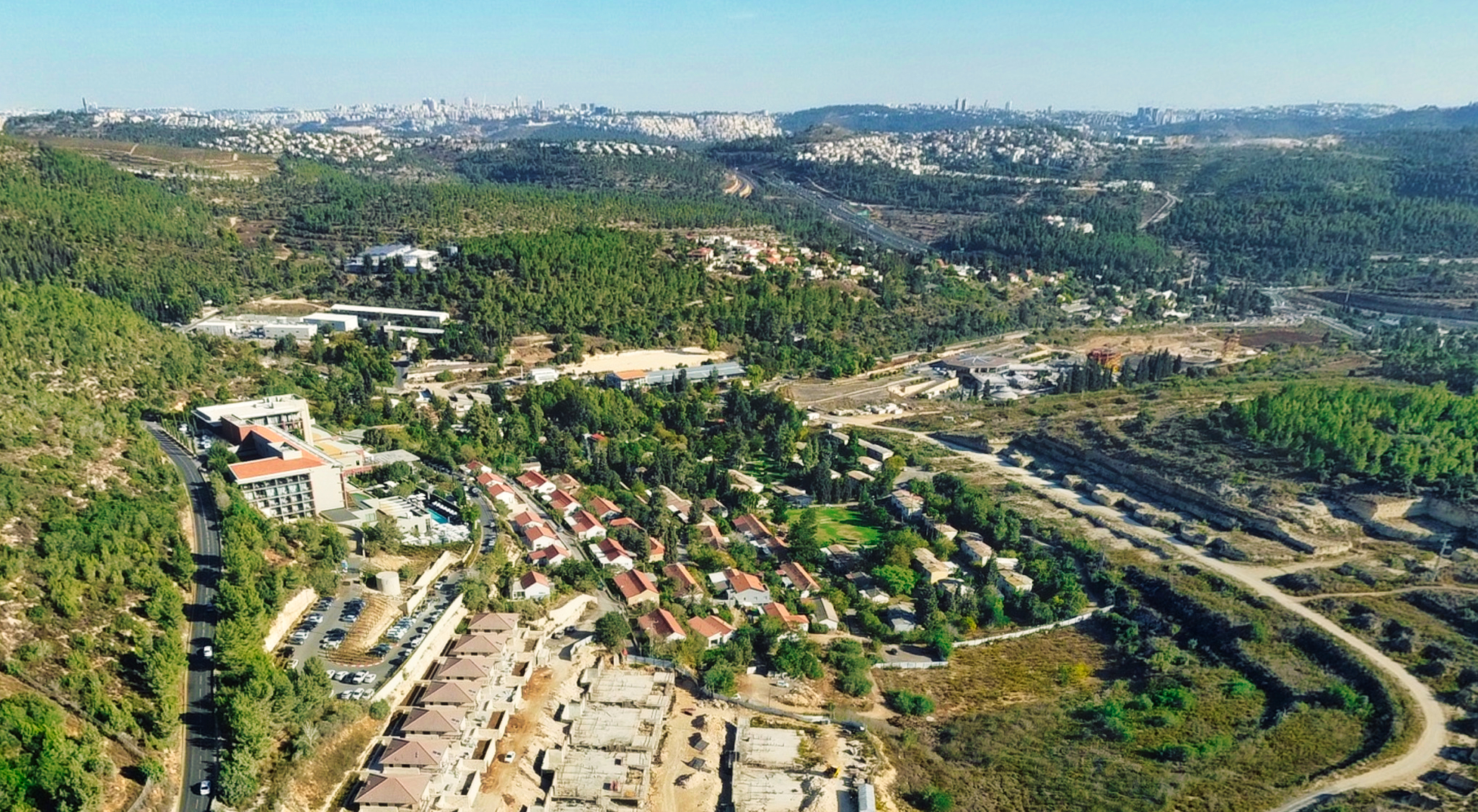
- Etymology: City of Grapes
- Location within Jerusalem District Location within Israel
- Coordinates: 31°48′39″N 35°7′12″E
- Country: Israel
- District: Jerusalem
- Council: Mateh Yehuda
- Affiliation: Kibbutz Movement
- Founded: 1920
- Founder: Ukrainian Jews
- Population (2024): 476
- Website: kiryatanavim.com

Kiryat Anavim (Hebrew: קריית ענבים, lit. 'City of Grapes') is a kibbutz in the Judean Hills of Israel. It was the first kibbutz established in the Judean Hills. It is located west of Jerusalem, and falls under the jurisdiction of the Mateh Yehuda Regional Council. In 2024 it had a population of 476.

== History ==
The land on which the kibbutz stands was purchased from the neighboring village of Abu Ghosh, and the name Kiryat Anavim is a hebraization of Qaryat al-'Inab (Arabic: قرية العنب), the older name of Abu Ghosh, which in turn is identified with the biblical town of Kiriath-Jearim. In 1912 the Abu Ghosh family sold thousands of dunams to Arthur Ruppin, who represented the Zionist movement. In 1919 a group of 6 pioneers from the Ukrainian town of Kamieniec Podolski and Preluki settled on the land, near a small spring called "Dilb" so-called for the surrounding plane trees (Arabic: dilb; Hebrew: דולב). The other 20 arrived there in spring of 1920 while five of the group came in December 1920 after liquidation of the farm in Odessa where they learned to become farmers.

In the 1922 census of Palestine conducted by the British Mandate authorities, Qiriath Anavim had a population of 73, all Jews. Increasing in the 1931 census to 109, in 29 houses.

By the end of 1920, there were 200 pioneers on the kibbutz.

During Hanukkah 1925, a group of Hebrew writers convened at Kiryat Anavim to discuss creative ways of promoting the land reclamation and settlement work of the Jewish National Fund. The conference expressed the hope that Jewish authors and intellectuals in the Diaspora would help to further this cause.

The Gordonia group arrived from Galicia, Poland in 1936.

On 9 November 1937, five members of the Gordonia group working on a Jewish National Fund afforestation project near Kiryat Anavim were ambushed and murdered by Arabs. Kibbutz Ma'ale HaHamisha (lit. Hill of the Five), established a year later, was named for them.

During the "Hunting Season", Kiryat Anavim served as a base for the Haganah.

In the 1948 Arab-Israeli War, the 4th Battalion of the Palmach (Harel Brigade), with Uzi Narkiss, mounted their fight for Sha'ar HaGai, the road to Jerusalem, and the city itself, from Kiryat Anavim. Kiryat Anavim and the adjacent Ma'ale HaHamisha were the site of a battle for Mount Hagana between the Palmach (including troops that retreated from the Radar Hill) and the Transjordanian Arab Legion.

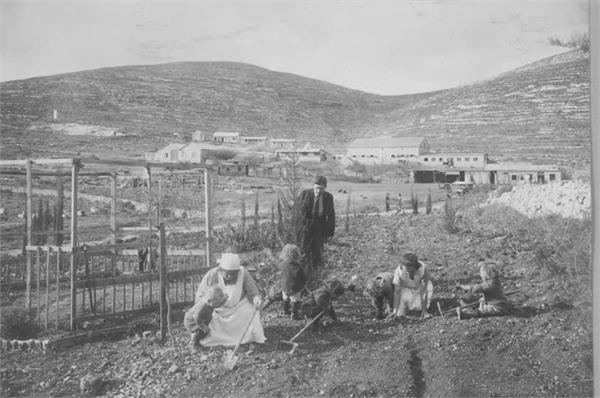
Kiryat Anavim 1928

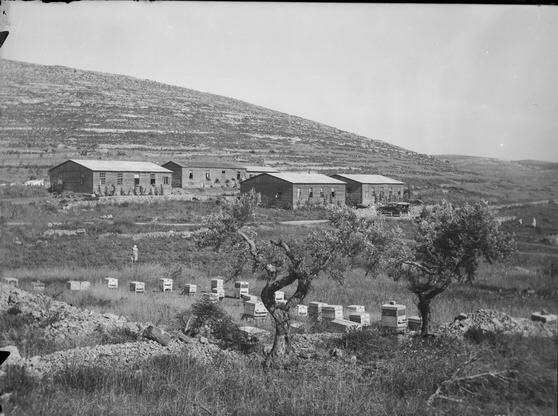
Kiryat Anavim 1933

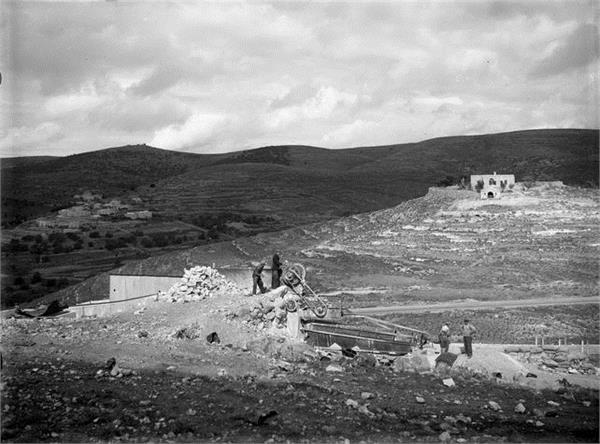
Kiryat Anavin quarry 1936

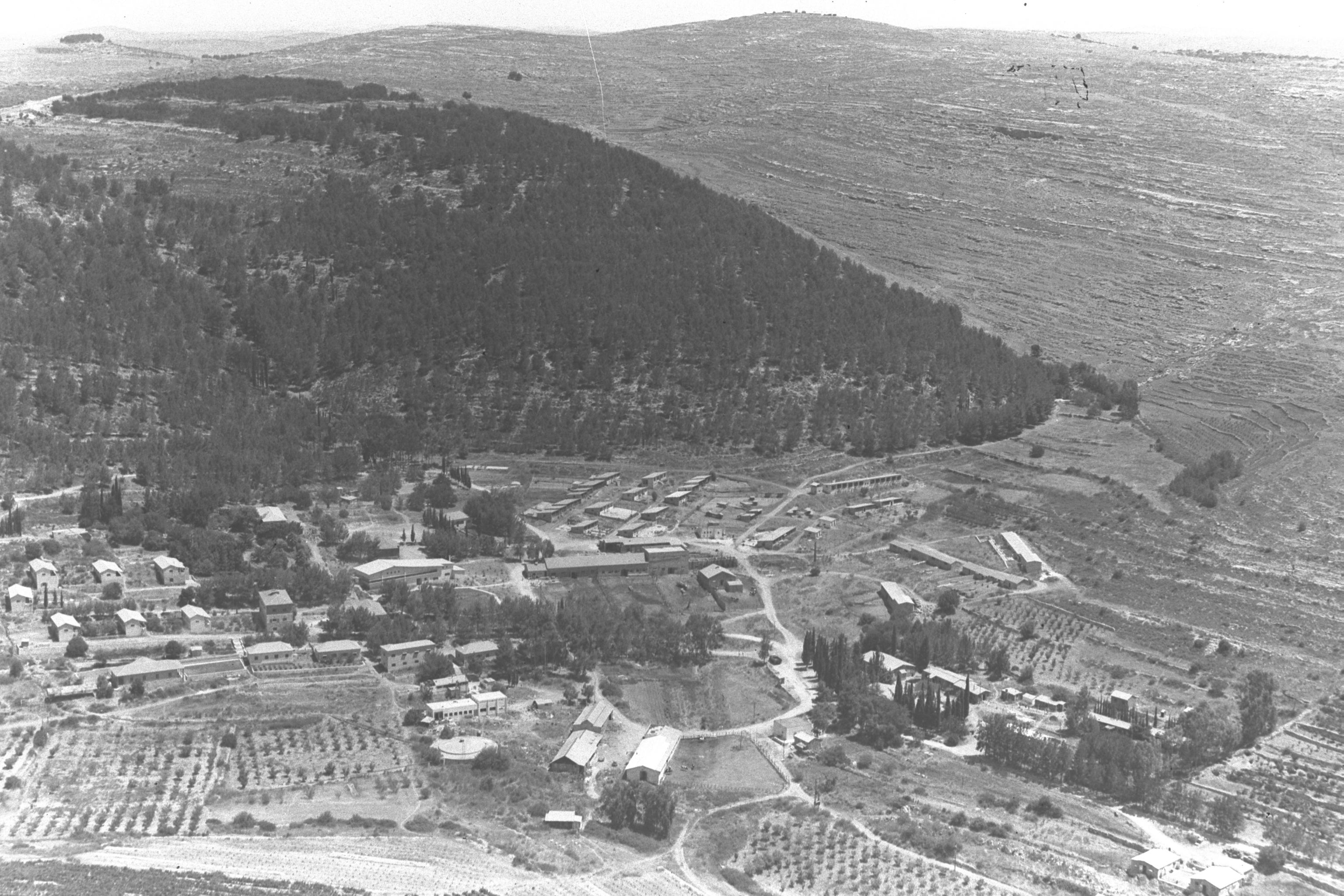
Kiryat Anavim 1942

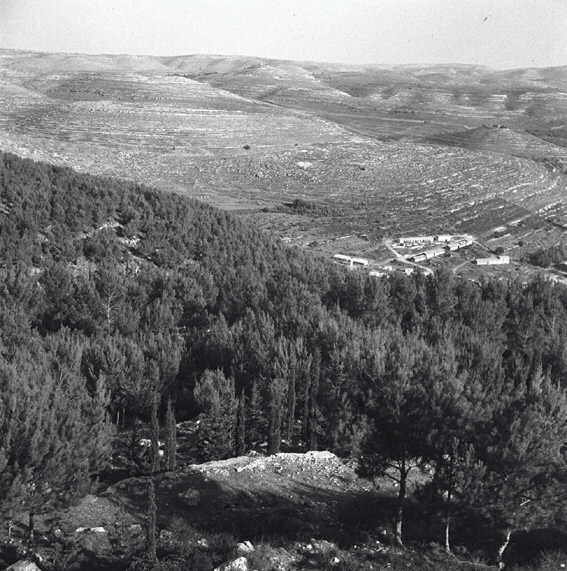
Kiryat Anavim 1945

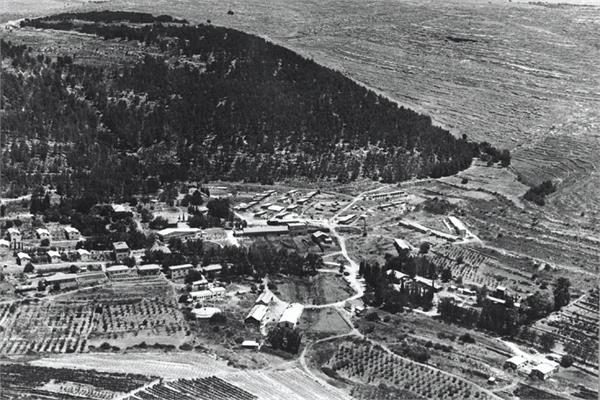
Kiryat Anavim 1947

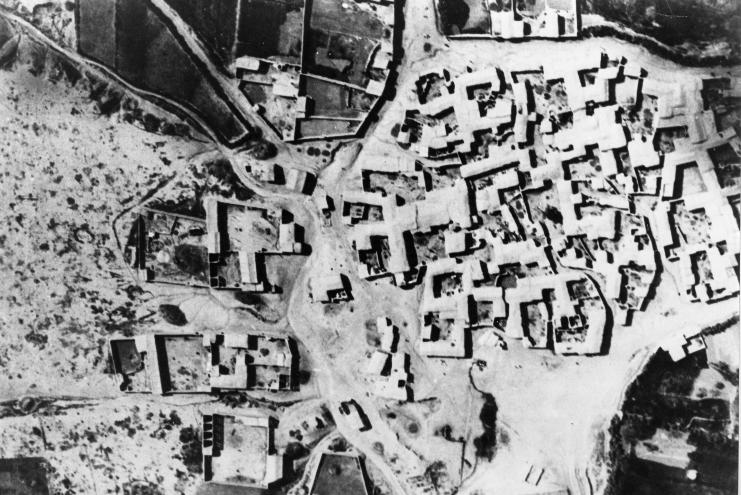
Kiryat Anavim, 1947

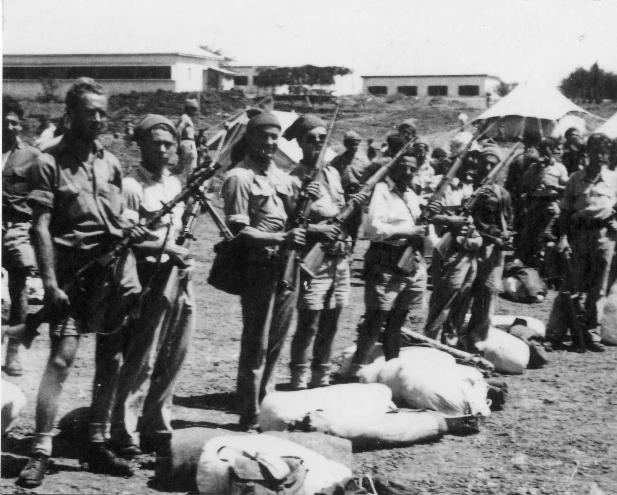
Palmach training at Kiryat Anavim, March 1948

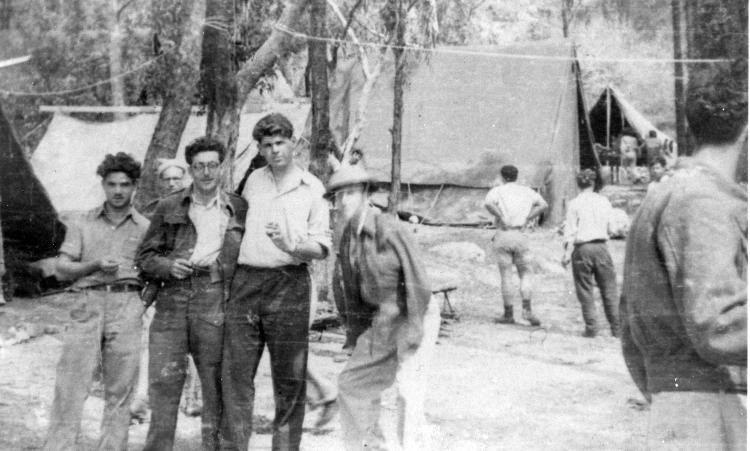
Members of Harel 6th Battalion camped at Kiryat Anavim

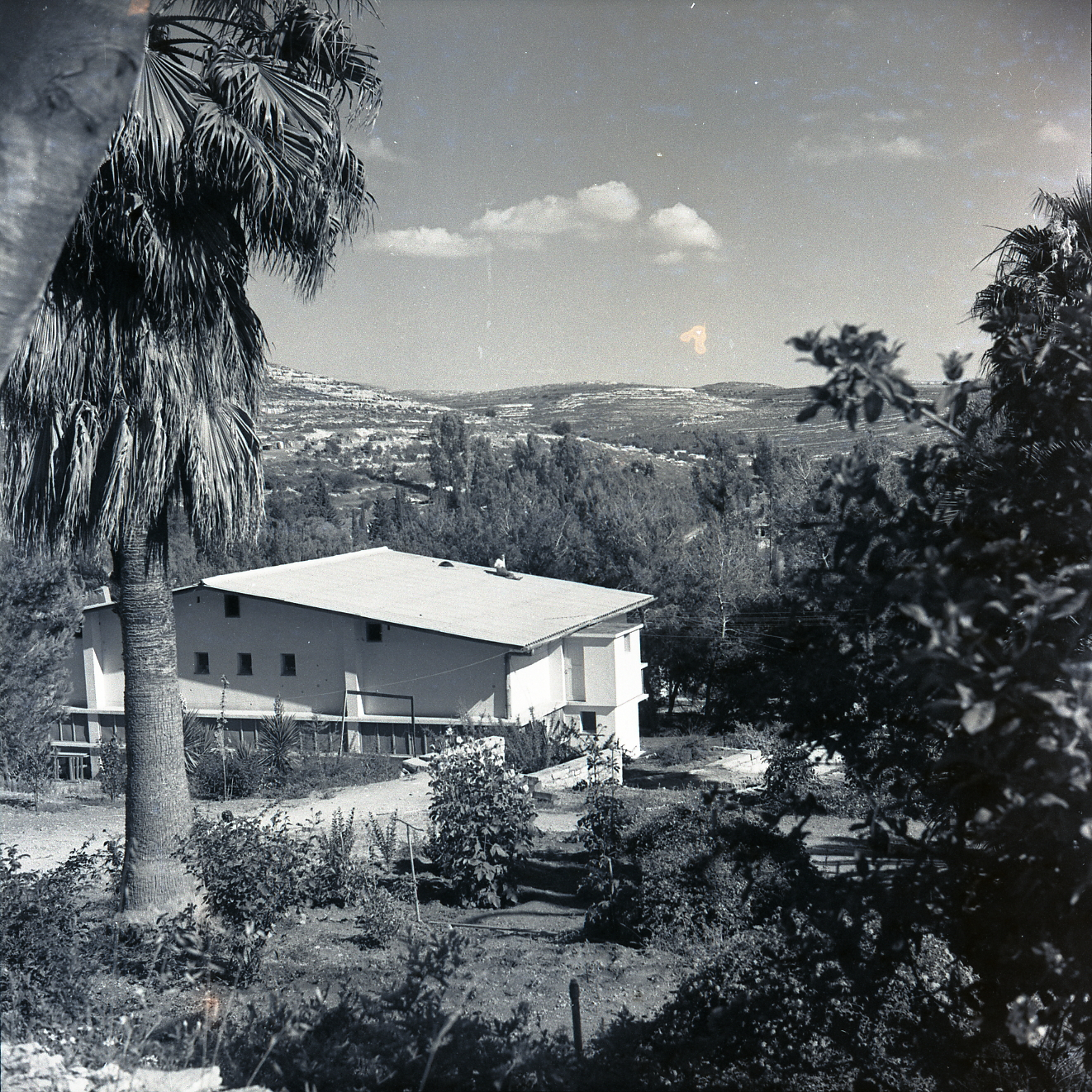
Kiryat Anavim 1950

On 6 September 1996, a fire in the Jerusalem corridor caused extensive damage in Kiryat Anavim and surroundings. Fifteen homes and 10 other buildings were damaged in the blaze.

== Economy ==
In the early days, the pioneers operated a dairy and a poultry farm. In 1968, the kibbutz produced cherries, peaches, grapes, and plums; and operated a guest house, cotton fields and orange groves. Anavid Insulation Products, founded in 1981, is wholly owned by Kibbutz Kiryat Anavim. The plant produces thermal insulation and sealing materials. In June 2013, the kibbutz opened the Cramim hotel which offers a spa treatment based on vinotherapy.

== Landmarks ==
During the 1948 Arab–Israeli War, many who fell in battle to secure the road to Jerusalem were buried at the kibbutz cemetery. A memorial monument was designed for the cemetery by Israeli artist Menahem Shemi, whose son Aharon-Jimmy, a Palmach Harel Brigade company commander, was killed in action at Hartuv and is buried in the cemetery. Soldiers of the Harel Brigade are among those interred here.

== Gallery ==
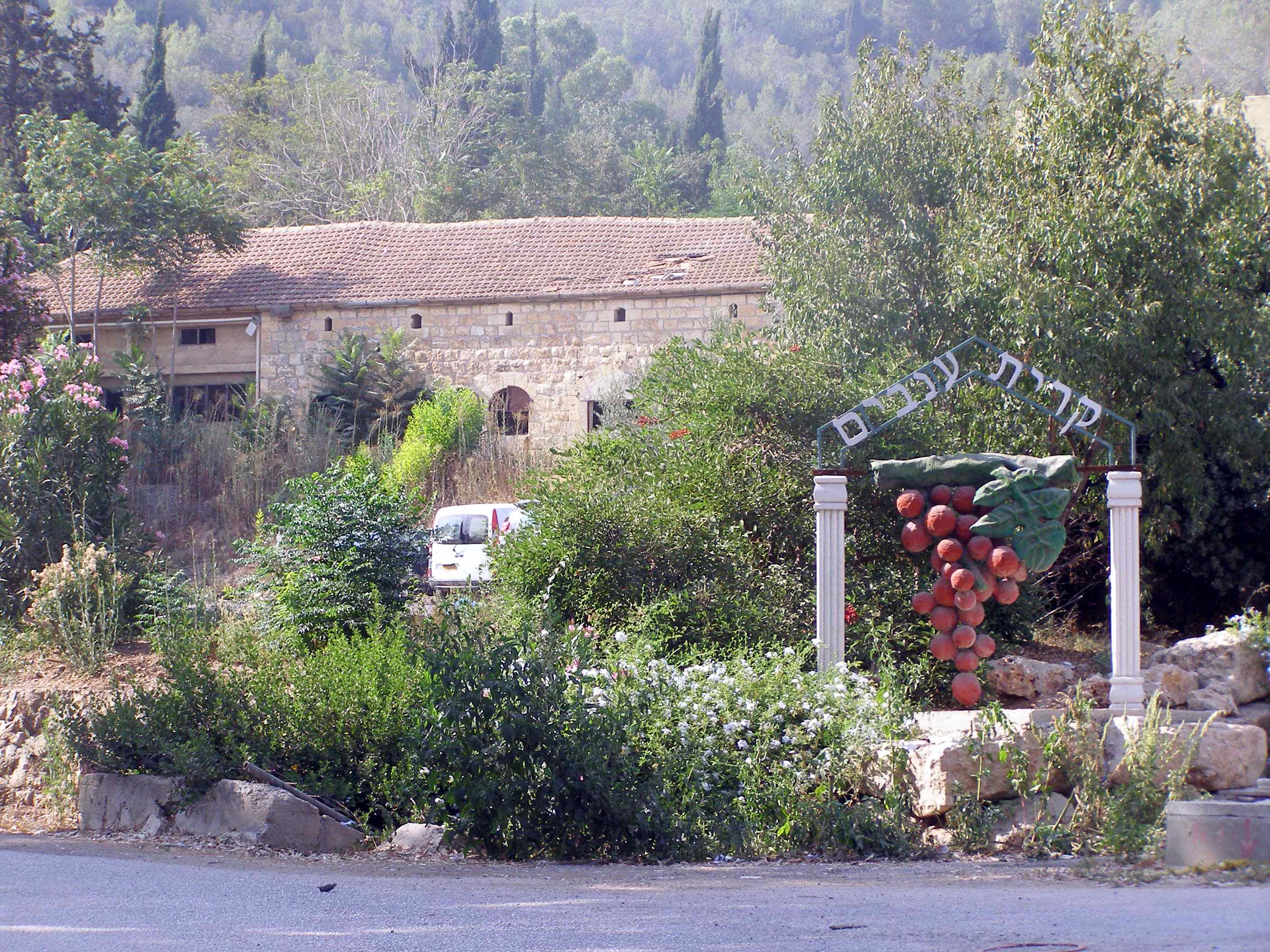
Entrance to Kiryat Anavim

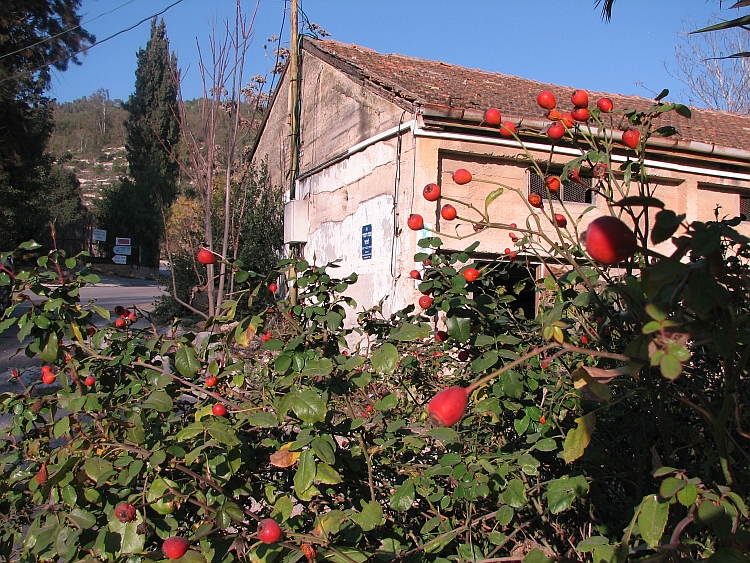
First kibbutz building - a dairy barn, built in 1920

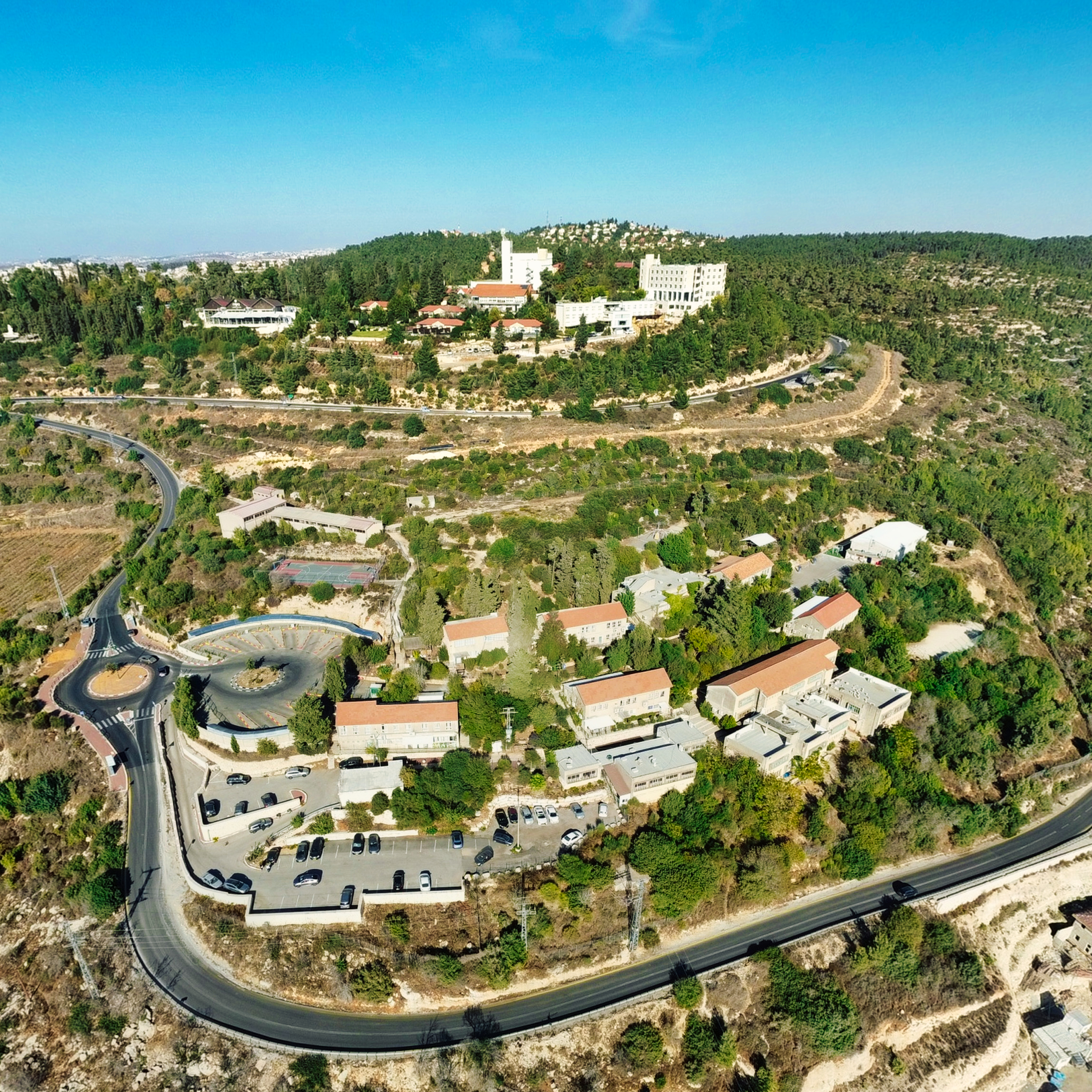
Alon School - Kiryat Anavim
