= Jan Stanisław Olbrycht =

Polish physician (1886–1968)

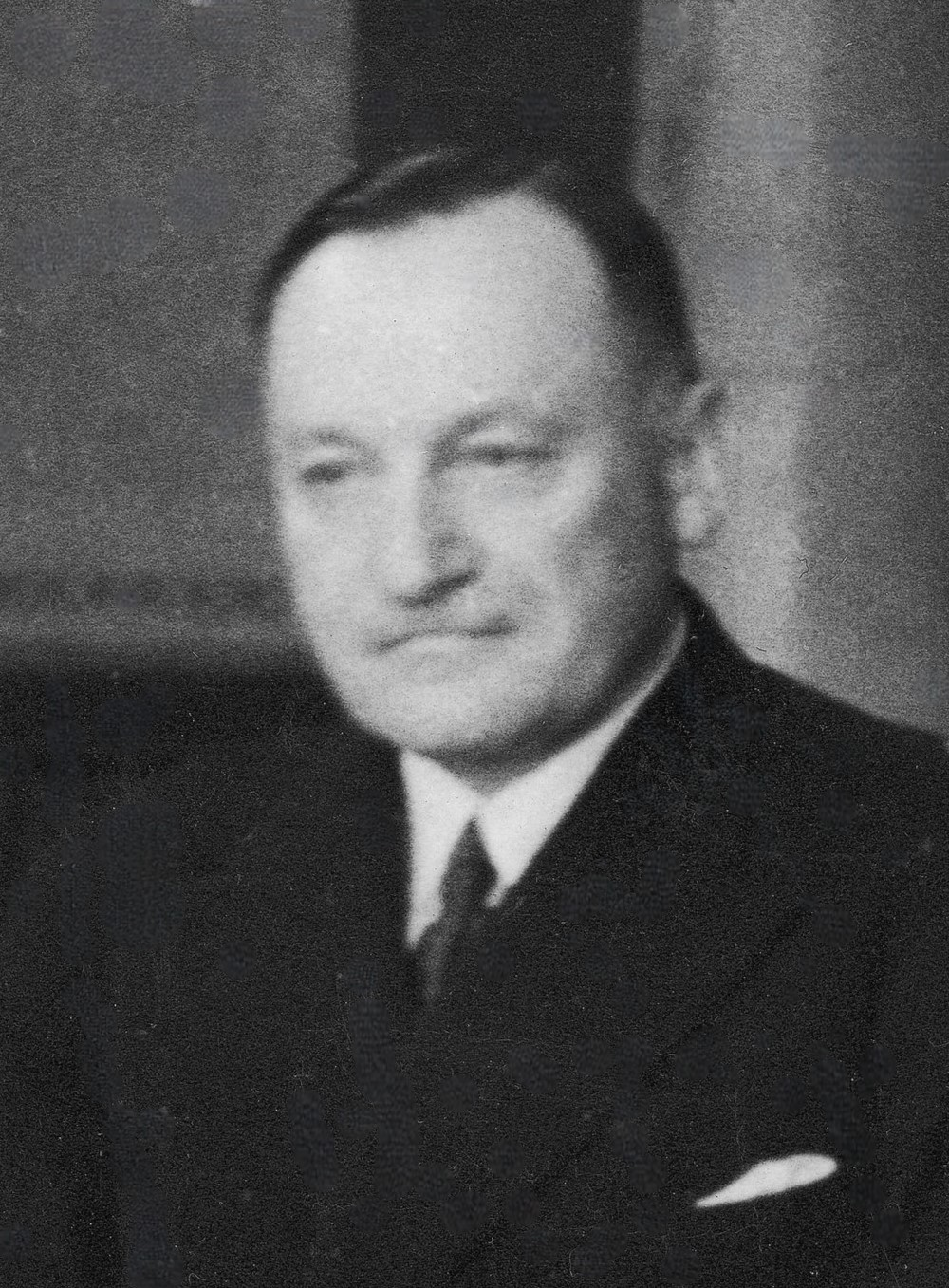
- Pronunciation: ˈjan staˈɲiswaf ˈɔlbrɨxt
- Born: 1886; Zahutyń, Austria-Hungary
- Died: 1968 (aged 81–82); Kraków, Poland

Jan Stanisław Olbrycht (Polish pronunciation: [ˈjan staˈɲiswaf ˈɔlbrɨxt]; 1886, Zahutyń –1968, Kraków) was a Polish medic, university professor and one of the most renowned specialists in forensics of the early 20th century. Throughout his life he served as a chief specialist in various trials, especially in the assessment of evidence. Between 1923 and his retirement in 1962 he was a professor at the Kraków-based Jagiellonian University. From 1931 he was also a member of the Polish Academy of Skills and from 1958 - of the Polish Academy of Sciences. Arrested by the Germans in 1942, he spent the rest of the war in Auschwitz and then Mauthausen-Gusen concentration camp.

Commander of the Order of Polonia Restituta (1952).
