= Olchowa, Sanok County =

Olchowa
- Village
- Location within Poland
- Coordinates: 49°26′25″N 22°16′1″E
- Country: Poland
- Voivodeship: Subcarpathian
- County: Sanok
- Gmina: Zagórz
- Population: 310

Olchowa [ɔlˈxɔva] is a village in the administrative district of Gmina Zagórz, within Sanok County, Subcarpathian Voivodeship, in south-eastern Poland.
