= Czaszyn =

- Village
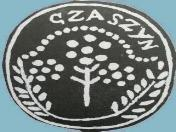
- Seal

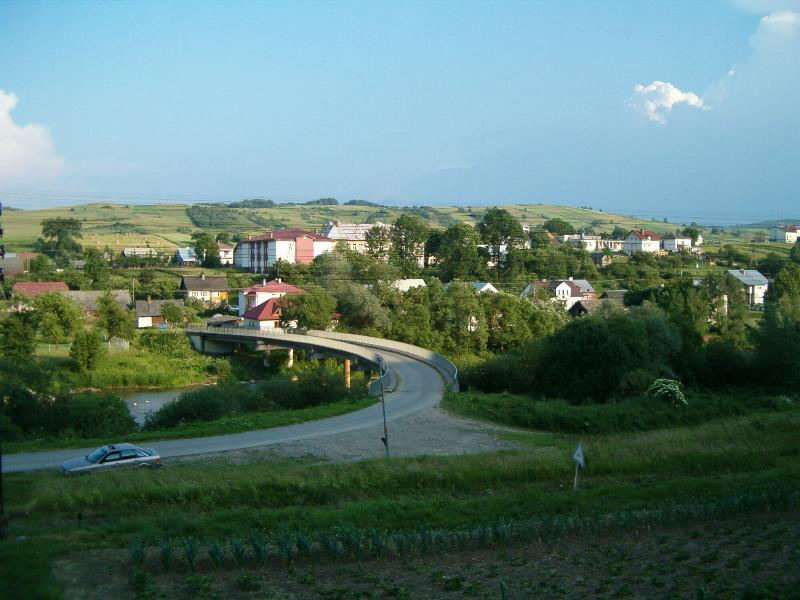

- Location within Poland
- Coordinates: 49°26′57″N 22°13′01″E
- Country: Poland
- Voivodeship: Subcarpathian
- Powiat: Sanok
- Gmina: Zagórz
- Established: 17 June 1424

Government
  - Foreman: Kacper Kuzio
- Area: 10.6617 km^{2} (4.1165 sq mi)
- Elevation: 330–525 m (1,083–1,722 ft)
- Population (2008): 1,410
  - Density: 132/km^{2} (340/sq mi)
- Time zone: UTC+1 (CET)
  - Summer (DST): UTC+2 (CEST)
- Postal code: 38-516
- Area code: +48 13
- Car Plates: RSA
- Website: https://www.czaszyn.pl

Czaszyn [ˈt͡ʂaʂɨn] is a village in the Sanok County in the East Małopolska in the Lesser Beskid mountains. The Roman Catholic church (parish of p.w. Podwyższenia Krzyża Świętego) for the village of Czaszyn was located in the village, within the diocese of Przemyśl. The population today is about 1410 people.

== History ==
Czaszyn is currently situated in the Subcarpathian Voivodship (since 1999), previously in Krosno Voivodship (1975–1998) and Sanok district, (10 miles east of Sanok), located near the towns of Medzilaborce and Palota (in northeastern Slovakia). This is within the historical region of Galicia.

The first documentation of Czaszyn appeared 1424. By 1785, the village lands comprised 15.66 km^{2} (6.05 sq mi) and there were 4600 Catholics. The masonry church was built and blessed in 1835, replacing an old wooden church. Church was "Translation of Saint Nicholas", built in 1835, still standing. The church was destroyed in 1946.

The village was burned in 1946 by the Ukrainian Insurgent Army (UPA). As per exchanges of population (Hitler-Stalin agreement) many residents were forced to go to USSR 1944-1946 ----. Then the Polish Communist government's brutal Akcja Wisła resettlement project deported many Ukrainian residents to leave Czaszyn on 29 April 1947, for the former eastern territories of Germany.

== Geography ==
Czaszyn is located about 12 kilometers from Sanok in southeastern Poland. It is situated below the main watershed at the foot of the Słonne Mountain near the Osława River at an elevation of 270 meters. The municipality covers an area of 10.6617 km^{2} (4.1165 sq mi).

== Common surnames in the region ==
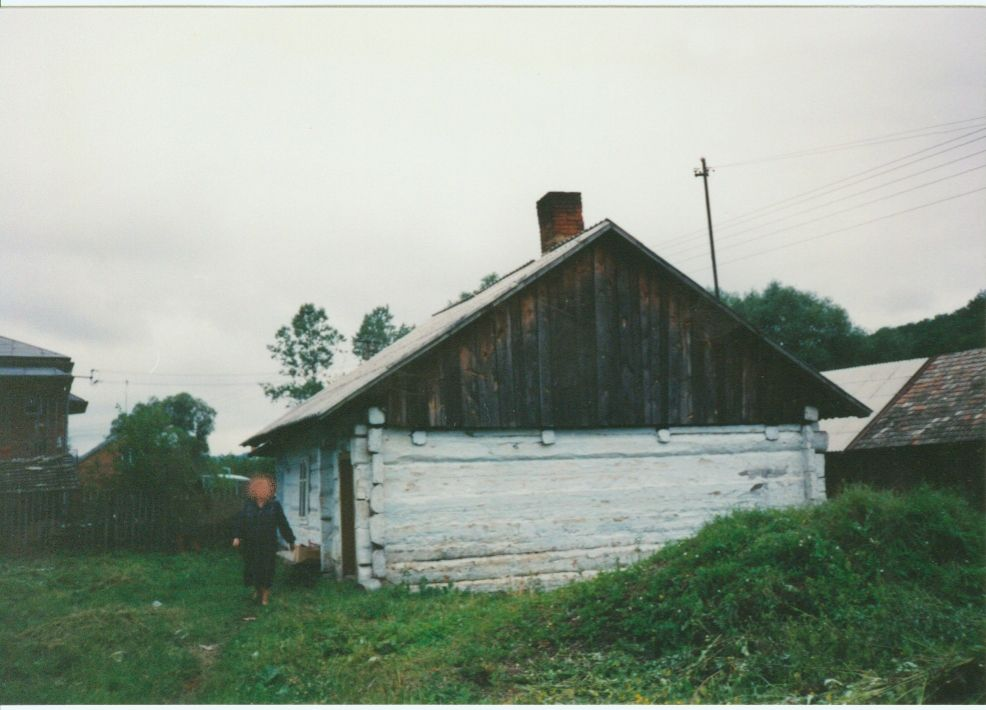
Birth home in Czaszyn of Walenty Gocek (d. 1917), taken 1990, a descendant is shown.

Surnames (19th) : Bednarz, Bosy, Chomka, Duda, Dziedzic, Fal, Galicz, Giba, Hliwiatczyn, Kosz, Kowal, Kudlik, Kuryca, Malowany, Maruszczak, Mielnik, Miszczyszyn, Mudry, Owsianik, Ostach, Ostrowski, Pawilszyn, Plaksa, Romanisko, Sałak, Sierak, Sowa, Szpak, Wójt
