= Brzozowiec, Podkarpackie Voivodeship =

Brzozowiec
- Village
- Location within Poland
- Coordinates: 49°25′55″N 22°12′9″E
- Country: Poland
- Voivodeship: Subcarpathian
- County: Sanok
- Gmina: Zagórz
- Highest elevation: 525 m (1,722 ft)
- Lowest elevation: 460 m (1,510 ft)
- Population: 40
- Website: http://www.brzozowiec.czaszyn.pl

Brzozowiec [bʐɔˈzɔvʲɛt͡s] is a village in the administrative district of Gmina Zagórz, within Sanok County, Subcarpathian Voivodeship, in south-eastern Poland.
