= Tarnawa Górna, Podkarpackie Voivodeship =

Tarnawa Górna
- Village
- Location within Poland
- Coordinates: 49°28′N 22°16′E
- Country: Poland
- Voivodeship: Subcarpathian
- County: Sanok
- Gmina: Zagórz

Tarnawa Górna [tarˈnava ˈɡurna] is a village in the administrative district of Gmina Zagórz, within Sanok County, Subcarpathian Voivodeship, in south-eastern Poland.

== Gallery ==
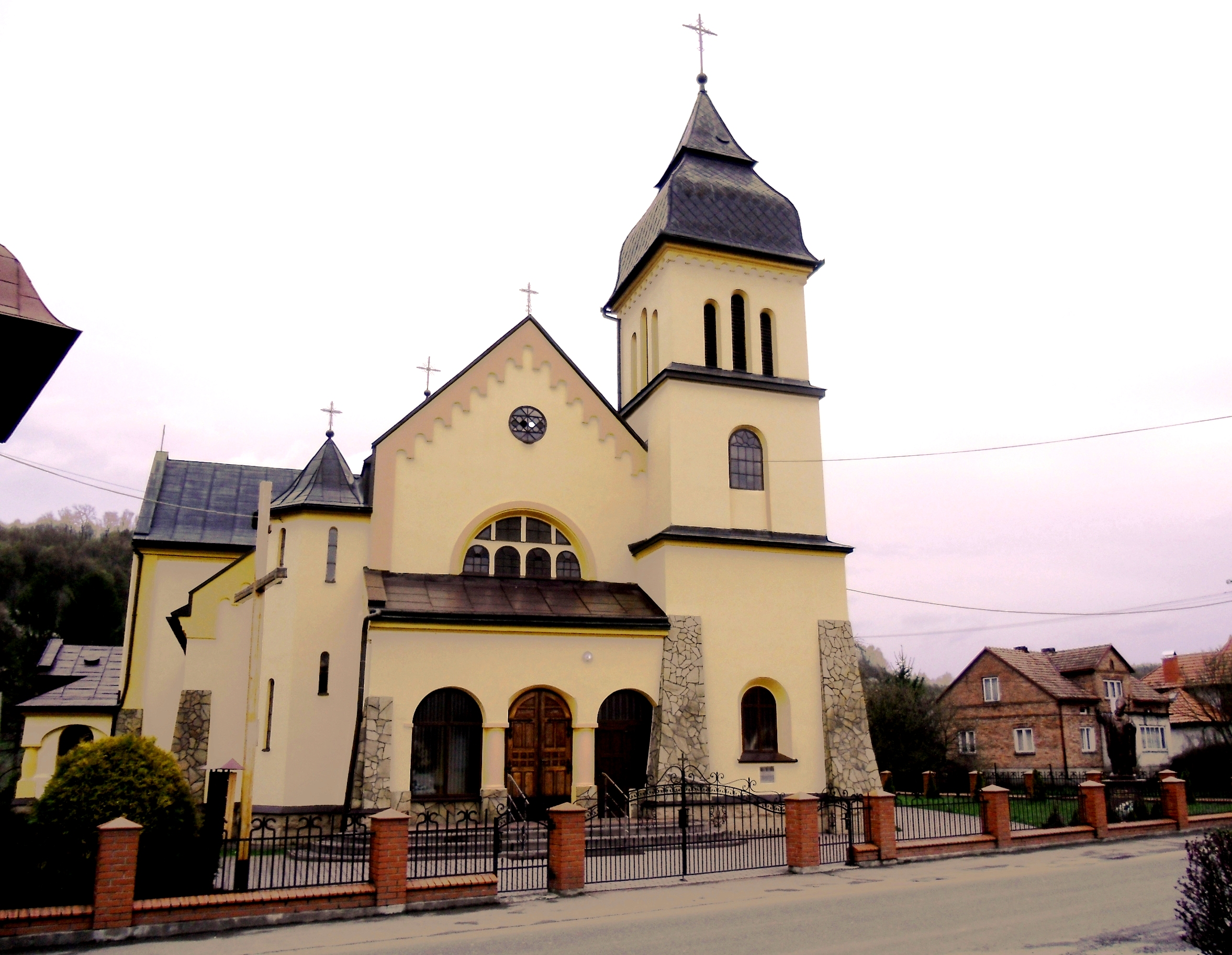
Church of St. Wojciech in Tarnawa Górna

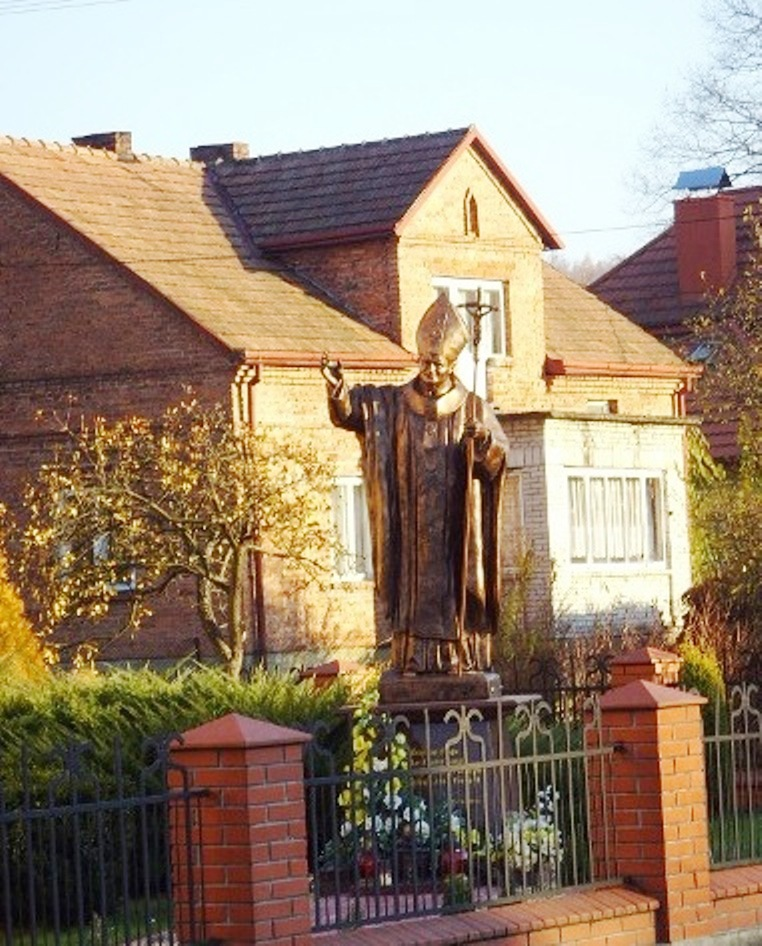
Monument to John Paul II at a church in Tarnawa Górna
