= Prełuki =

Hamlet (former Lemko village) in Poland

Prełuki Прелукы
- Hamlet
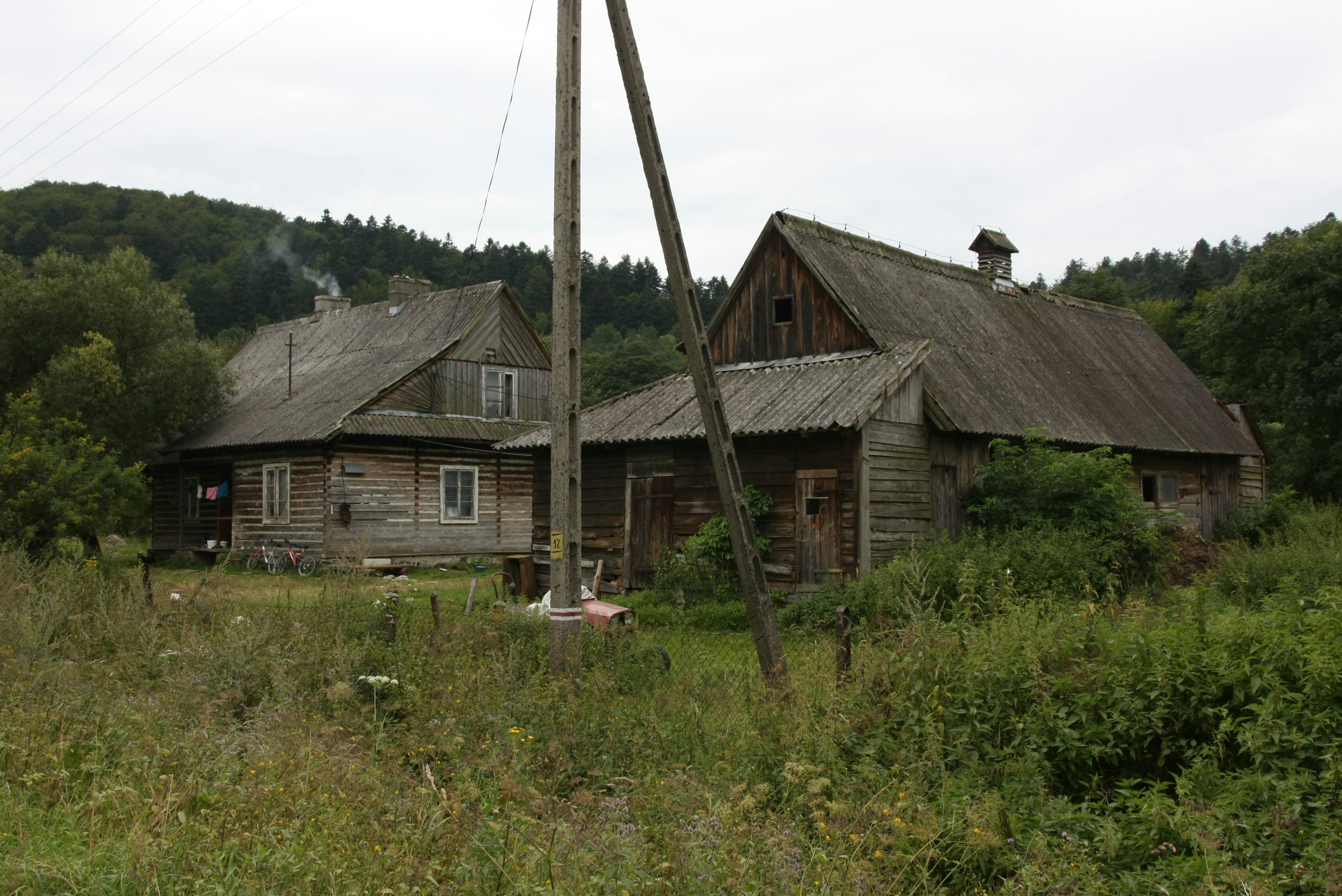
- Wooden chyża and outbuilding in Prełuki

- Location within Poland
- Coordinates: 49°22′N 22°9′E
- Country: Poland
- Voivodeship: Podkarpackie
- County: Sanok
- Gmina: Komańcza
- Sołectwo: Komańcza

Population (2024)
  - Total: 9
- Postal code: 38-542
- Car plates: RSA

Prełuki [prɛˈwukʲi] (Lemko Rusyn: Прелукы, Prelukŷ), formerly known in Polish as Przełęczki or Przełęki (16th century), later Przełęcz (1977–1981), is a hamlet and former village located in the administrative district of Gmina Komańcza, within Sanok County, in the Podkarpackie Voivodeship (province) of south-eastern Poland, close to the border with Slovakia. It is part of the sołectwo (village council) of nearby Komańcza.

The majority population were Lemko Rusyn before World War II and Operation Vistula.

== Location ==
Prełuki is located on the Osława River, a left tributary of the San River, 15 km from the border with Slovakia, 7 km southeast of the gmina's administrative center of Komańcza, 21 km south of the county administrative center of Sanok, and 75 km south of Rzeszów, the administrative center of the Podkarpackie Voivodeship.

The international walking trail "In the footsteps of the Good Soldier Švejk" and the Main Beskid Trail (the section between Komańcza and Duszatyn) both run through the village.

In terms of the physico-geographical regionalization of Poland, the hamlet is located on the border of the Low Beskids with the Western Bieszczady mountains. This also forms the boundary of the Cisna-Wetlina Landscape Park, located immediately to Prełuki's east. The hamlet is also located close to the Osława Gorge Nature Reserve at Duszatyn as well as the Duszatyn Lakes, a well-known attraction in the area.

== Name ==
The settlement's name derives from the Old Polish word Przełęk, meaning "arable field" or "farmland"; in 1557 it is named as Przełęczki, and later as Przełęki, and in 1867 under the Ruthenized name Pryłuki.

During the communist Polish government campaign in 1977 to change names of villages that were once populated by Lemkos, Boykos, and Ukrainians – before resettlements following World War II and under Operation Vistula – the village was renamed Przełęcz, a calque of the Ruthenized name, shifting the meaning to "mountain pass" and the number from plural to singular. However, the original name was duly re-adopted in 1981.

== History ==
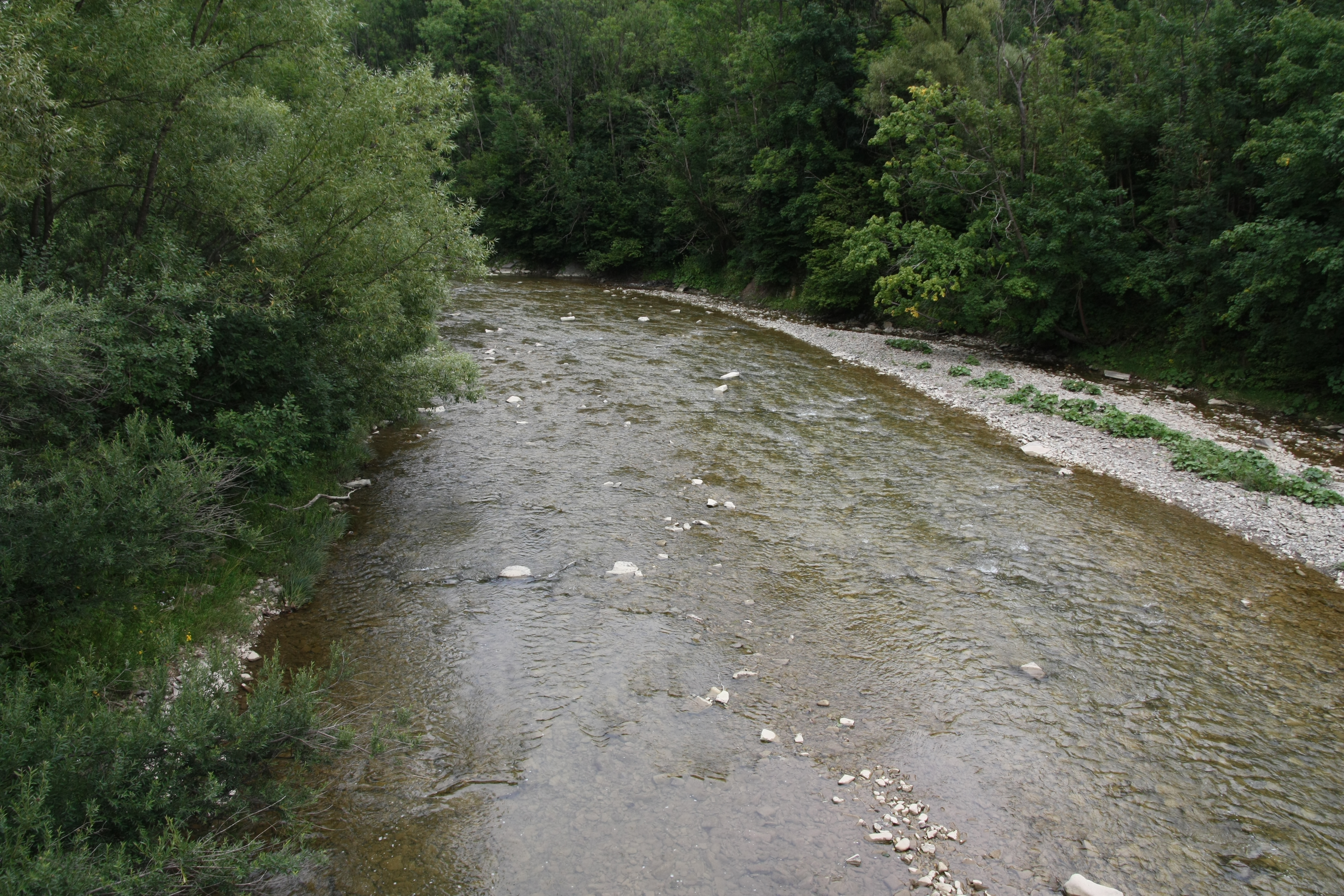
River Osława in Prełuki

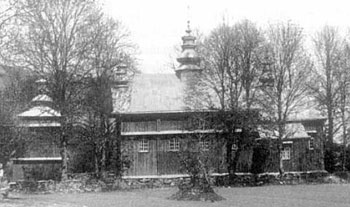
Greek Catholic Church of St. Nicholas in Prełuki, built in 1831, destroyed in 1955

At the beginning of the 15th century, the Vlach migrations took place in the Low Beskids and Eastern Carpathians, and as a result, Balkan pastoralists began to colonize these areas. Sources state that the village was founded in cruda radice (as an undeveloped frontier) in the early 1550s by an Orthodox priest with the surname Zalepka, Zolop, or Tołop; the priest was originally from Hoszów. In 1557, a foundational charter was granted to him by the starosta of Sanok, Sebastian Lubomirski. Four years later, the first settlers moved there. A land survey from 1565 in all royal estates mentioned the settlement and stated that an Eastern Orthodox church existed there. In documents from the years 1551–1600, the village was recorded as being under the Vlach law; the tax register of 1565 lists 12 kmiecie under Vlach law with tax exemption for another 16 years. The village was then located in the Sanok Land of the Ruthenian Voivodeship.

In 1595 or 1596 the Ruthenian Uniate Church was created in the Polish-Lithuanian Commonwealth, with some of the Eastern Orthodox faithful in the village eventually converting under political pressure from the Union of Brest to switch allegiance from Constantinople to the Holy See.

Prełuki was considered royal property until the partition of the Polish-Lithuanian Commonwealth, when it was sold into private hands by the Austrians. From 1782, it was located in the Lisko kreis of the Kingdom of Galicia and Lodomeria, under the Austrian Empire. It was later transferred to the Sanok kreis. In the mid-19th century, the owner of the landed estate of Prełuki was Alfred Lubaczewski.

In 1831, another wooden church, the Greek Catholic Church of St. Nicholas, was built. In 1888, the village had 46 households and 316 inhabitants, and in 1898, the village had 48 households and 356 inhabitants.

A geographical dictionary from 1880 describes the state of Prełuki at that time as follows: "a village in Bezirk Sanok, situated in a mountainous area at an elevation of 453 meters above sea level, on the Osława stream. The Greek Catholic church and some of the cottages lie on the left bank, while the rest are on the right bank of the river. The village territory consists of forested hills. To the southeast of the village lies the Prełuki peak (779 m a.s.l.). This wooded hill is located on the right bank of the Osława, between the Olchowaty stream (to the south) and the Kołodzialny stream (to the north). The forest on the southern side is known as Niwa Turzańska. A triangulation marker is located on a hill.

Several streams flow down into the Osława from the highlands surrounding the village. The largest among them are on the right bank and are named Trawny and Kołodaczny. The village borders Turzańsk to the north, Duszatyn to the south, Kamionki to the east, and Komańcza to the west. The soil is infertile, suitable mainly for oats. Prełuki comprises 46 houses and 316 inhabitants of the Greek Catholic faith — Rusyns. The parish church belongs to the Jaśliska deanery, and the parish encompasses Duszatyn and Piekarki. The parish priest's endowment consists of 16 morgs of farmland and a kongrua supplement of 129 Rhenish guilders. According to Siarczyński (Ossolineum Library manuscript No. 1826), there was once a salt spring here, which was filled in by order of the Austrian government. A wójtostwo (village headman's estate) also existed here which belonged to the Mrzygłód starostwo (administrative district)."

At the turn of the 19th and 20th centuries, the village was in the possession of the Potocki family of Rymanów. In 1905, Józef Mikołaj Potocki held an area of 337 hectares in the village, consisting primarily of forest. In 1911, he held 298 hectares.

Until 1914, Prełuki fell judicially and administratively under the Sanok kreis, Bukowsko bezirk. During World War I, bloody battles were fought in the Prełuki region for the nearby Sokoliska Mountain (now home to a television antenna, nicknamed kogucik; "rooster"), and the dead were buried in the cemetery directly adjacent to the church.

From November 1918 to January 1919, Prełuki along with 33 other villages became part of the Komańcza Republic. The peasants of Prełuki became renowned for their extraordinary ferocity in battles for independence against the Poles. Later, in the interwar Second Polish Republic, the village was part of the Sanok County of the Lwów Voivodeship.

In 1921, there were 56 households and 350 inhabitants, including 337 of Ruthenian nationality, 2 Polish, and 11 Jewish.

Roman Catholic inhabitants were served by the Latin-rite parish in Bukowsko; a school and a Greek Catholic parish church also operated in Prełuki until 1947. The village covered an area of 8.42 km².

In 1923, a narrow-gauge railway running from Rzepedź to Mików reached Prełuki; it was used to transport timber from the surrounding forests, which were then owned by the Potocki family. In 1927, a branch line was built from the Prełuki station, leading up the Kołodzialny stream to a forester's lodge.

=== Church and cemeteries ===
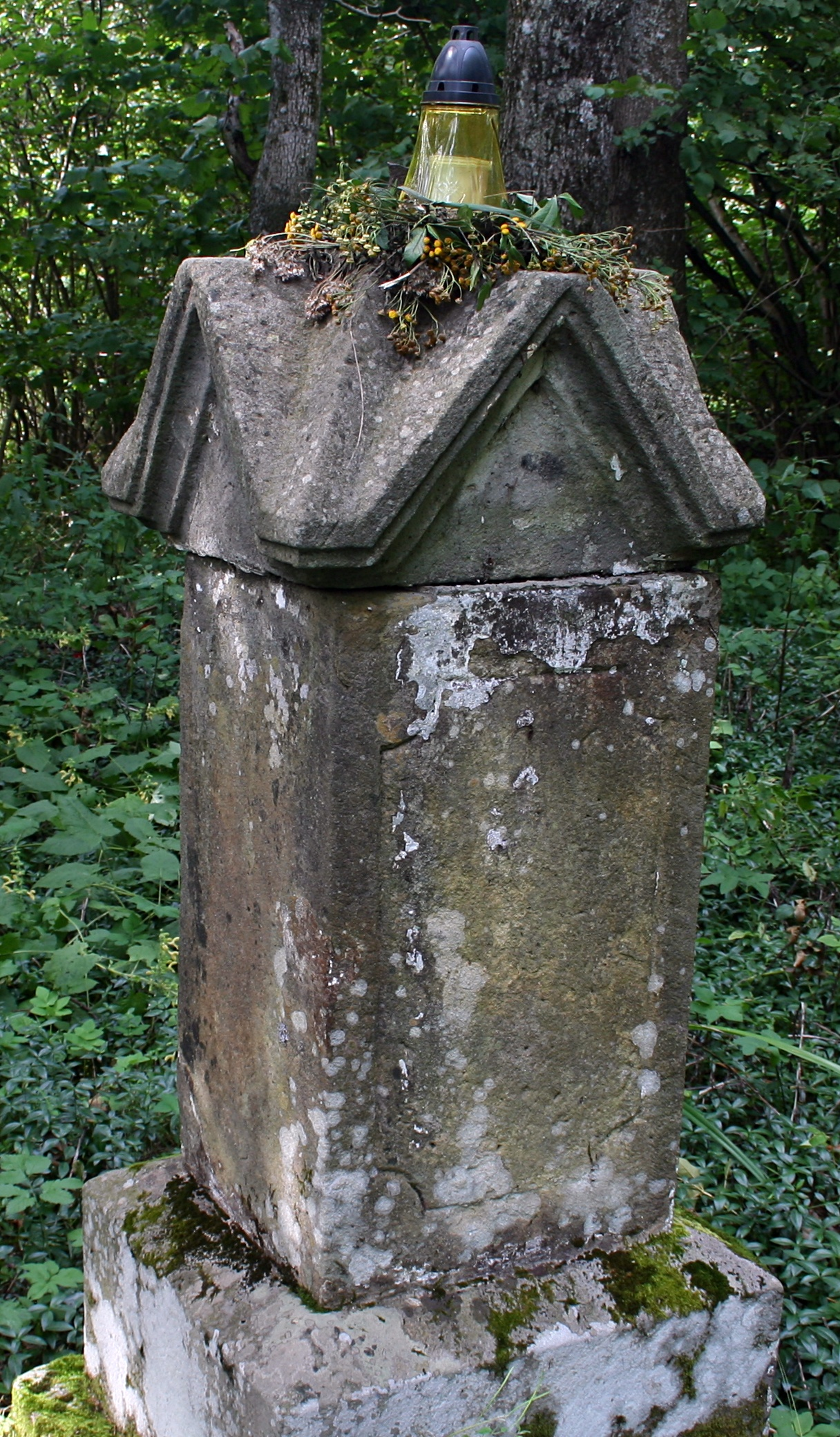
Greek Catholic cemetery in Prełuki

The village church, the second of two that had historically existed there, stood north of the Prełuki-Komańcza road (approximately 200 meters off of the road), on the road to Rzepedź. It was the Church of St. Nicholas, built in 1831, or according to another source, 1842. After renovations in 1900, it was re-consecrated. It was a wooden structure, made of larch wood, set on a low stone foundation. The church had a tin sloped roof which covered the main body of the church (the nave) and the women's compartment (Babinets). A lower sloped roof covered the chancel. The roof was adorned with three turrets, each with an onion dome. The biggest dome was over the nave. On the west side of the church there was a wooden bell tower, designed on a square plan, which had a hip roof with an onion dome. The church site was surrounded by a low stone wall, and within its confines there is a graveyard with a few headstones. This graveyard became the final resting place for those fallen near Prełuki in World War I.

It was a Greek Catholic parish of the Jaśliska deanery of the Przemyśl eparchy, later appearing in records as being a parish of the Łupków deanery along with the nearby smaller village Duszatyn. After World War II, the church was abandoned, and most of the local population was displaced. Soon, the works of sacred art and the altar disappeared. The building fell into disrepair. Until 1955, the church, although devastated inside, still stood in its original location. Shortly thereafter, depending on varying accounts, it was dismantled and used to build houses in nearby villages, a similar practice to what was done with most abandoned villages' wooden houses. The wooden bell tower was also dismantled.

On the opposite side of the road lies another Lemko cemetery, an area enclosed by a stone wall. Two tombstones and numerous traces of earthen graves have survived there. A third cemetery, though completely overgrown and illegible, lies further west across the tracks and in the woods, near a visible meadow (100 m away). This area was historically known as "Łuh" (meaning "meadow").

=== Resettlement ===
After World War II, some of the inhabitants of Prełuki were forcefully resettled to the USSR, despite numerous requests and petitions sent to the authorities (including one dated September 15, 1945). The residents demanded to remain in their place of residence, emphasizing their contribution to the liberation of Polish lands, when they had been recruited into many partisan units fighting against the Germans. At the same time, they referred to themselves as "Rusyns," distancing themselves from Ukrainians, condemning the massacres of Polish civilians by Ukrainians in Eastern Galicia.

At the request of the Rzeszów Voivode, the petition was rejected. Those who avoided displacement immediately after the war were resettled later to the Recovered Territories, as part of Operation Vistula in 1947. Most of the houses were demolished. Some were destroyed, others were sold – at that time, it was possible to purchase a house demolished after the expulsion and transport and rebuild it in another village.

=== Current state ===
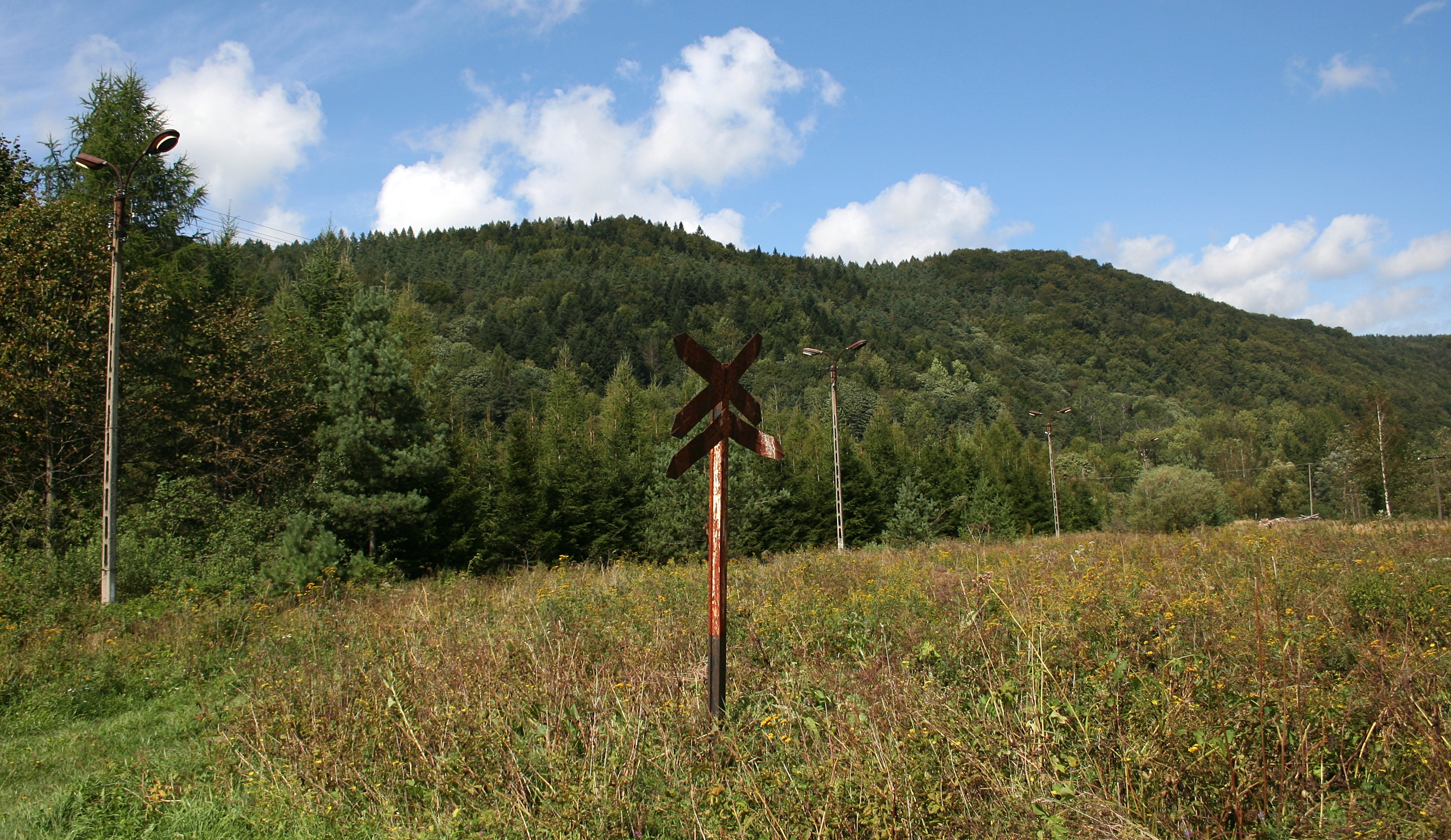
Disused railway line in Prełuki

The village once had a railway station named Prełuki, on the now-disused narrow-gauge foresters' railway which ran through the area (the Rzepedź–Mików section). The railway station was reduced to a dilapidated ruin before being dismantled, and the tracks have since become overgrown with weeds and grass; however, it has since been considered to reopen this section of the railway.

Today, only a few wooden buildings remain, mostly outbuildings.

In August 2017, signs marking the conventional boundary between the Eastern and Western Carpathians were installed on both sides of the Osława River bridge. These were created for tourism purposes; the actual geographical boundary does not run through this spot, it is rather the boundary of the Cisna-Wetlina Landscape Park and the Low Beskids with the Bieszczady Mountains. The next year, an informational plaque which contains a faux wooden window prop ("In the heart of the Carpathians") inspired by pre-war Lemko houses was installed, which may be opened and closed. It was installed by the Podkarpackie Voivodeship in Interreg partnership with the nearby Slovak town of Svidník.

The site of the former church and cemeteries are also worthy of note. A forest road permitted for public use which connects Komańcza with the Duszatyn lakes runs through Prełuki, allowing access by car. However, a perpendicular road is only used by the forestry service and permitted for pedestrians or cyclists. Another point of interest in Prełuki is a small hydrogen sulfide spring (though such springs are not particularly rare in this region). It is located right next to the railway tracks, by marker post 4.4, in the direction of Duszatyn. Near the bridge over the Osława River, there is a small campsite; once in use, it is now practically abandoned and no longer operational since the 1990s.

Another point of interest consists of three pre-war stone wayside crosses standing by an old village road. This road is located north of the settlement, at the mouth of the Kołodzialny Stream valley. A forest track leads to this spot, running along the right bank of the river and into the depths of the stream's valley. The stone pole of a former railway spur bridge has also been preserved here.

The area of Prełuki is considered a zone of brown bear and viper activity, and appropriate signage from the local forestry warns tourists of this.
