= Gmina Zagórz =

Gmina Zagórz Zagórz Commune
- Gmina
- Coat of arms
- Interactive map of Gmina Zagórz
- Coordinates (Zagórz): 49°31′N 22°16′E
- Country: Poland
- Voivodeship: Subcarpathian
- County: Sanok
- Seat: Zagórz

Area
  - Total: 161.48 km^{2} (62.35 sq mi)

Population (2006)
  - Total: 12,725
  - Density: 78.802/km^{2} (204.10/sq mi)
  - Urban: 4,990
  - Rural: 7,735
- Website: http://www.zagorz.pl

Gmina Zagórz is an urban-rural gmina (administrative district) in Sanok County, Subcarpathian Voivodeship, in south-eastern Poland. Its seat is the town of Zagórz, which lies approximately 6 kilometres (4 mi) south-east of Sanok and 61 km (38 mi) south of the regional capital Rzeszów.

The gmina covers an area of 160.05 square kilometres (61.8 sq mi), and as of 2006 its total population is 12,725 (out of which the population of Zagórz amounts to 4,990, and the population of the rural part of the gmina is 7,735). Ethnically the population of the region includes Poles and Pogorzans.

The gmina contains part of the protected area called Cisna-Wetlina Landscape Park.

== Villages ==
Apart from the town of Zagórz, Gmina Zagórz contains the villages and settlements of Brzozowiec, Czaszyn, Kalnica, Łukowe, Mokre, Morochów, Olchowa, Poraż, Średnie Wielkie, Tarnawa Dolna, Tarnawa Górna and Zahutyń.

== Neighbouring gminas ==
Gmina Zagórz is bordered by the town of Sanok and by the gminas of Baligród, Bukowsko, Komańcza, Lesko and Sanok.
