= Zagórz =

Town in Subcarpathian Voivodeship, Poland

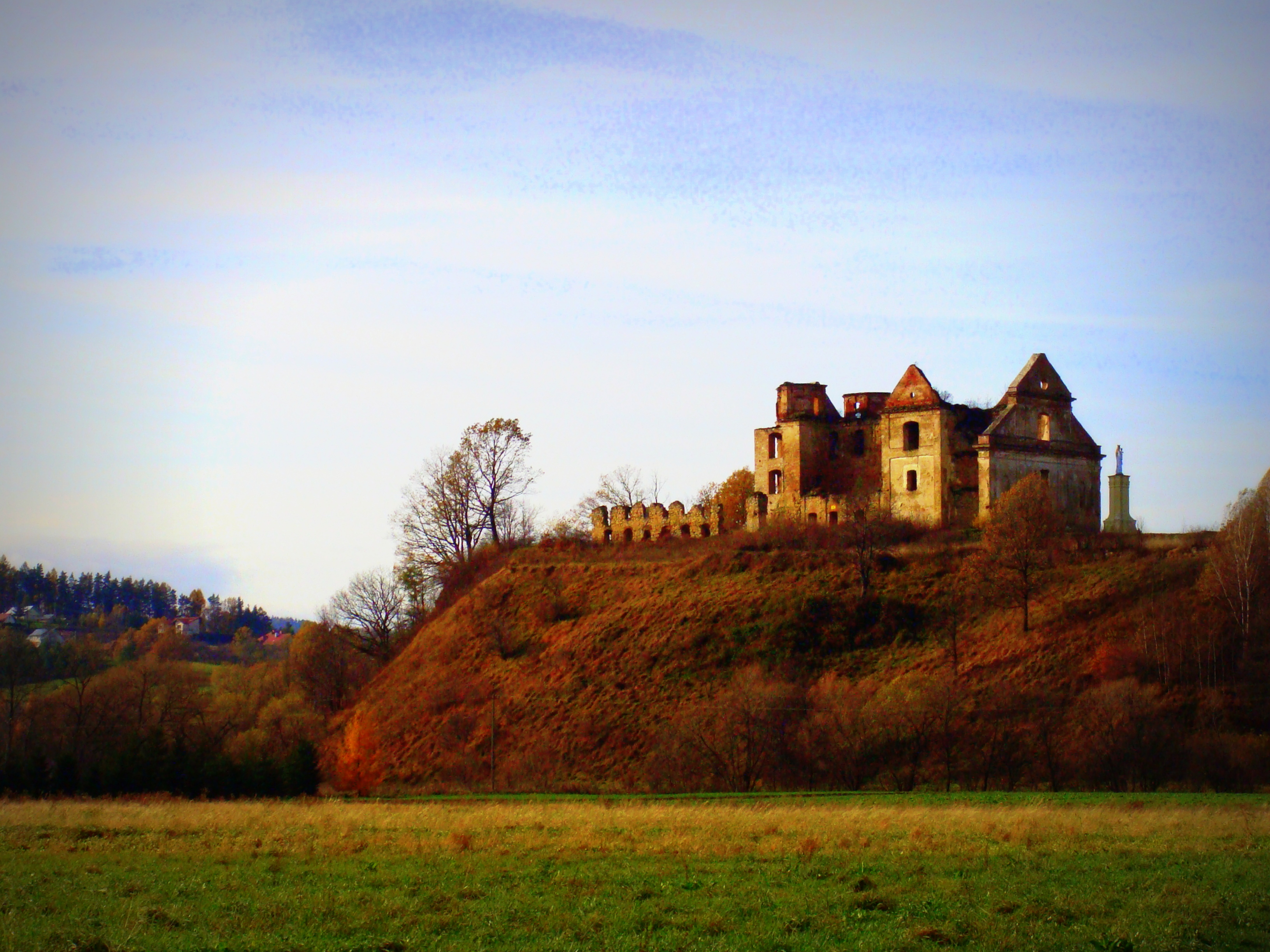
- View of the ruined monastery at Mariemont Hill that overlooks the town

- Coat of arms

- Location within Poland
- Coordinates: 49°31′N 22°16′E
- Country: Poland
- Voivodeship: Subcarpathian
- County: Sanok
- Gmina: Zagórz
- Established: 14th century
- Town rights: 1977

Government
  - Mayor: Ernest Nowak

Area
  - Total: 22.39 km^{2} (8.64 sq mi)

Population (2006)
  - Total: 4,990
  - Density: 223/km^{2} (577/sq mi)
- Time zone: UTC+1 (CET)
  - Summer (DST): UTC+2 (CEST)
- Postal code: 38-540
- Area code: +48 13
- Car plates: RSA
- Website: http://www.zagorz.pl

Zagórz [ˈzaɡuʂ] (Note: Ukrainian: Загі́р'я; German: Sagor) is a town in Sanok County, Subcarpathian Voivodeship, in south-eastern Poland, on the river Osława in the Bukowsko Upland mountains, located 6.5 kilometres (4.0 mi) south-east of Sanok on the way to Ustrzyki Dolne, 32.4 kilometres (20.1 mi) distance. Zagórz has a population of 4,988 (02.06.2009).

Zagórz is the most southeasterly railroad junction of the PKP, with lines going into three directions - eastwards (to Krościenko and Ukrainian border), southwards (to Nowy Łupków and Slovak border) and westwards (to Jasło and the rest of the country).

== History ==
The village of Zagórz was established in the 14th century. In early 16th-century documents, its name was spelled Sagorsze and Sogorsch. Zagórz belonged to the noble Tarnawski family, but in 1490, the village was sold to Piotr Kmita Sobieński. In the 16th and 17th centuries, Zagórz frequently changed owners.

In 1710, Voivode of Volhynia, Count Jan Adam Stadnicki built in Zagórz a fortified Carmelite monastery, which also served as a hospital for war veterans. The complex served as a hideout for rebels of the Bar Confederation. In 1772, Zagórz was annexed by Austria in the First Partition of Poland, and became part of Galicia. In 1789, the abbey was closed by Joseph II. In 1831, the complex burned in a fire.

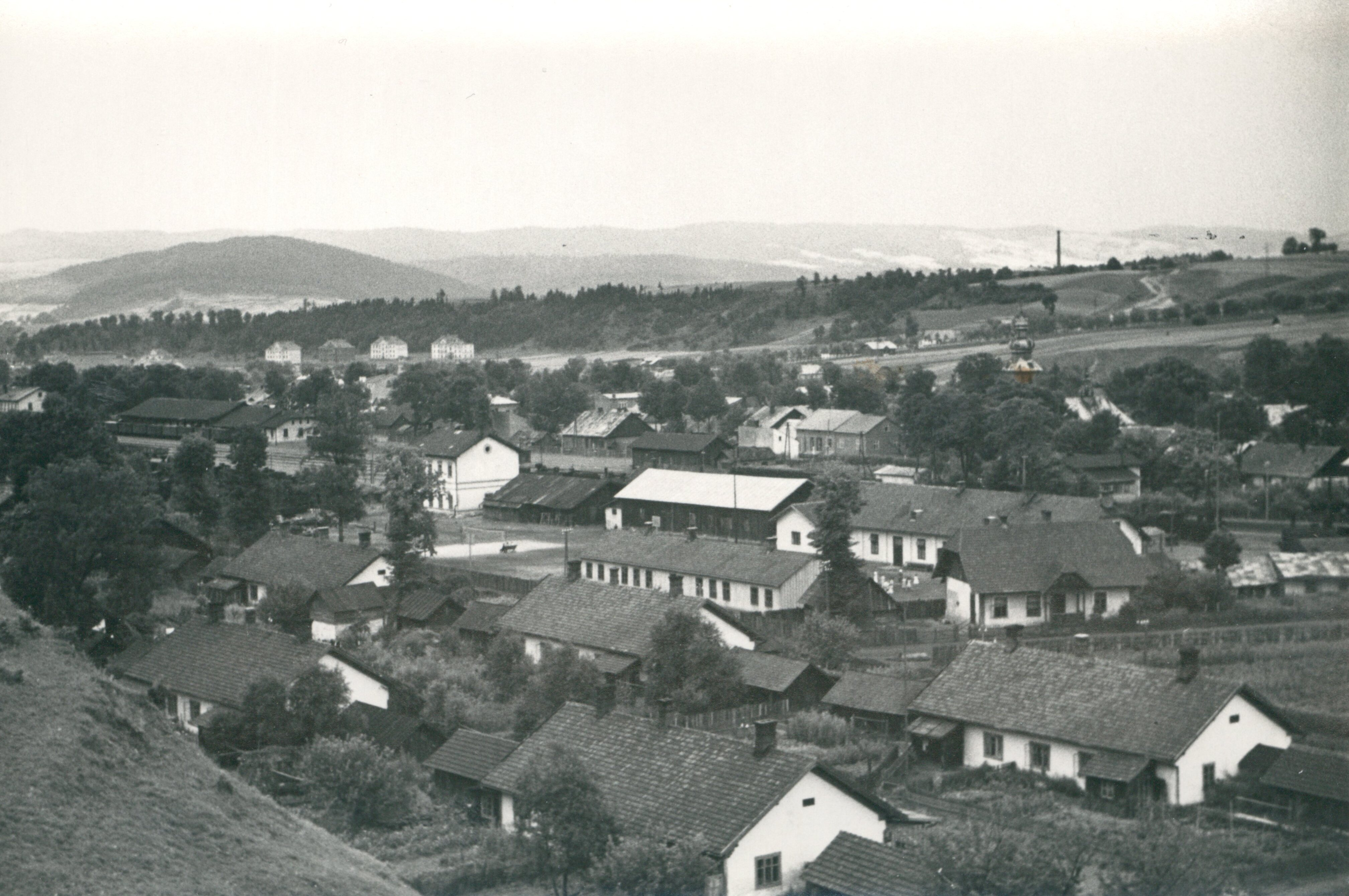
Zagórz, before 1936

In 1880, the population of Zagórz was 1,639, including Poles, "Rusyny" (Ukrainians), Jews and Germans. By that time, Zagórz already had a rail station, located in the district of Nowy Zagórz. The establishment of a rail junction contributed to the development of the village, whose population grew to 2,400 by 1914. During the Polish–Ukrainian War (1918-1919), local rail workers built the armoured train Gromobój, which protected the area from Ukrainian raids. In the Second Polish Republic, Zagórz belonged to Lwów Voivodeship.

During the invasion of Poland at the start of World War II, the first Wehrmacht units entered the village on 12 September 1939. The Polish resistance was active in the area, including a local unit of the Home Army. On 17 September 1943, the Home Army successfully raided a German police station in Zagórz. During the war, the Zasław district of Zagórz was the location of the Zasław concentration camp set up by Nazi Germany for the concentration and exploitation of Polish Jews soon to be exterminated in Belzec. German occupation ended on September 13, 1944, when the Red Army entered Zagórz.

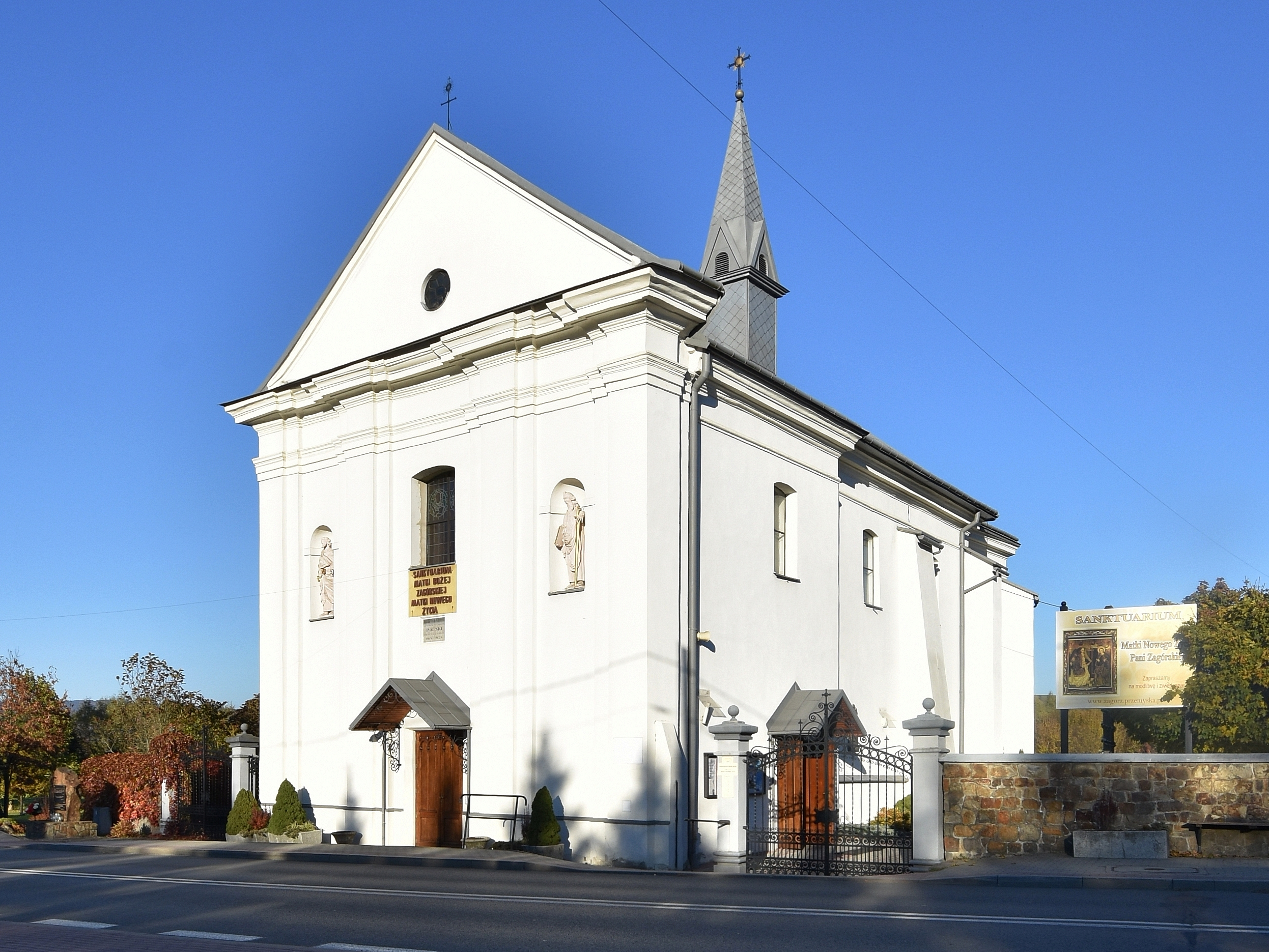
Church of the Assumption

== Bibliography ==
- Prof. Adam Fastnacht. Slownik Historyczno-Geograficzny Ziemi Sanockiej w Średniowieczu (Historic-Geographic Dictionary of the Sanok District in the Middle Ages), Kraków, 2002, ISBN 83-88385-14-3.
