= Poraż =

- Village
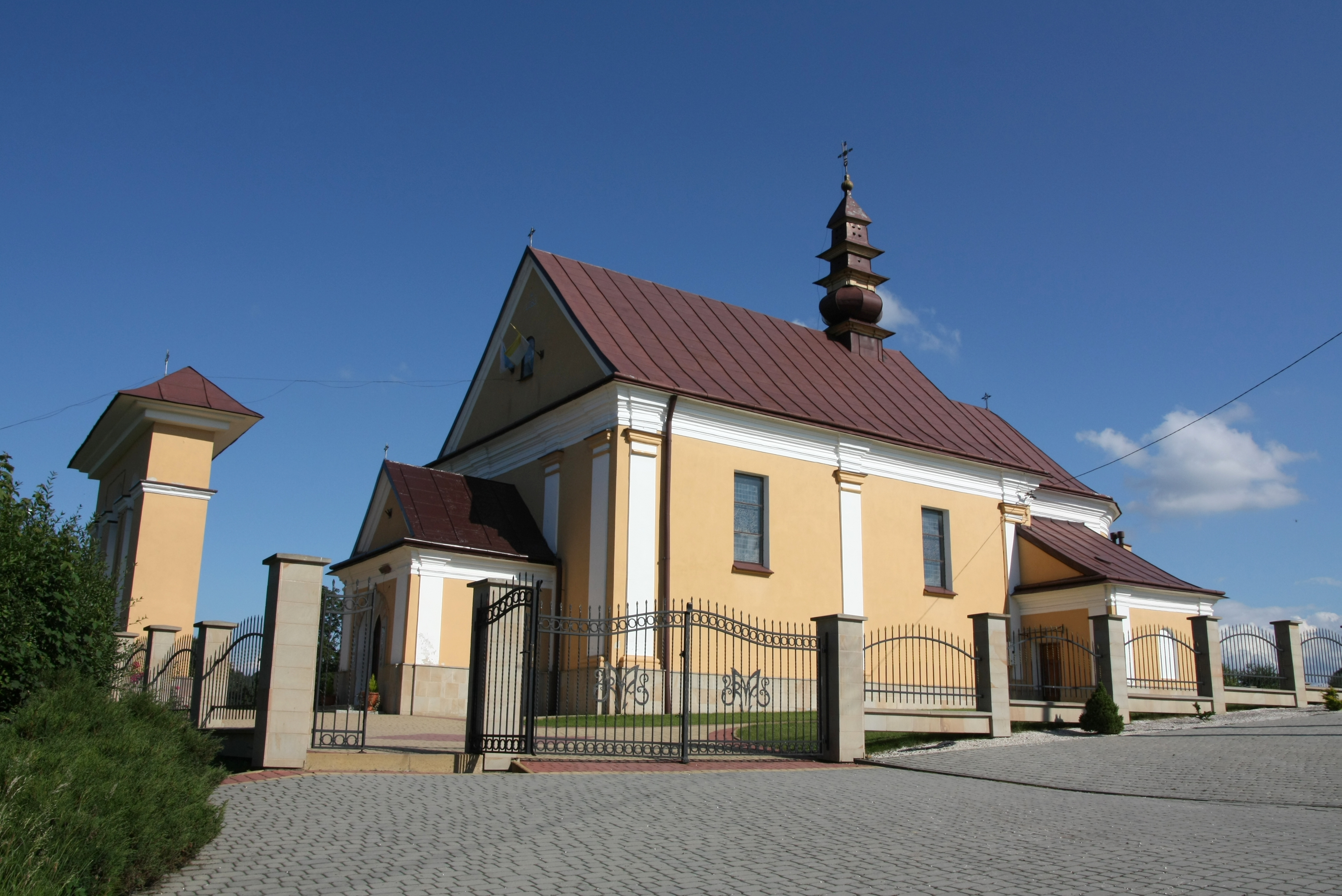
- Church of the Virgin Mary

- Location within Poland
- Coordinates: 49°29′N 22°14′E
- Country: Poland
- Voivodeship: Subcarpathian
- County: Sanok
- Gmina: Zagórz

Population
  - Total: 1,400

Poraż [ˈpɔraʂ] is a village in the administrative district of Gmina Zagórz, within Sanok County, Subcarpathian Voivodeship, in south-eastern Poland.
