= Tarnawa Dolna, Podkarpackie Voivodeship =

Tarnawa Dolna
- Village
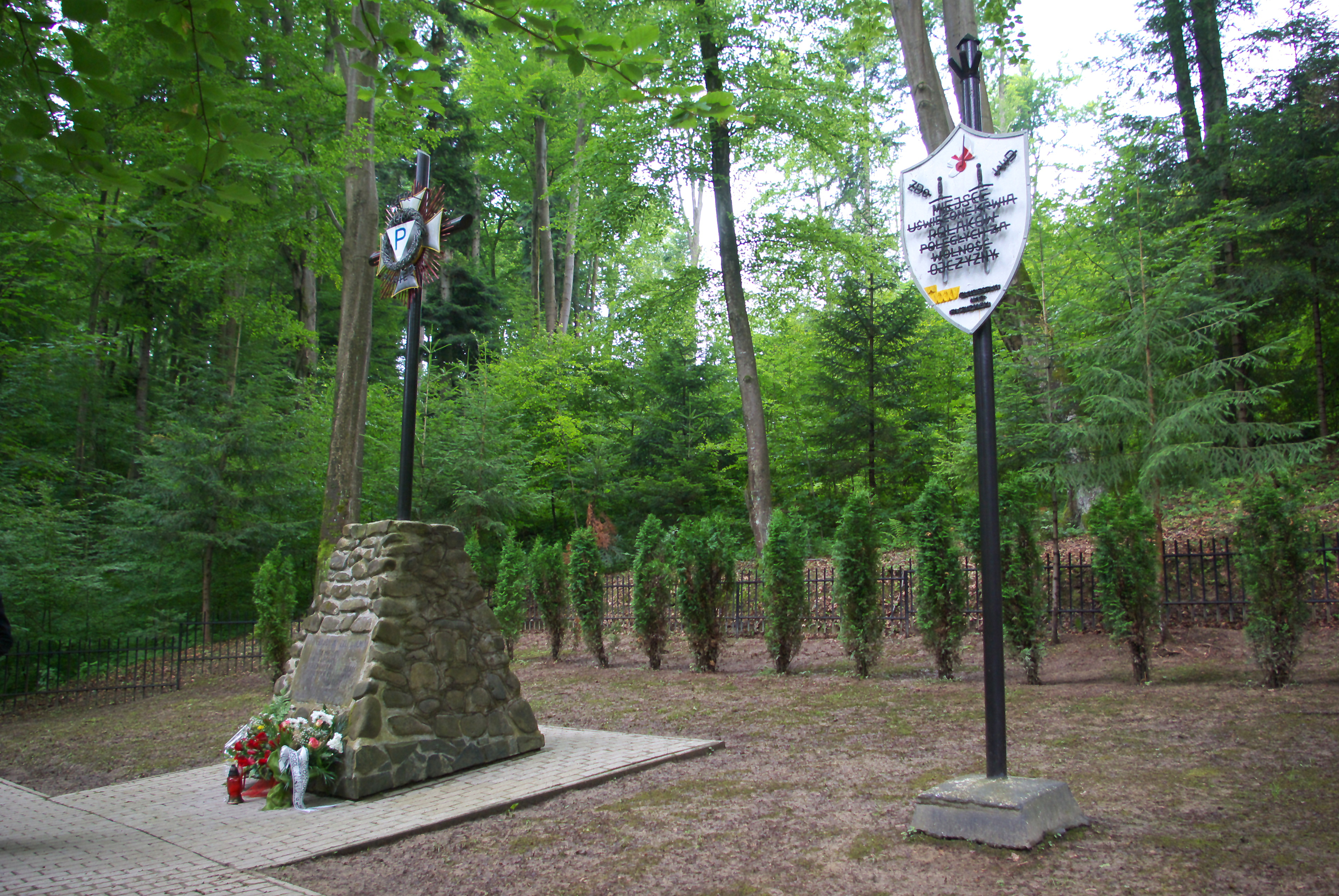
- Memorial at the site of the German massacre of Poles committed during World War II

- Location within Poland
- Coordinates: 49°28′28″N 22°15′23″E
- Country: Poland
- Voivodeship: Subcarpathian
- County: Sanok
- Gmina: Zagórz
- Population: 940
- Time zone: UTC+1 (CET)
  - Summer (DST): UTC+2 (CEST)
- Vehicle registration: RSA

Tarnawa Dolna is a village in the administrative district of Gmina Zagórz, within Sanok County, Subcarpathian Voivodeship, in south-eastern Poland.

== History ==
During the German occupation (World War II), the Gruszka mountain near Tarnawa Dolna was the site of a German massacre of 112 Poles, who were previously imprisoned in nearby Sanok after trying to escape the Germans to take refuge in Hungary (see also: Nazi crimes against the Polish nation).

== Notable people ==
- Władysław Kudlik (1922–1946), member of the Polish resistance movement in World War II
- Rudolf Poliniewicz (1925–1946), Polish anti-communist partisan and former forced labourer under Germany
