= Zahutyń =

- Village
- Location within Poland
- Coordinates: 49°32′N 22°15′E
- Country: Poland
- Voivodeship: Subcarpathian
- County: Sanok
- Gmina: Zagórz

Zahutyń [zaˈxutɨɲ] is a village in the administrative district of Gmina Zagórz, within Sanok County, Subcarpathian Voivodeship, in south-eastern Poland.
