= Duszatyn =

- Village
- Location within Poland
- Coordinates: 49°19′N 22°8′E
- Country: Poland
- Voivodeship: Subcarpathian
- County: Sanok
- Gmina: Komańcza

Duszatyn [duˈʂatɨn] is a village in the administrative district of Gmina Komańcza, within Sanok County, in the Subcarpathian Voivodeship (province) of south-eastern Poland, close to the border with Slovakia.

== See also ==
- Komancza Republic (November 1918 – January 1919)
