= Komańcza =

Lemko village in Poland

Komańcza Команьча
- village
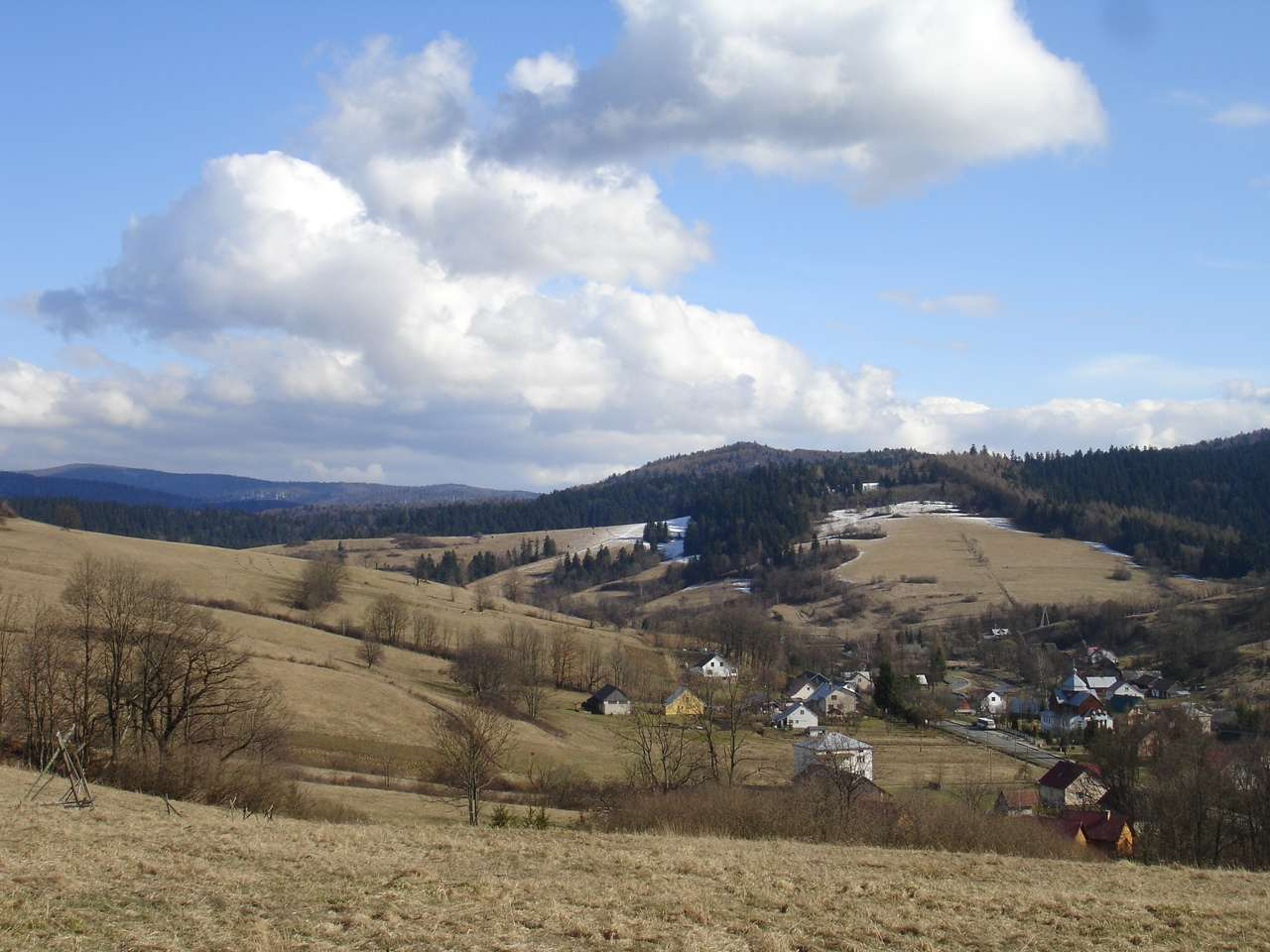
- Interactive map of Komańcza
- Location within Poland
- Coordinates: 49°21′10″N 22°4′30″E
- Country: Poland
- Voivodeship: Subcarpathian
- County: Sanok
- Municipality: Komańcza
- First mentioned: 1512

Area
  - Total: 8.8 km^{2} (3.4 sq mi)
- Elevation: 482 m (1,581 ft)

Population (2002/12/31)
  - Total: 880
  - Density: 100/km^{2} (260/sq mi)
- Time zone: UTC+1 (CET)
  - Summer (DST): UTC+2 (CEST)
- Postal code: 38 543
- Area code: +48 13
- Vehicle registration: KUS, RSA
- Commons: Pogórze Bukowskie
- Website: www.komancza.pl

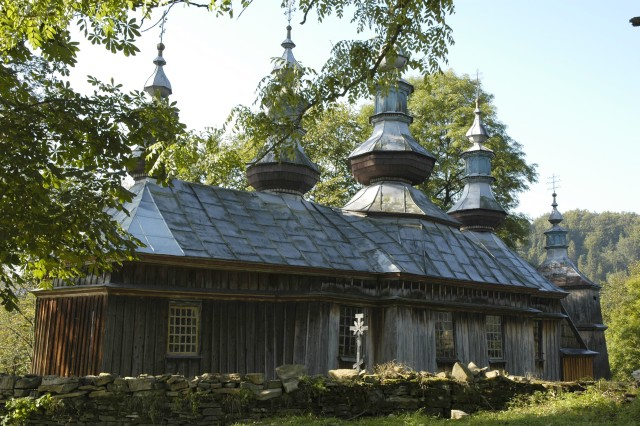
Church before the fire

Komańcza [kɔˈmaɲt͡ʂa] is a village in the Sanok County, in the Subcarpathian Voivodeship (province) of south-eastern Poland. It is situated in the Bukowsko Upland mountains, located near the towns of Medzilaborce and Palota (in northeastern Slovakia).

== Etymology ==
According to some sources its name comes from the east Slavic dialect word Kuman (кумани), meaning "village of Cumans".

== History ==
The village was first mentioned in historical records in 1512 as Crziemyenna, and in 1524 as Komancza. In 1785, the village lands comprised 8.93 km^{2} (3.45 sq mi), with a population of 450 Greek Catholics, 16 Roman Catholics, and 15 Jews. After World War I, the village was the site of the ephemeral Komancza Republic (November 1918 – January 1919). In 1936, the Greek Catholic population increased to 878. In 1945 the Ukrainian parish priest, Orest Wehrynowycz, was murdered by the Poles, and in 1946 the village was burned down, when many local citizens were forcibly deported to the Ukrainian Soviet Socialist Republic. Others were removed from Komańcza on 29 April 1947 as part of Operation Vistula and resettled in the Silesian area of Poland.

== Culture and religion ==
The wooden village church, Patronage of the Blessed Virgin Mary, is considered a pearl of Eastern Lemko architecture. It was built in 1802, and was on the Polish Register of Historic Buildings. The church was occupied by the Greek Catholics until 1963, when it was taken over by the Orthodox. Uniate (Greek Catholic) services were then held in a Roman Catholic Chapel, until a new Uniate church was built in 1987. The old wooden church was totally destroyed by fire on 13 September 2006, but the belfry is still standing. A number of liturgical books, dated from 1638 to 1793, were also severely damaged or destroyed in the fire.

Filial churches are located in Czystohorb (3 km or 1.9 mi away) and Dołżyca (4 km or 2.5 mi).

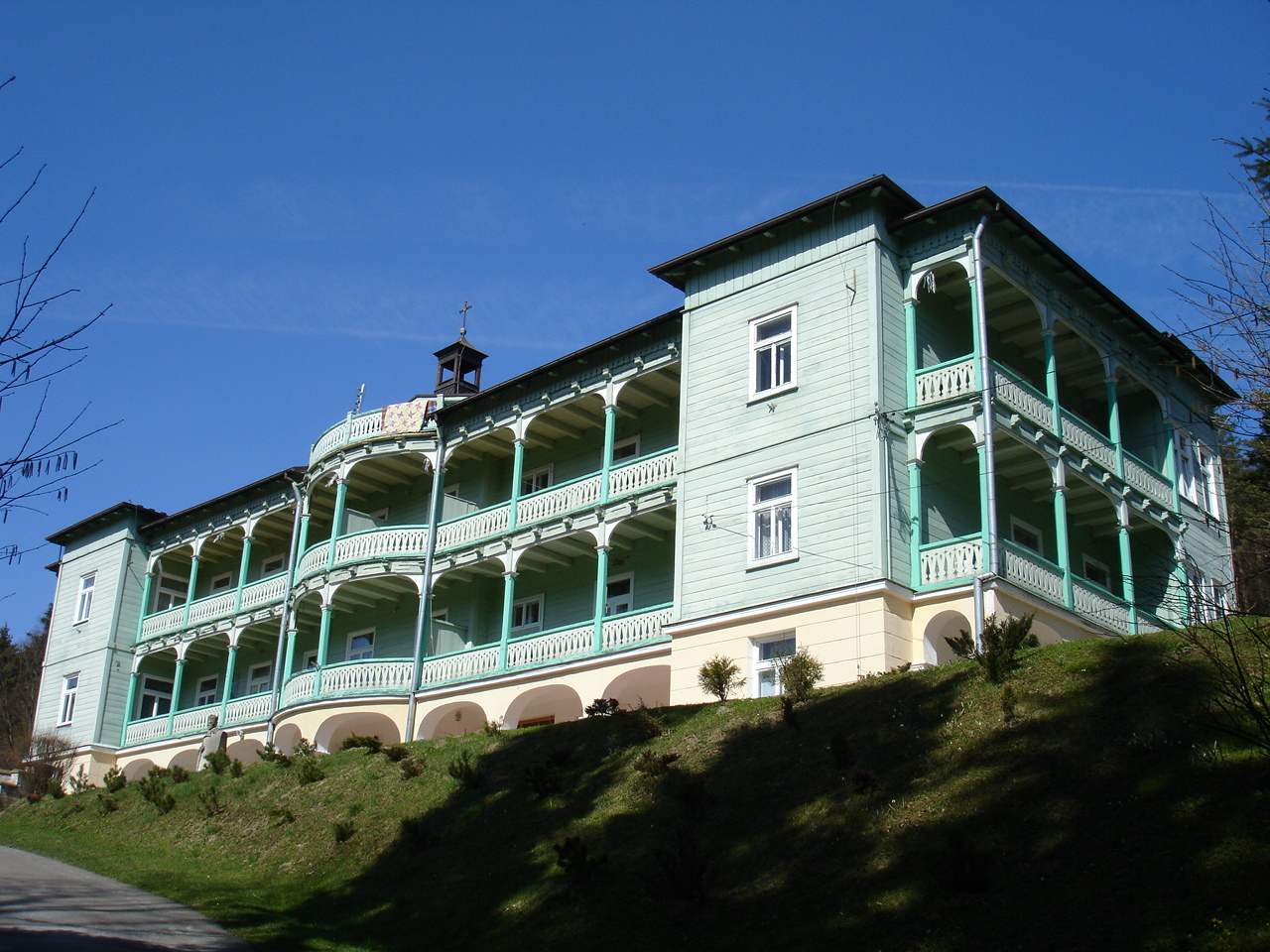
The Monastery of the Sisters of the Holy Family of Nazareth in Komańcza

=== Hiking trail ===
- European walking route E8
  - Prešov - Miháľov - Kurimka - Dukla - Iwonicz-Zdrój – Rymanów-Zdrój - Puławy – Tokarnia (778 m or 2,552 ft) – Kamień (717 m or 2,352 ft) – Komańcza - Cisna - Ustrzyki Górne - Tarnica - Wołosate.

== See also ==
- Pogorzans
- Lemkos
