= Stefan Wyszyński =

Polish Roman Catholic cardinal (1901–1981)

Blessed Stefan Wyszyński
- Cardinal; Archbishop of Gniezno; Archbishop of Warsaw; Primate of Poland
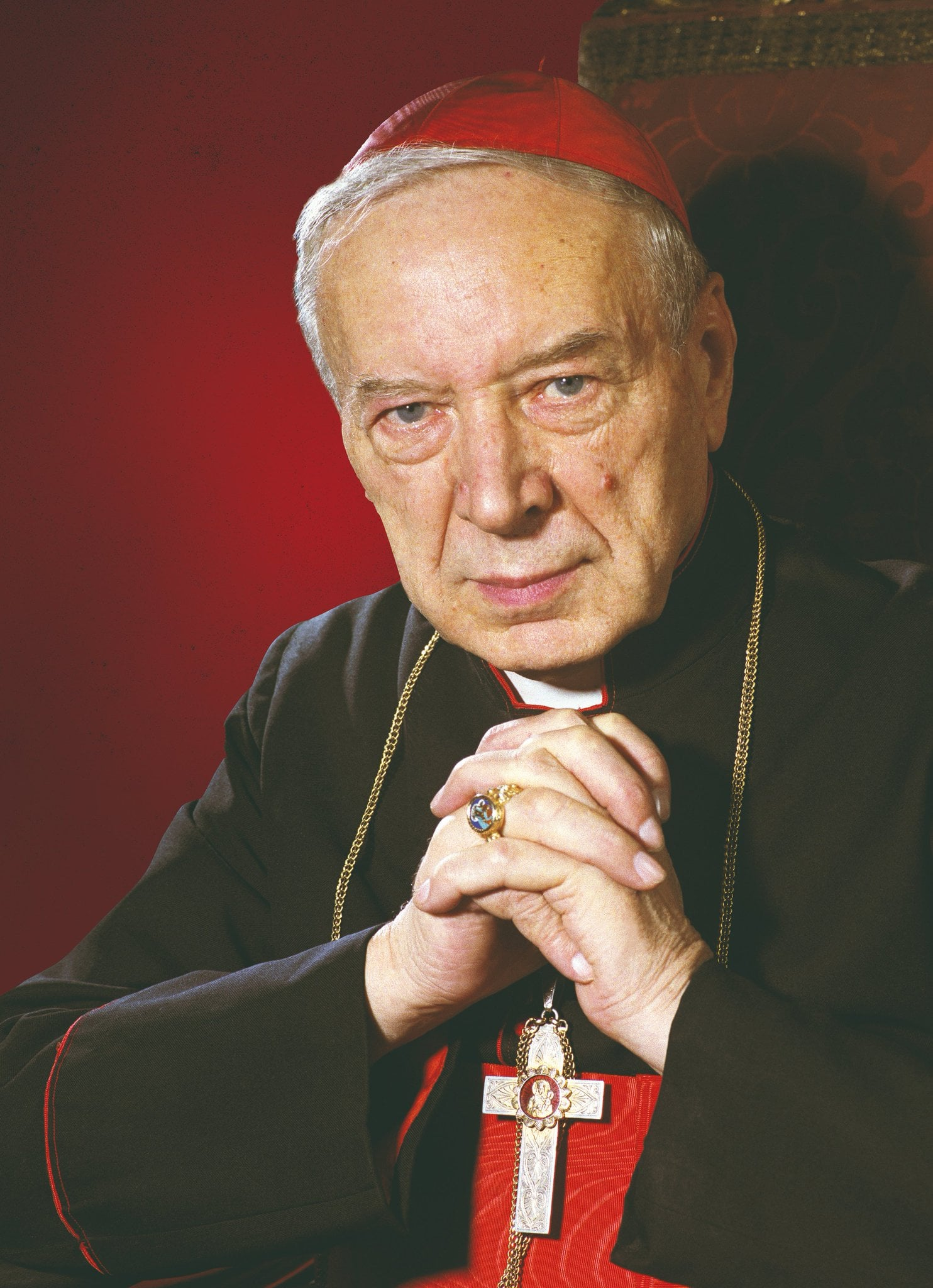
- Church: Catholic Church
- Appointed: 12 November 1948
- Installed: 2 February 1949 (Gniezno); 6 February 1949 (Warsaw)
- Term ended: 28 May 1981
- Predecessor: August Hlond
- Successor: Józef Glemp
- Other posts: Apostolic Administrator of Lviv of the Armenians (1954-81); President of the Polish Episcopal Conference (1956-81); Cardinal-Priest of Santa Maria in Trastevere (1957–81)
- Previous posts: Bishop of Lublin (1946–48); President of the Polish Episcopal Conference (1948-53)

Orders
- Ordination: 3 August 1924 by Wojciech Stanisław Owczarek
- Consecration: 12 May 1946 by August Hlond
- Created cardinal: 12 January 1953 by Pope Pius XII
- Rank: Cardinal-Priest

Personal details
- Born: Stefan Wyszyński; 3 August 1901 Zuzela, Congress Poland, Russian Empire
- Died: 28 May 1981 (aged 79) Warsaw, Poland
- Buried: Saint John's Archcathedral
- Motto: Soli Deo ("To God alone")
- Signature: Stefan Wyszyński's signature

- Coat of arms: Stefan Wyszyński's coat of arms

Sainthood
- Feast day: 28 May
- Venerated in: Catholic Church
- Beatified: 12 September 2021; Temple of Divine Providence, Wilanów, Warsaw, Poland by Cardinal Marcello Semeraro on behalf of Pope Francis
- Attributes: Cardinal's attire
- Patronage: Civitas Christiana; Persecuted Christians

Styles of Stefan Wyszyński
- Reference style: His Eminence
- Spoken style: Your Eminence
- Posthumous style: Blessed
- Informal style: Cardinal
- See: Warsaw

Stefan Wyszyński (Polish pronunciation: [ˈstɛfan vɨˈʂɨj̃skʲi]; 3 August 1901 – 28 May 1981) was a Polish Roman Catholic prelate who served as Archbishop of Warsaw and Archbishop of Gniezno from 1948 to 1981. He previously served as Bishop of Lublin from 1946 to 1948. He was created a cardinal on 12 January 1953 by Pope Pius XII. As Archbishop of Gniezno, Wyszyński possessed the title "Primate of Poland".

The case for Wyszyński's canonization was opened in 1989. He is well known for his stands against both Nazism and Communism, and because of his connections to Pope John Paul II; he played a key role in urging Wojtyła to accept being elected as pope. Pope Francis beatified Wyszyński on 12 September 2021.

Wyszyński was the spiritual leader of the Polish nation, credited with the survival of Polish Christianity in the face of repression and persecution during the Communist regime, especially in the Stalinist period from 1947 to 1956. He himself was imprisoned for three years, and is held by some as one of Poland's national heroes.

== Early life and ordination ==
Wyszyński was born in the village of Zuzela in eastern Mazovia on the Bug River. During the Partitions of Poland, this area was part of the Russian Empire (more specifically, Congress Poland) until the end of the First World War. The Wyszyński family counted itself among the nobility of Poland (the szlachta), with the coat of arms of Trzywdar and the title of baron, although it was not materially well off.

Wyszyński's mother died when he was nine. In 1912, his father sent him to Warsaw. In the years 1914–1916 Stefan attended the high-school in Łomża. The following year he enrolled in the seminary in Włocławek, and on his 23rd birthday (3 August 1924), after being hospitalised with a serious illness, he received his priestly ordination from Bishop Wojciech Stanisław Owczarek.

== Priest and professor ==
Wyszyński celebrated his first Solemn High Mass of Thanksgiving, at Jasna Góra in Częstochowa, a place of special spiritual significance for many Catholic Poles. The Pauline monastery there holds the icon of the Black Madonna, or Our Lady of Częstochowa, the patron saint and guardian of Poland. Wyszyński spent the next four years in Lublin, where in 1929 he received a doctorate at the Faculty of Canon Law and the Social Sciences of the Catholic University of Lublin. His dissertation in Canon Law was entitled The Rights of the Family, Church and State to Schools. For several years after graduation he traveled throughout Europe, where he furthered his education.

After returning to Poland, Wyszyński began teaching at the seminary in Włocławek. When the Second World War broke out with the German invasion of Poland in 1939, he was forced to leave Włocławek because he was wanted by the Gestapo: he had written articles critical of the Nazis in a Catholic journal. At the request of Bishop Kozal, he went to Laski near Warsaw. When the Warsaw Uprising broke out on 1 August 1944, he adopted the nom de guerre "Radwan II" and became chaplain of the insurgents' hospital in Laski, and of the Żoliborz military district of the Armia Krajowa, the Polish underground resistance organisation.

During the Nazi occupation of Poland, Wyszyński aided several Jews. In autumn 1941, the future cardinal took shelter from the Gestapo at the Żułów estate, run by Franciscan nuns. While there, he and another man helped hide a widowed Jewish labourer and his two children – who would be denounced by a Ukrainian nationalist and killed by the Germans in October/November 1942, five months after the liquidation of the local ghetto in Kraśniczyn – in an attic. Additionally, Esther Grinberg, in her testimony held at the Yad Vashem Institute in Jerusalem, credits the Polish assistance that saved her life to Wyszyński's veiled injunction, possibly in a sermon, to rescue "those running from the fire".

In 1945, a year after the end of war in the area, Wyszyński returned to Włocławek, where he started a restoration project for the devastated seminary, becoming its rector as well as the chief editor of a Catholic weekly.

== Bishop ==
Just a year later, on 25 March 1946, Pope Pius XII appointed him Bishop of Lublin; he was consecrated by Cardinal August Hlond on 12 May that year.

Asked by delegates of the Central Committee of Polish Jews to condemn the Kielce pogrom of 4 July 1946, bishop Wyszyński explained the massacre as popular retribution for Jewish participation in the new Communist government, adding that "the Germans wanted to exterminate the Jewish nation because the Jews spread Communism" (see Żydokomuna). He also claimed that Jewish books consulted during trial of Beilis had not dispelled the accusations of ritual murder, and demanded that the Jews leave Poland. Nevertheless, these accusations have been challenged. In her biography of the cardinal, Ewa K. Czaczkowska writes that such an interpretation of Wyszyński's meeting with the Central Committee of Polish Jews is selective, as a full reading of the protocols from the meeting contains the following: "The bishop condemns all forms of murder from the perspective of Christian ethics, and in the specific case of Kielce he has nothing to add or condemn in particular because the Church always supports the ideal of condemning evil."

Meanwhile, in a letter published in The Times Wyszyński wrote to a Polish Jewish Holocaust survivor who attended the unveiling of the Majdanek memorial: "We have seen among us the common suffering of the war deluge the children of Israel. We have felt with them in their agony and wherever possible we helped them in the common prison which Poland was then, occupied by the invaders. We believe that these sufferings will bring forth the blessed fruit of a better life. Today we rejoice that the martyrs of Maidenek [sic] are honored with a memorial. Let these stones cry to heaven for a durable peace on earth and a mutual love between nations."

After Hlond's death on 22 October 1948, Wyszyński was named Archbishop of Gniezno and Warsaw, and thus Primate of Poland, on 12 November 1948. As the cardinal lay dying, he had asked that Wyszyński's name be forwarded to Rome as a potential replacement.

=== Post-war resistance to Communism ===
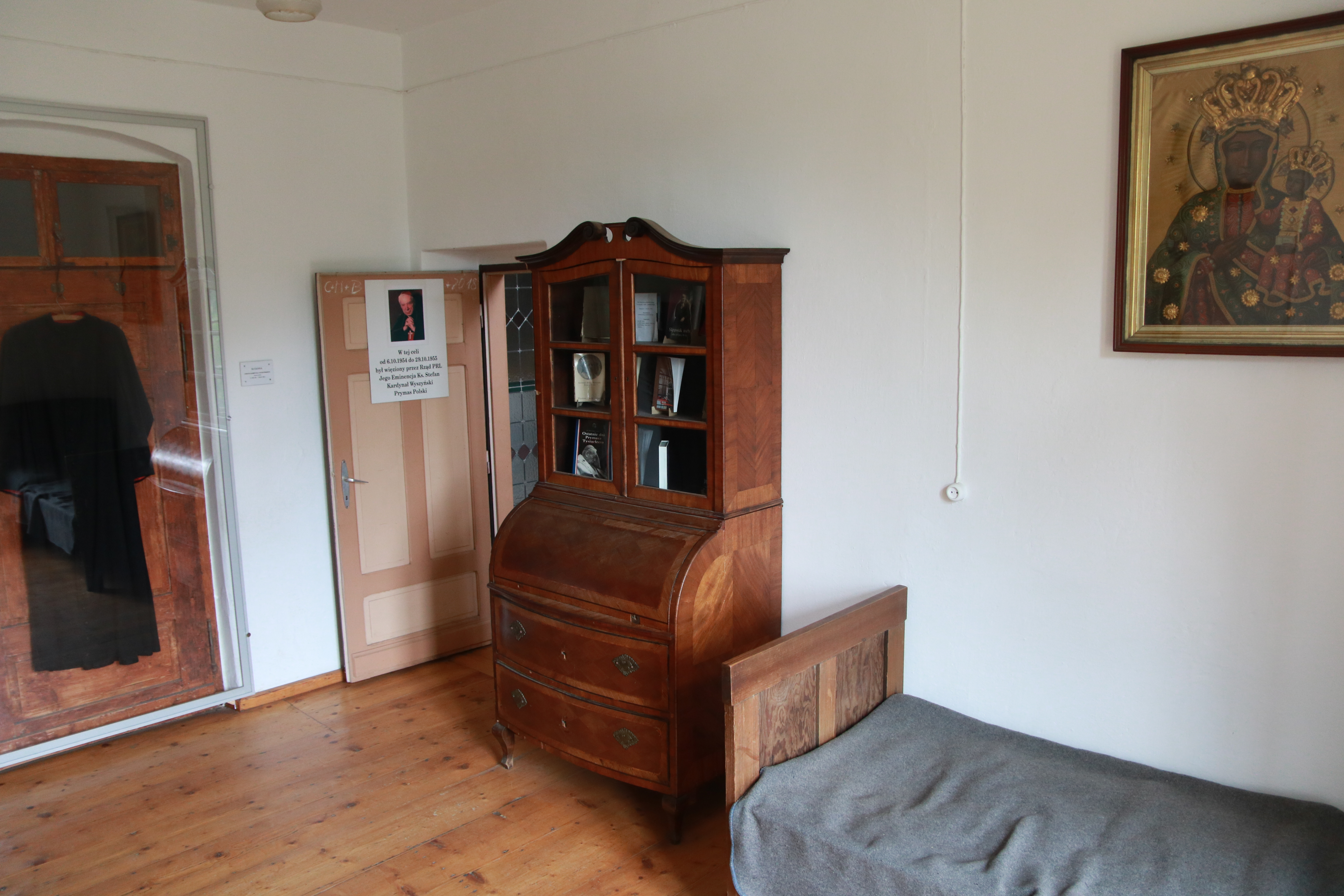
Wyszyński's cell in St. Joseph Church in Prudnik

World War II ended in 1945; however, beginning in the eastern portion of present-day Poland, and later in the west, hostilities continued for several years between a large segment of Poles and the Stalinist government. The Catholic Church hoped for the return of the Polish government-in-exile from London and the removal of Stalin's puppet regime; it actively supported the anti-Communists. One of the prime issues was the confiscation of church property by the Communist government. In 1950, Wyszyński decided to enter into a secret agreement with the Communist authorities, which was signed on 14 April 1950 by the Polish episcopate and the government. The agreement settled the political disputes of the church versus the government in Poland. It allowed the church to hold onto "reasonable" property, separated the church from politics, and even allowed authorities to select a bishop from a list of three candidates.

Beginning in 1953, another wave of persecution swept Poland. The bishops continued their support for anti-Communist resistance, the government began holding mass trials and imprisoning priests. In February 1953 the regime issued a decree which made Church appointments subject to regime approval as well as requiring oath of allegiance. The episcopate, including Wyszyński, released a non possumus where they made their opposition clear. Subsequently Bishop Czesław Kaczmarek was arrested and Wyszyński was asked to condemn him. On 25 September 1953 he was imprisoned at Rywałd, and later placed under house arrest in Stoczek Klasztorny near Lidzbark Warmiński, in Prudnik near Opole and in the Komańcza monastery in the Bieszczady Mountains. While imprisoned, he observed the brutal torture and mistreatment of detainees, some of it highly perverse in nature. He was released on 26 October 1956 following Polish October.

== Cardinal and Primate of Poland ==
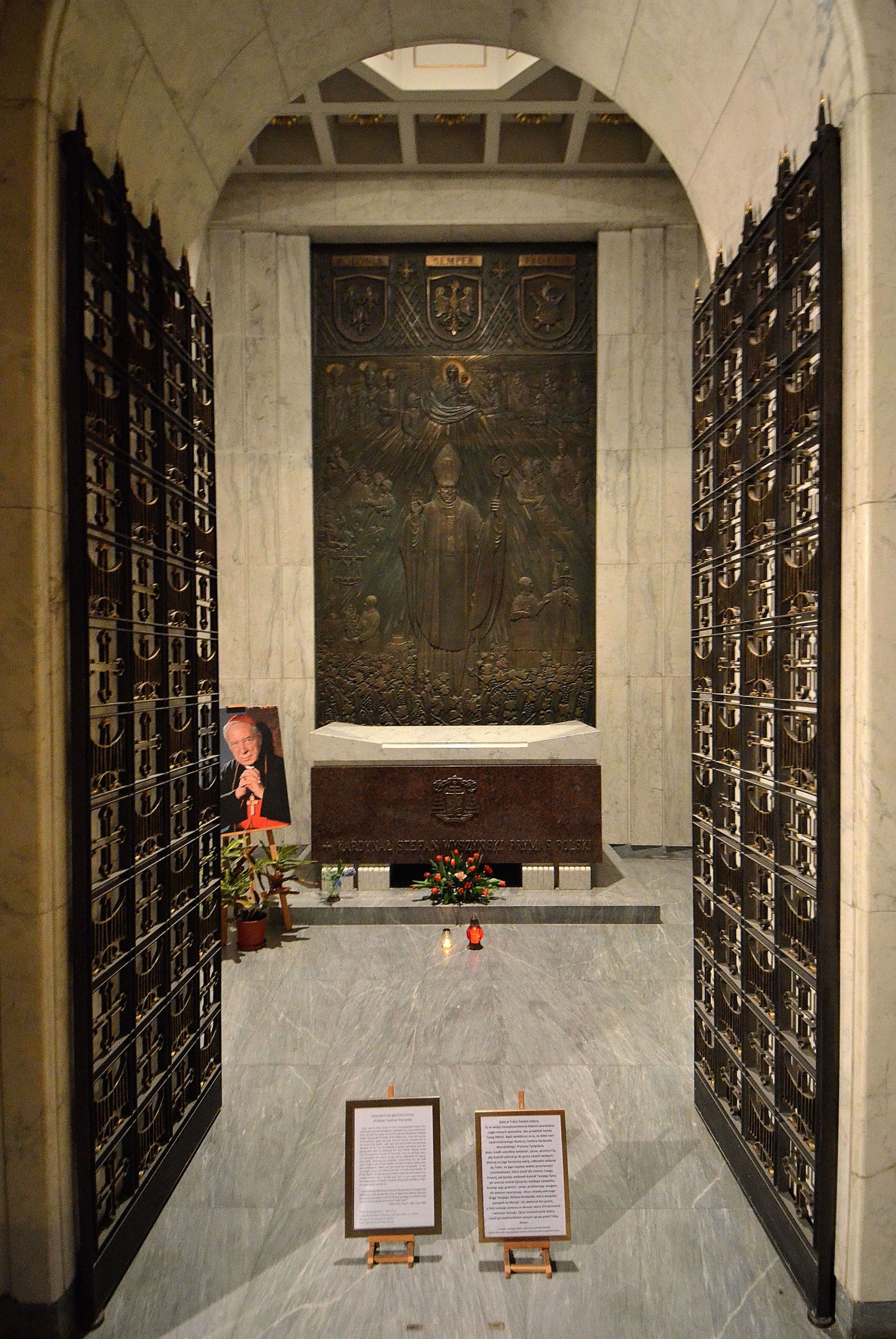
Mausoleum chapel of Cardinal Stefan Wyszyński in St. John's Archcathedral in Warsaw.

On 12 January 1953, Wyszyński was elevated to the rank of cardinal by Pope Pius XII, but it was not until 18 May 1957 that he was designated Cardinal-Priest of Santa Maria in Trastevere.

His crowning achievement was the celebration of Poland's Millennium of Christianity in 1966 — the thousandth anniversary of the baptism of Poland's first historical ruler, Mieszko I. During the celebration, the Communist authorities refused to allow Pope Paul VI to visit Poland and they also prevented Cardinal Wyszyński from attending celebrations abroad. Wyszyński triumphed in 1978, when Karol Wojtyła of Kraków was elected Pope John Paul II, followed by a spectacular papal visit to Poland in 1979. Wyszyński did not turn a blind eye towards the civil unrest in 1980. When the Solidarity trade union was created in Poland, he appealed to both sides, the government as well as the striking workers, to act responsibly.

Cardinal Wyszyński, often called the Primate of the Millennium, died on 28 May 1981 at the age of 79 of abdominal cancer. He is buried in St. John's Archcathedral in Warsaw.

To commemorate the twentieth anniversary of his death, the year 2001 was announced by the Sejm as the Year of Cardinal Stefan Wyszyński. The Sejm also honoured the Cardinal as a "great Pole, chaplain and statesman".

== Legacy ==
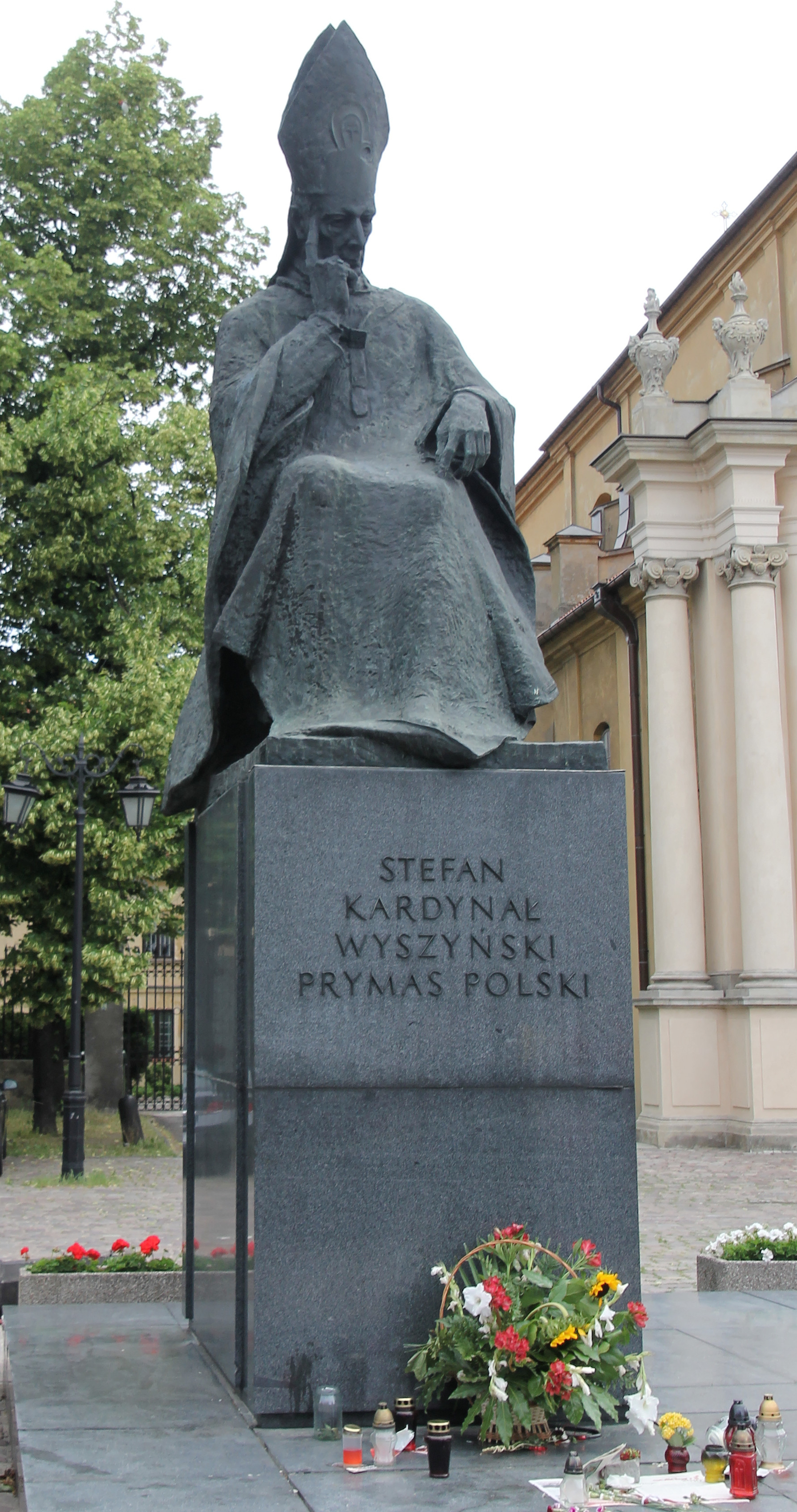
Statue of Wyszyński near the Visitationist Church in Warsaw.

Wyszyński's major achievement was to preserve the position of the Catholic Church as a powerful social institution in Poland into the Communist era. Under Wyszyński, the Church gradually became an autonomous partner to the ruling nomenklatura in shaping the post-war society. Rather than implementing the reforms of the Second Vatican Council, Wyszyński's Church cultivated moral authority by appealing to tradition.

In 1981 Krzysztof Penderecki composed the Agnus Dei of his Polish Requiem in his memory. In 2000, a motion picture was made about the life and imprisonment of Wyszyński. The Primate – Three Years Out of a Thousand was directed by Teresa Kotlarczyk. The title role was played by Andrzej Seweryn.

In the CBS miniseries Pope John Paul II (based on the life of the Polish pope), Cardinal Wyszyński was portrayed by English actor Christopher Lee.

Cardinal Stefan Wyszyński University in Warsaw, earlier the Warsaw Theological Academy, was renamed for him. The Museum of John Paul II and Primate Wyszyński is being constructed at the Temple of Divine Providence in Warsaw.

In 2022, another motion picture of Wyszyński's life was made. Prophet, was directed by Michal Kondrat. The title role was played by Slawomir Grzymkowski.

== Beatification ==
Blessed Stefan Wyszyński Archbishop of Warsaw, Primate of Poland
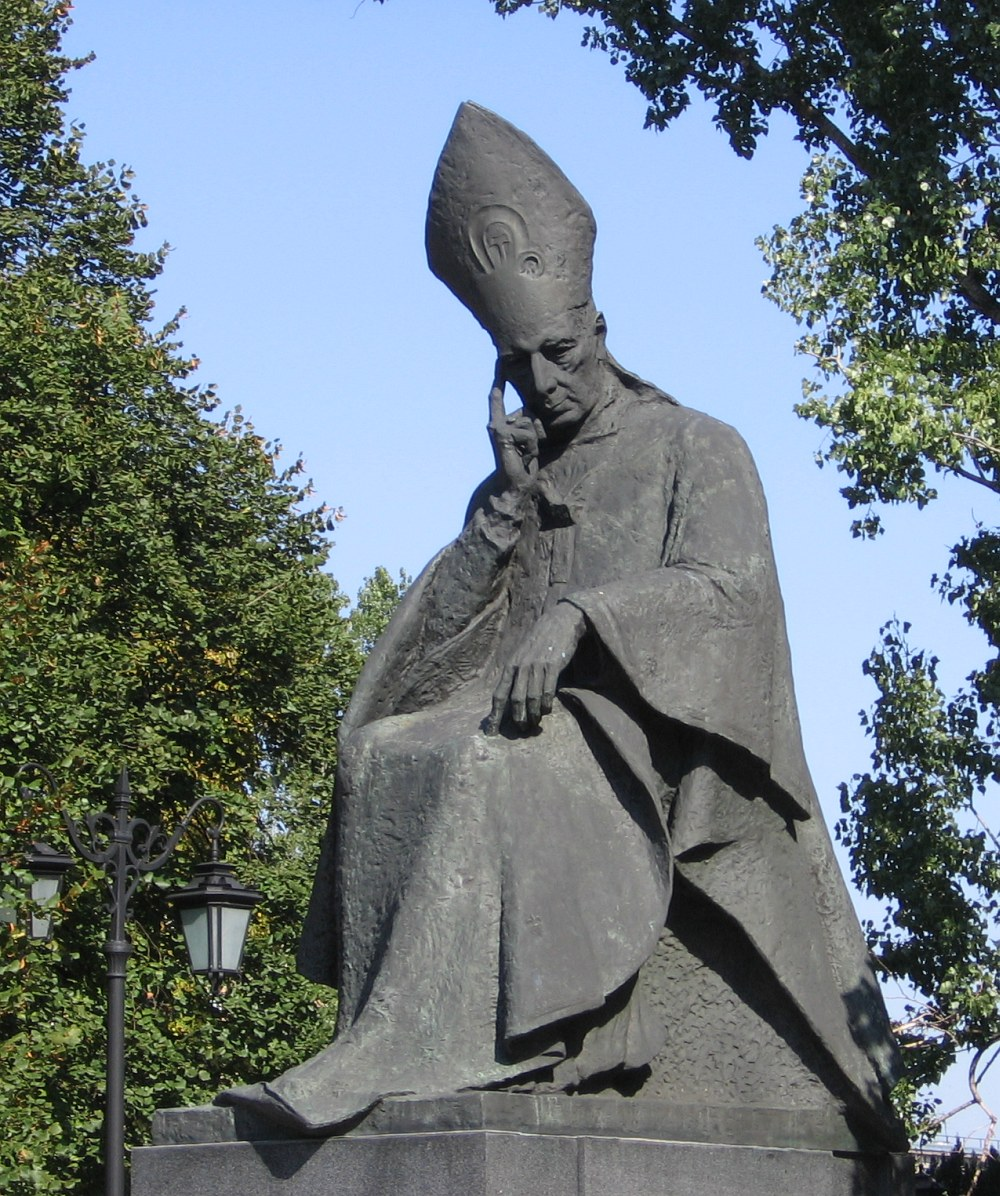

Cardinal and Confessor
- Born: 3 August 1901
- Died: 28 May 1981 (aged 79)
- Venerated in: Catholic Church
- Beatified: 12 September 2021, Warsaw, Poland by Cardinal Marcello Semeraro on behalf of Pope Francis
- Feast: 28 May
- Attributes: Cardinal's attire
- Patronage: Persecuted Christians, Civitas Christiana

The official "nihil obstat" was declared for the late cardinal on 26 April 1989 at the behest of Pope John Paul II. This gave Wyszyński the title of Servant of God and was the first step on the road to sainthood. The diocesan process of the cause commenced on 29 May 1989 and it concluded its business on 6 February 2001; the process was ratified by the Congregation for the Causes of Saints on 8 February 2002 in Rome. The Positio was assembled and was submitted to the Congregation for the Causes of Saints in November 2015 in which documents were submitted to the Cardinal Prefect Angelo Amato from Cardinal Kazimierz Nycz.

Theologians met to discuss the contents of the Positio on 26 April 2016 and voted in favor of the late cardinal's life of heroic virtue. It must be passed onto the members of the C.C.S. before receiving papal approval. The C.C.S. cardinal and bishop members voted and approved the cause in their meeting on 12 December 2017. Pope Francis confirmed his heroic virtue on 18 December 2017 and titled the late cardinal as Venerable.

An investigation on a diocesan level was initiated on 27 March 2012 for an alleged miracle attributed to him which concluded its business on 28 May 2013; the process was validated on 10 October 2014. The documentation proceeded from that point to Rome for further evaluation, but this evaluation could only take place upon the declaration of his heroic virtue (this happened in 2017 allowing for the miracle to be further assessed). The medical experts in Rome approved the miracle on 29 November 2018 with theologians later confirming it as well as the cardinals and bishops comprising the Congregation on 24 September 2019.

On 3 October 2019, the Congregation for the Causes of the Saints officially approved the miracle, the last step to his beatification after the Congregation's members themselves approved the miracle on 24 September. The beatification was scheduled to take place in Warsaw on 7 June 2020 but was delayed because of the COVID-19 pandemic. The beatification was rescheduled and celebrated on 12 September 2021 with Cardinal Marcello Semeraro presiding on the Pope's behalf.

== See also ==
- Letter of Reconciliation of the Polish Bishops to the German Bishops

== Bibliography ==
- Congar, Yves (2012), My Journal of the Council, Adelaide: ATF Press, ISBN 9781921817441
- Czaczkowska E., Kardynał Wyszyński, Świat Książki, Warszawa 2009, ISBN 978-83-247-1341-7;
- Micewski A., Kardynał Wyszyński. Prymas i mąż stanu, Éditions du Dialogue, Paris 1982, ISBN 2-85316-038-6;
- Michlic, Joanna; Polonsky, Antony (2005), "Catholicism and the Jews in Post-Communist Poland", in Lederhendler, Eli (ed.), Jews, Catholics, and the Burden of History, New York: Oxford University Press, pp. 35–64, ISBN 978-0-19-530491-6
- Romaniuk M.P., Prymas Wyszyński. Biografia i wybrane źródła, Gaudentinum, Gniezno 2001, ISBN 83-87926-50-7;
- Shneiderman, Samuel Leib (1947), Between Fear and Hope, New York: Arco
- Szeloch H., Rodzina wobec pomocniczości i dobra wspólnego w nauczaniu społecznym Stefana Kardynała Wyszyńskiego – Prymasa Polski, PWT Wrocław 1988.

== Books ==
- Love and Social Justice: Reflections on Society, Arouca Press, 2021 ISBN 978-1989905913

Catholic Church titles
Preceded by August Hlond	Primate of Poland; 1948–1981	Succeeded by Józef Glemp
Preceded by August Hlond	Archbishop of Gniezno; 1948–1981	Succeeded by Józef Glemp
Preceded by August Hlond	Archbishop of Warsaw; 1948–1981	Succeeded by Józef Glemp
Preceded by Marian Leon Fulman	Bishop of Lublin; 4 March 1946 – 12 November 1948	Succeeded by Piotr Kałwa
Preceded by Pedro Segura y Saenz	Cardinal Priest of Santa Maria in Trastevere; 18 May 1957 – 28 May 1981	Succeeded by Józef Glemp
