= Museum of John Paul II and Primate Wyszyński =

Museum in Warsaw, Poland

Coordinates: 52°09′31″N 21°04′20″E

Museum of John Paul II and Primate Wyszynski
- Muzeum Jana Pawła II i Prymasa Wyszyńskiego
- Established: May 18, 2010
- Location: Wilanów, Warsaw, Poland
- Director: Paweł Skibiński
- Website: www.muzeumjp2.pl

The Museum of John Paul II and Primate Wyszyński (Polish: Muzeum Jana Pawła II i Prymasa Wyszyńskiego) is a Roman Catholic cultural and educational institution affiliated with the Archdiocese of Warsaw, honoring two prominent Polish Catholic leaders Saint John Paul II, the first Polish Pope, and Cardinal Stefan Wyszyński, the Archbishop of Warsaw and Gniezno and Primate of Poland. It was established by a decree of 18 May 2010 issued by Archbishop Kazimierz Nycz.

The museum is located at the Temple of Divine Providence, which constitutes its integral part. The museum’s exhibition space, which was under construction as of 2014, is housed 26 metres (85 ft) above ground in the area surrounding the dome of the Church.

== Mission ==
The Museum of John Paul II and Primate Wyszyński recognizes their contribution to Polish culture and preserves the memory of their resistance against the Nazi and communist totalitarian systems, which in the 20th century had exterminated many Polish citizens and attempted to overrun Poland's cultural identity. The museum was also commissioned to commemorate the role of the Catholic Church in Polish culture and society in the 20th century.

The Narrative Museum will be a time vehicle. The use of multimedia, decorations and sound effects is intended to take the visitor through a course of events and invite them to co-participate in the men's history.

== Project ==
The main exhibition covers the period from 1901, the year Stefan Wyszyński was born, to 2005, the year John Paul II died.

The main exhibition was designed by the Kłaput Project (Barbara and Jarosław Kłaputowie).

== The main exhibition ==
The main exhibition will consist of ten zones to highlight specific historical events. Four events of the twentieth century symbolize moments of special unity between the Polish nation and the Catholic Church: the Millennium of the Baptism of Poland in 1966; the first papal Mass conducted at Victory Square in Warsaw in June 1979; the Solidarity (Polish trade union) of 1980; and the Great Jubilee of the year 2000.

The museum collections, audiovisual materials and other archival works will be used in the completed exhibition.

=== Key exhibits ===
- Plac Zwycięstwa (Victory Square) (1979) - A place that has been changing, and the ite of historical events.
- Powołanie (1901-1945 r.) - The period during which Wyszyński and Wojtyła were involved in activities to free Poland, including confrontation with two totalitarian systems during the Second World War.
- “A Seed which Must Die” (1945-1956) - The imprisonment of Primate Wyszyński and persecution of the Church by the communist regime.
- Millennium – National Confession of Faith (1956-1966)
- Behind Iron Curtain (1966-1978) - The Polish contribution to the Second Vatican Council, with special emphasis on the role of Wojtyła and Wyszyński.
- Gaude Mater Polonia [Rejoice Poland, the Mother] (1978-1981) - Karol Wojtyła elected pope. The experience of unity in Poland during the first papal travel to his homeland and the formation of the “Solidarity” movement.
- Confrontation with the Evil Empire (1981-1989) - May 1981 was the date of the John Paul II assassination attempt and the death of Primate Wyszyński.
- The Gift of Freedom (1989-2005)
- The Church Founded on the Rock of Love. The pope leads the Church into the Third Millennium.
- The Pope and Youth - relations between John Paul II and youth.

== Educational activity ==
The museum offers educational projects for all-aged students both onsite and in schools. The workshops revolve around John Paul II's travels, his evangelizing message and Primate Wyszyński's attitudes about communism.

Special activities will occur on the anniversaries of the papal visits to Poland with conferences and temporary exhibitions. Conference proceedings are published every year.

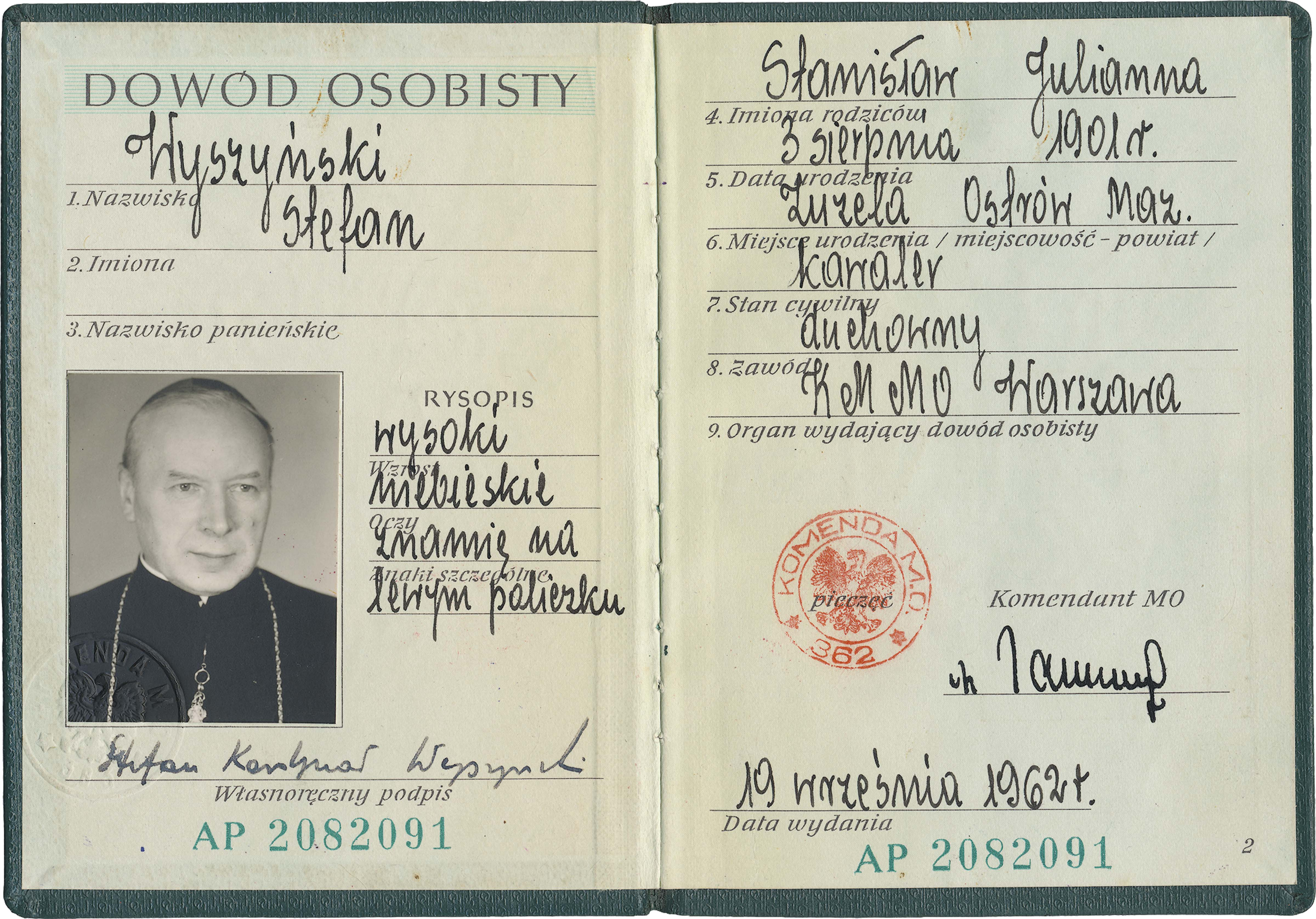
Cardinal Stefan Wyszyński's ID

Since 2012, on the anniversary of Wyszyński’s death, the museum has arranged sightseeing tours of the Residence of the Archbishops of Warsaw.
