= Komańcza Monastery =

Coordinates: 49°20′57″N 22°04′30″E

Komancza Monastery
- Congregatio Sanctae Familiae de Nazareth in Komańcza
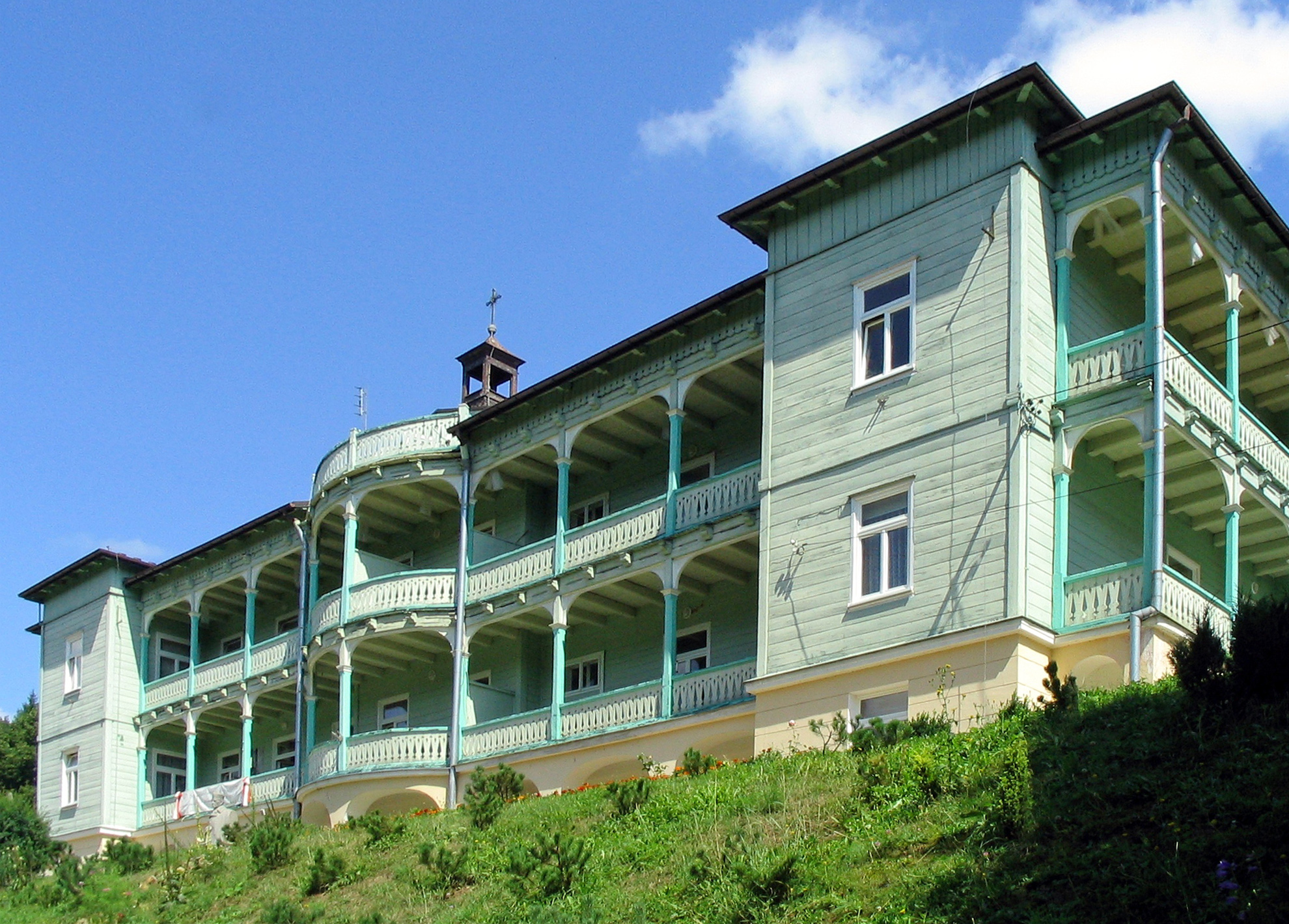
- Komancza Monastery
- Location: Komańcza, Bieszczady Mountains
- Country: Poland
- Denomination: Roman Catholic

Architecture
- Style: Swiss

Specifications
- Materials: wood, bricks

The Monastery of Sisters of the Holy Family of Nazareth in Komańcza (Polish: Klasztor Zgromadzenia Sióstr Najświętszej Rodziny z Nazaretu w Komańczy, Klasztor nazaretanek) opened in May 1928. It was established as a house of the Assembly of Nuns of the Holy Family of Nazareth, in the diocese of Przemyśl. At the beginning of 1927 in a rented house lived five sisters, working mainly in the parish church and the vestry. The Swiss-style building with the brick ground flour and wooden upper floors was built on a mountain meadow by the builders from Rymanów in 1929, and consecrated in 1931. During the Nazi German occupation in the monastery quartered German soldiers. At the same time nuns hid wanted priests and Jewish people.

Cardinal Stefan Wyszynski was, from 29 October 1955 to 28 October 1956, interned in the monastery .
