= Zuzela =

- Village
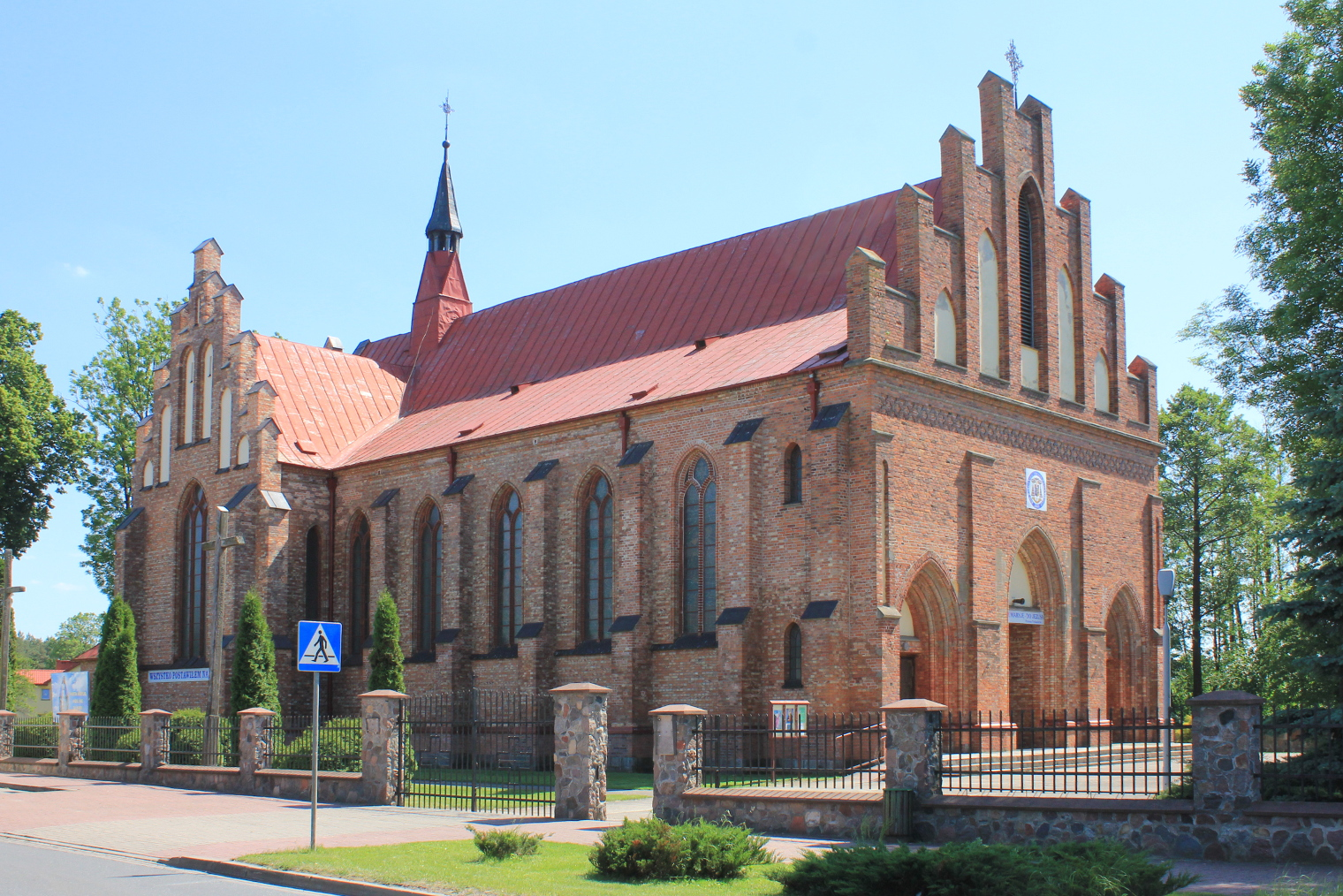
- Church of the transfiguration of Jesus Christ in Zuzela

- Location within Poland
- Coordinates: 52°41′N 22°14′E
- Country: Poland
- Voivodeship: Masovian
- County: Ostrów
- Gmina: Nur
- Population: 199
- Time zone: UTC+1 (CET)
  - Summer (DST): UTC+2 (CEST)
- Vehicle registration: WOR

Zuzela [zuˈzɛla] is a village in the administrative district of Gmina Nur, within Ostrów County, Masovian Voivodeship, in east-central Poland.

Cardinal Stefan Wyszyński was born in the village.
