= Temple of Divine Providence =

Polish Roman Catholic church

Coordinates: 52°09′31″N 21°04′20″E

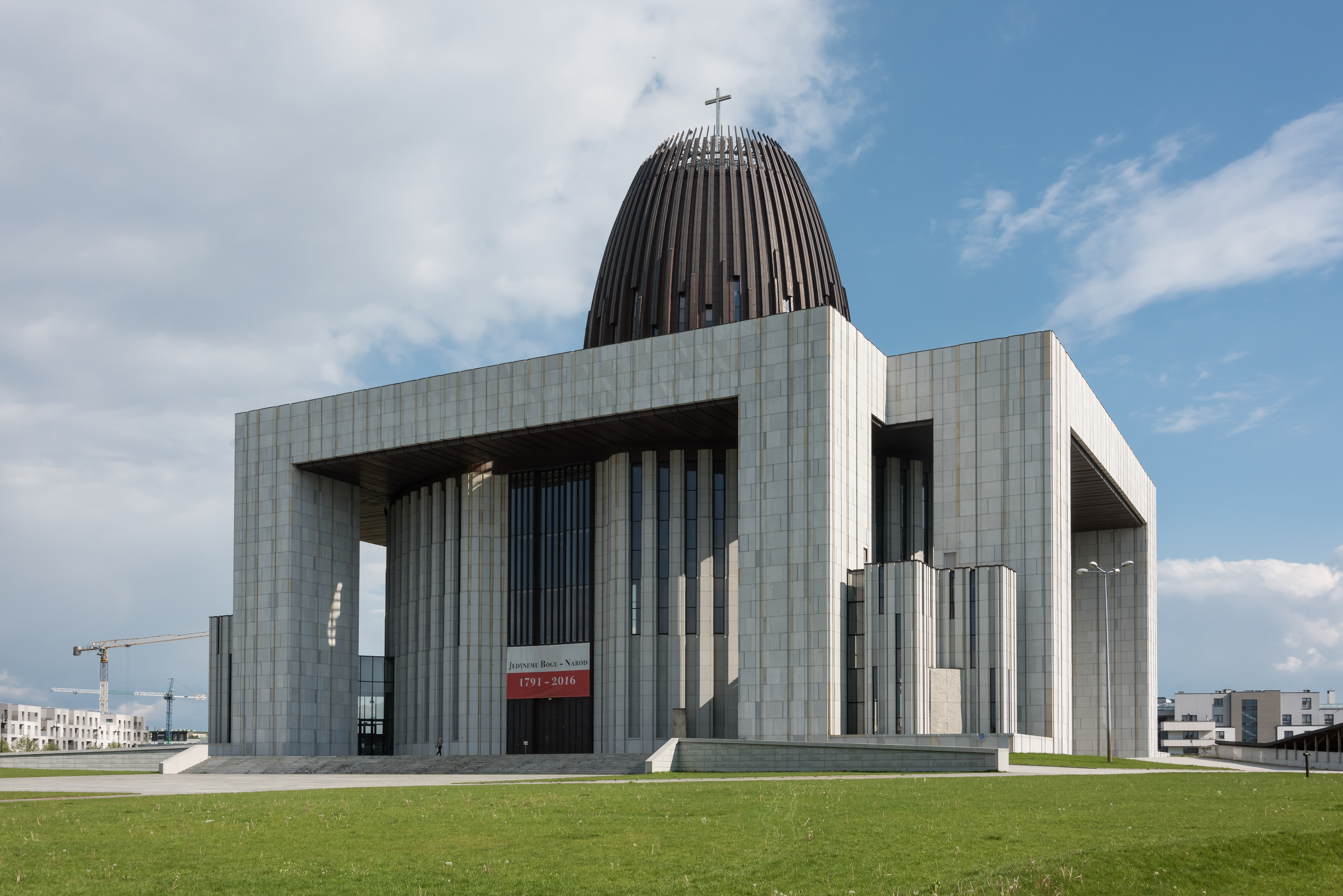
- In 2020

Religion
- Affiliation: Roman Catholic
- Year consecrated: 2016

Location
- Location: Warsaw, Poland
- Interactive map of Temple of Divine Providence

Architecture
- Architects: Wojciech Szymborski, Lech Szymborski
- Type: Church

Specifications
- Height (max): 75 m
- Materials: Concrete, Copper

The Temple of Divine Providence (Polish: Świątynia Opatrzności Bożej) is a principal Roman Catholic church in Poland, located within the Wilanów district of Warsaw. The backstory of its construction began in the 18th century. The Temple is conceived as a national and religious symbol for Poland. The complex comprises the Church of Divine Providence, the Museum of John Paul II and Primate Wyszyński, and the Pantheon of Great Poles.

The Center of Divine Providence commemorates Poland as a country with a Roman Catholic majority and links providential events in Poland's history over the past 200 years with their putative divine inspiration: the Constitution of May 3, 1791; the 1918 rebirth of independent Poland; the 1920 "Miracle at the Vistula"; the August 1980 founding of the Solidarity movement; the next resumption of independence, in 1989; and the pastoral ministry of Stefan Wyszynski and the pontificate of Pope John Paul II. The Center is a votive church for 1,000 years of Poland's Christianity.

== History ==
=== First Polish Republic ===
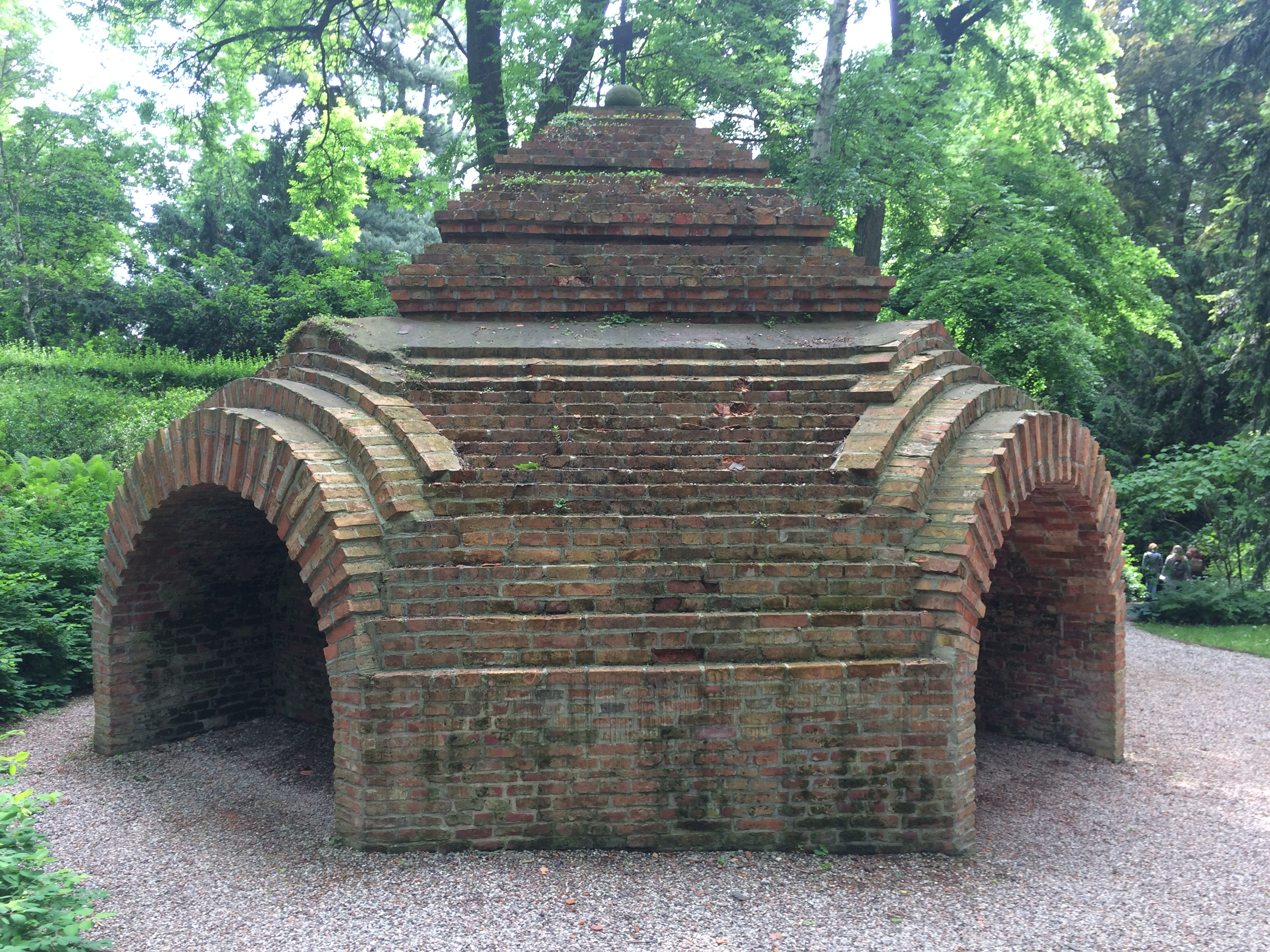
Ruined chapel, in Warsaw University Botanical Garden, containing cornerstone for Temple of Divine Providence, laid 3 May 1792

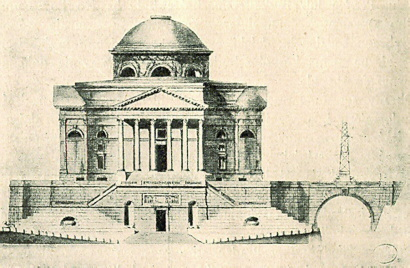
Jakub Kubicki's design, 1792

The idea of building a Temple of Divine Providence goes back to the reign of Stanisław August Poniatowski. On 5 May 1791, two days after the Four-Year Sejm had adopted the Constitution of 3 May 1791, Sejm deputies and the King resolved to erect a church "ex voto of all estates... dedicated to the highest Providence." The Temple was to express thanksgiving to "the Highest Ruler of the fate of nations" for the Constitution's adoption.

The laying of the cornerstone in Warsaw's Ujazdów district took place on the first anniversary of the Constitution's adoption. King Stanisław August Poniatowski and his brother, the last Catholic Primate of the Polish–Lithuanian Commonwealth, Archbishop Michał Jerzy Poniatowski, laid the cornerstone.

The King accepted the classicist design of his royal architect, Jakub Kubicki, for the Temple, which was to be built on the plan of a Greek cross. However, the Russian Imperial Army invaded Poland, making construction impossible, and three years later Poland disappeared from the map of Europe. The only survival of the planned Temple is a small ruined chapel in the Warsaw University Botanical Garden, containing the cornerstone.

=== Second Polish Republic ===
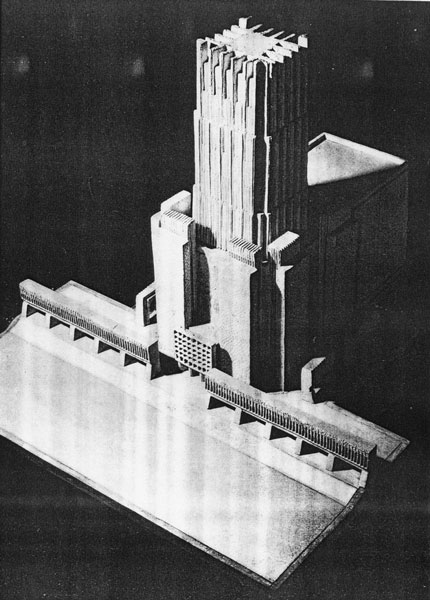
Bohdan Pniewski's proposal, 1939

After Poland regained independence in 1918 the Sejm of the restored Second Polish Republic passed an act to build the shrine on 17 March 1921. The Parliament decided that the state would cover the cost of the construction, which was to be 15 million old zlotys. The budget was also to finance a perpetual scholarship to order Masses celebrated in the intention of the Homeland and for the souls of all Poles who died for the country. However, financial difficulties and inflation did not allow the young state to bear such costs. The Committee on Commemorating Marshal Józef Piłsudski, created after his death, chaired by President Ignacy Mościcki, decided to carry out the project. The Shrine of Divine Providence was to be built in the fields of Mokotów. The Committee announced a tender and chose Bohdan Pniewski's design: a building of the constructivist style with a tower that would resemble the skyscrapers of New York. However, the start date was constantly postponed; finally, it was settled in 1939, the year in which Germany and the Soviet Union invaded Poland, starting World War II.

=== Third Polish Republic ===
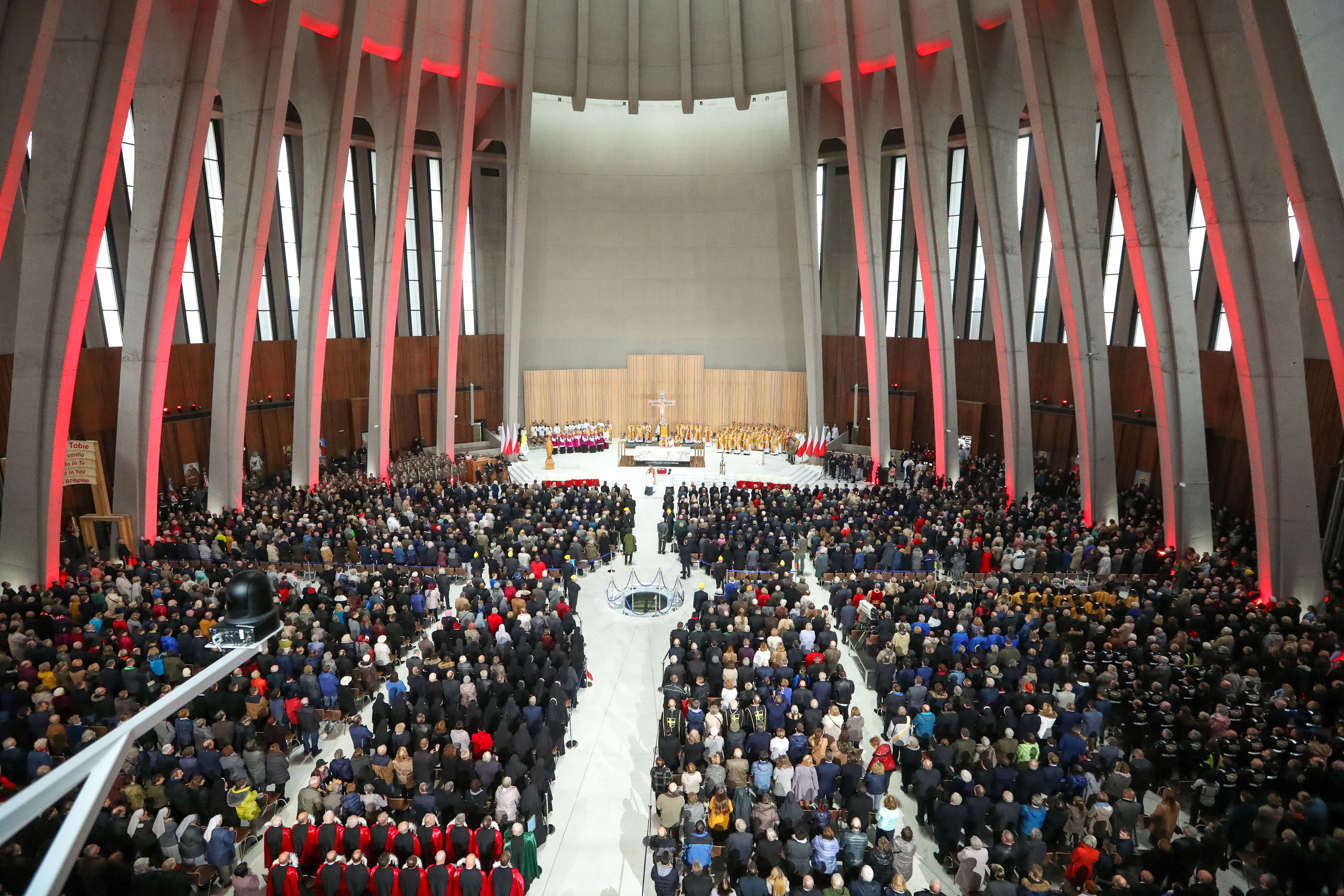
Interior of the Temple of Divine Providence

The project could not be realised during the war. The post-war communist Polish People's Republic did not continue with the project. Following the fall of communism in 1989, the Primate of Poland Cardinal Jozef Glemp revived the idea of the shrine in the late 1990s. The Sejm on 23 October 1998 adopted, by a decisive majority, an act to construct the National Temple of Divine Providence. The resolution said that "the Sejm of the Third Republic of Poland thinks that the vows the Polish nation made 200 years ago should be fulfilled" and the shrine would be "a votive church of the nation for the Constitution of 3 May, the regained independence in 1989, for twenty years of John Paul II's pontificate and two thousand years of Christianity."

John Paul II also supported the construction of the Temple. In his pilgrimage to Poland in 1999, during the celebration in Piłsudski Square, he blessed the cornerstone, which was embedded at the position of the future altar. He said, "May this shrine become a place of special thanksgiving for freedom of the Homeland. I pray that no painful experience would disturb this thanksgiving for which we have waited 200 years." The Pope prayed for the construction and provided financial help. The shrine is being constructed in Wilanów, the end of the historic Royal Route.

In January 2002, the Primate chose the final design of the shrine by the architects' team directed by Wojciech and Lech Szymborski, with an estimated cost of around 40 million euros. This sum was met to a large extent through private donations and co-financed by a state budget. The building is based on an 84 m x 84 m base area in the form of a Greek cross – a cross with four equal length arms, with four gates, a dome and a cross. The building will has an overall height of around 75 metres. 26 columns are arranged in a circle to form the nave of the church which has a 68 m diameter. In November 2002, Cardinal Glemp began the construction by making a symbolic gesture; he dug with a spade next to the cornerstone.

Due to its shape the building is informally known in the press and among varsovians as The Lemon Squeezer (Wyciskarka do Cytryn).

The temple was officially opened on Poland's Independence Day, 11 November 2016, by Cardinal Kazimierz Nycz, the archbishop of Warsaw. The ceremony was attended by President Andrzej Duda, Prime Minister Beata Szydło, speakers of both houses of parliament and other politicians. The official opening does not mean that all construction work is complete, as some finishing touches are still needed.

== Museum of John Paul II and Cardinal Wyszyński ==
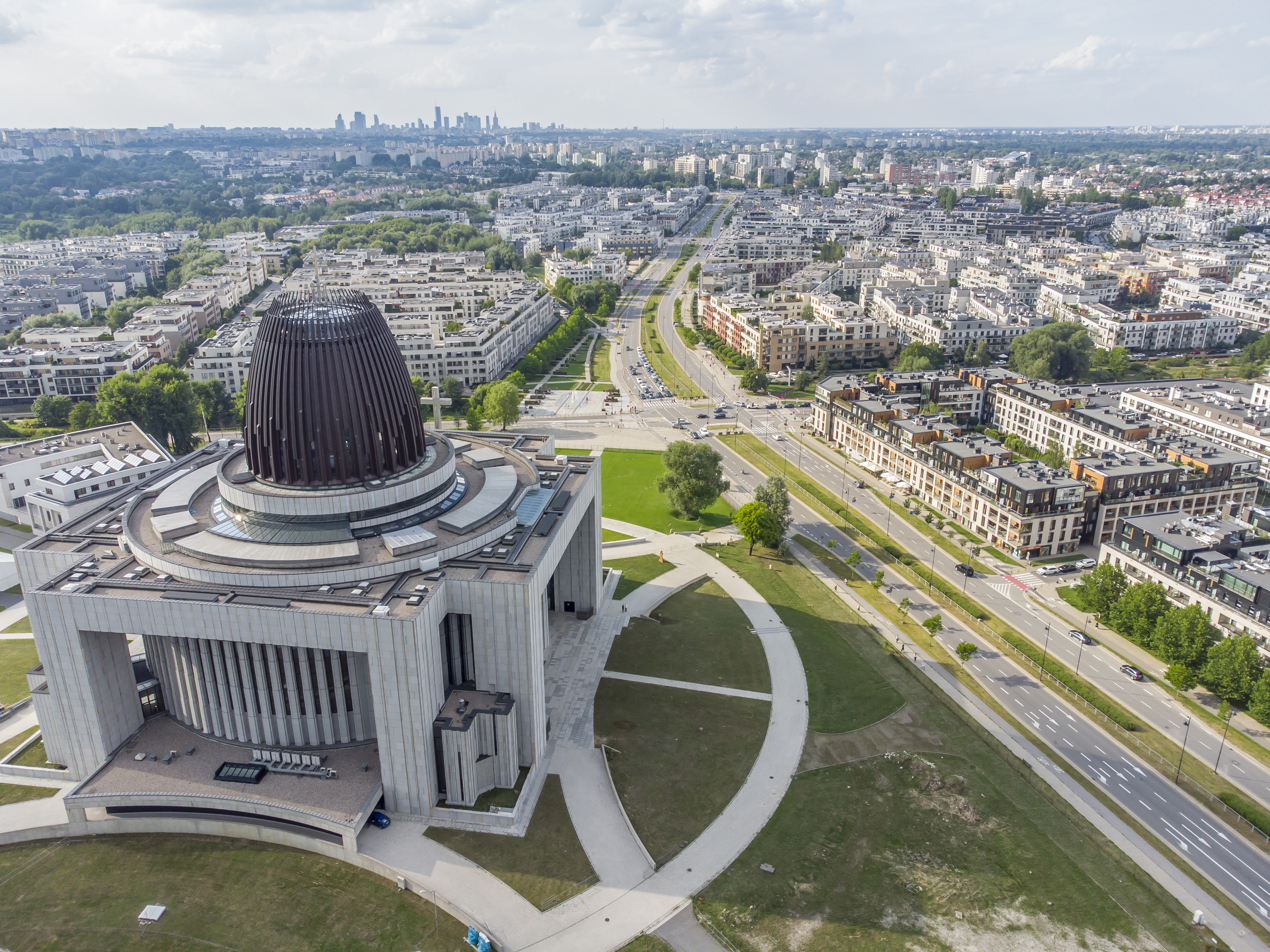
Aerial view of the temple.

The complex of Divine Providence will house a multi-media museum dedicated to Pope John Paul II and to Cardinal Stefan Wyszyński. The museum will be placed in the non-sacred part of Temple of Divine Providence in Warsaw. The centre for documenting the Polish Pope's pontificate and the pastoral ministry of Cardinal Stefan Wyszyński will be in the modern museum. The cultural centre will catalogue the collections and preserve them as well as conducting research. The museum will show the activities of John Paul II and Cardinal Stefan Wyszyński and will show the close relationship between the two Poles. Archbishop Kazimierz Nycz would like this multi-media museum to follow the model of the Museum of the Warsaw Uprising, that draws many young people. The Centre of Divine Providence will show the substantial contribution of the Church to the history of the Polish Nation.

== Pantheon of Great Poles ==
The Pantheon of Great Poles is an underground part of the Temple of Divine Providence in Warsaw. The Pantheon is a funeral site for important Poles. A symbolic tomb for Pope John Paul II (a replica of his tomb in St. Peter's Basilica) is placed in the Pantheon.

Inside the crypt for the honoured are buried:

- Jan Twardowski (1 June 1915 – 18 January 2006) a famous Polish poet, representative of contemporary religious lyrics.
- Zdzisław Peszkowski (23 August 1918 – 8 October 2007) a chaplain for the Katyń Families Association, and the Murdered in the East, and a prisoner in Kozelsk.
- Krzysztof Skubiszewski (8 October 1926 – 8 February 2010) Minister of Foreign Affairs (1989–1993) and an established scholar in the field of international law.
- Ryszard Kaczorowski (26 November 1919 – 10 April 2010) last President of Poland in exile (1989–1990).

In 2022, the remains of three former presidents in exile, Władysław Raczkiewicz, August Zaleski and Stanisław Ostrowski, were transferred from the Polish cemetery in Newark-on-Trent, United Kingdom, to the Temple for reburial.

== See also ==
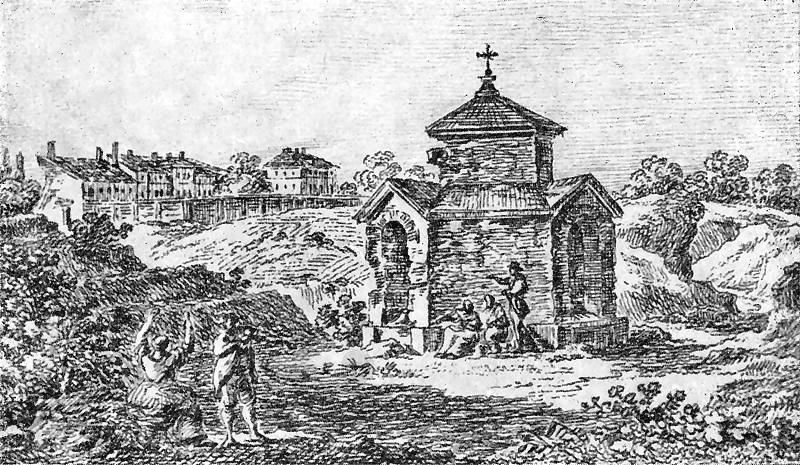
Original appearance of ruined chapel after Temple of Divine Providence could not be built in 1792

- Places of worship in Warsaw
- Museum of John Paul II and Primate Wyszyński
