= Radoszyce, Podkarpackie Voivodeship =

Lemko village in Poland

Radoszyce Радошицї
- Village
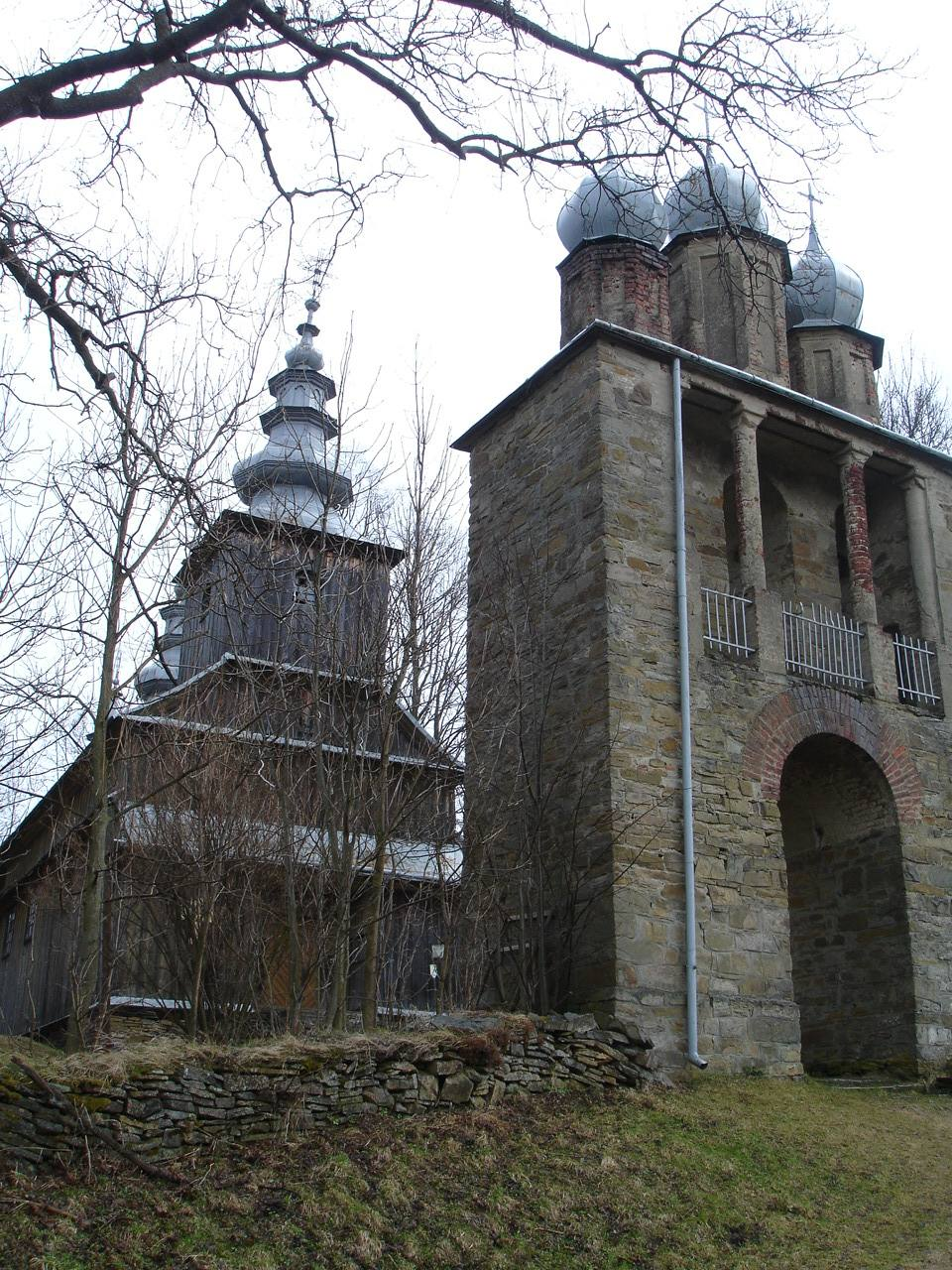

- Location within Poland
- Coordinates: 49°18′20″N 22°02′38″E
- Country: Poland
- Voivodeship: Subcarpathian
- County: Sanok
- Gmina: Komańcza
- Founded: 1366

Area
  - Total: 25.6 km^{2} (9.9 sq mi)
- Elevation: 570 m (1,870 ft)

Population
  - Total: 150

Radoszyce [radɔˈʂɨt͡sɛ] village in Lesser Poland, the southeastern part of Poland in the Bieszczadys. Situated in the Subcarpathian Voivodship (since 1999), previously in Krosno Voivodeship (1975–1998) and Gmina Komańcza in Sanok County, located near the towns of Medzilaborce and Palota (in northeastern Slovakia).

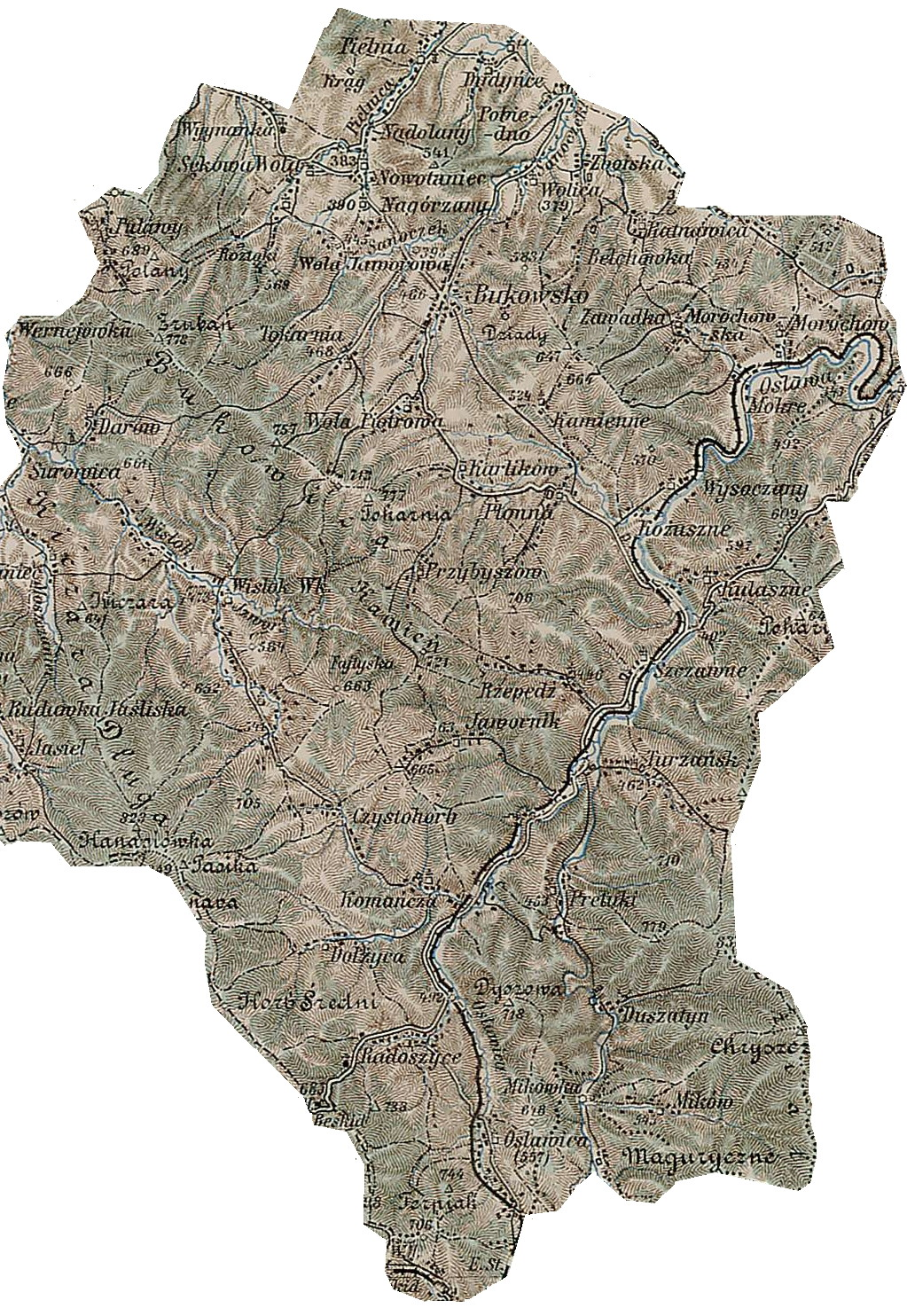
Gerichts-Bezirk ( Bukowsko Rural Commune) bis 1918. An 1898 map shows the location of Radoszyce (click in it to enlarge)

It is situated below the main watershed at the foot of the Radoszyce Mountain Pass, and has an elevation of 570 metres. It is the oldest settlement in the Osławica river-basin, in the Roman era trade route that passed through this area.

In the centre of the village there is a wooden Greek-Catholic church of Saint Demitrius dating 1868 which now serves as the Roman Catholic Church. The wooden church was renovated in 1899. A filial church is located in Osławica, 3 km (2 mi) away. Inside the church there is an original iconostas and Rococo altar from the 18th century. Above the village there is a chapel by a stream with a "miraculous spring". Inside the chapel there is an interesting, contemporary icon of Christ in Gethsemane.

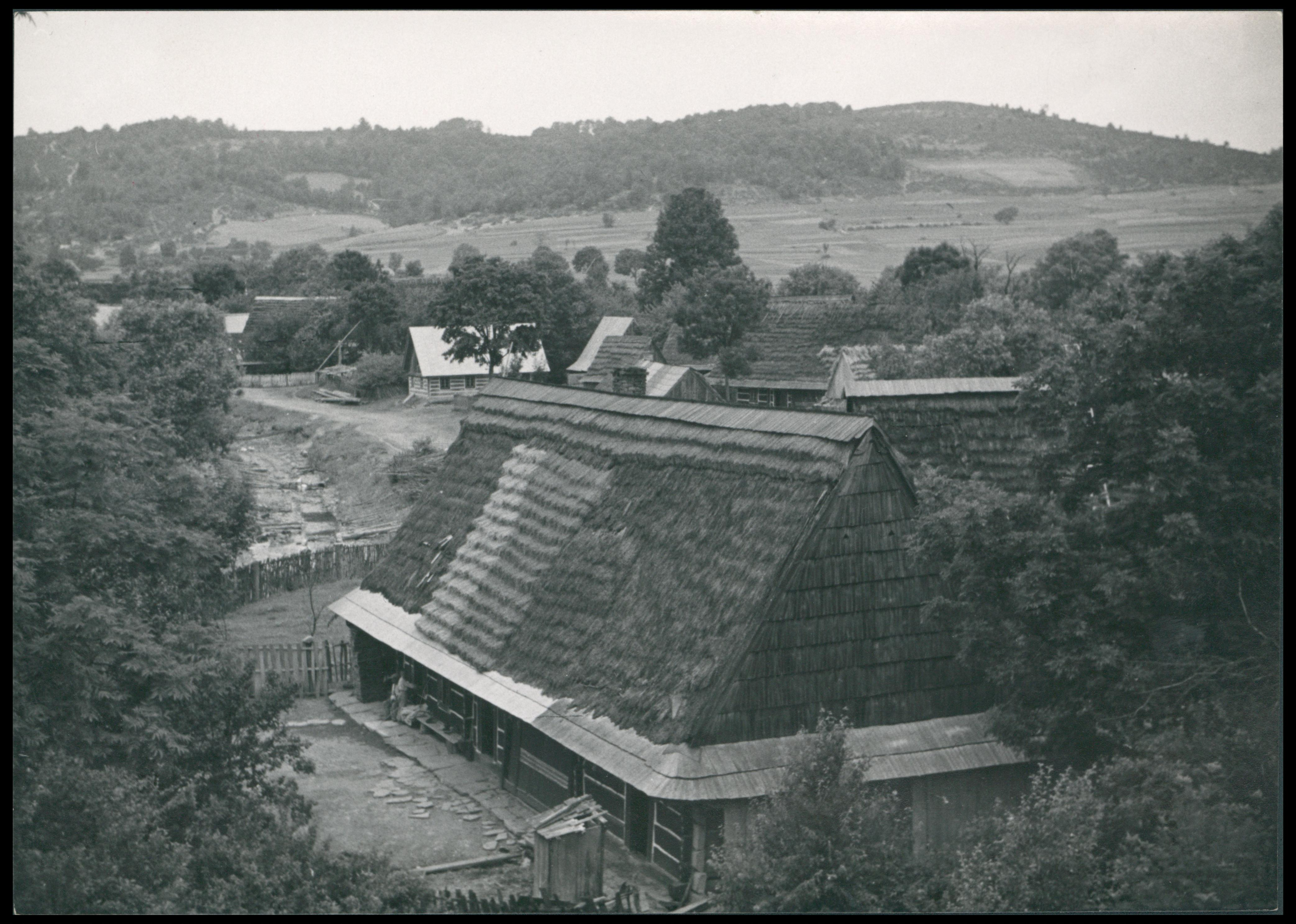
View of the village, before 1936

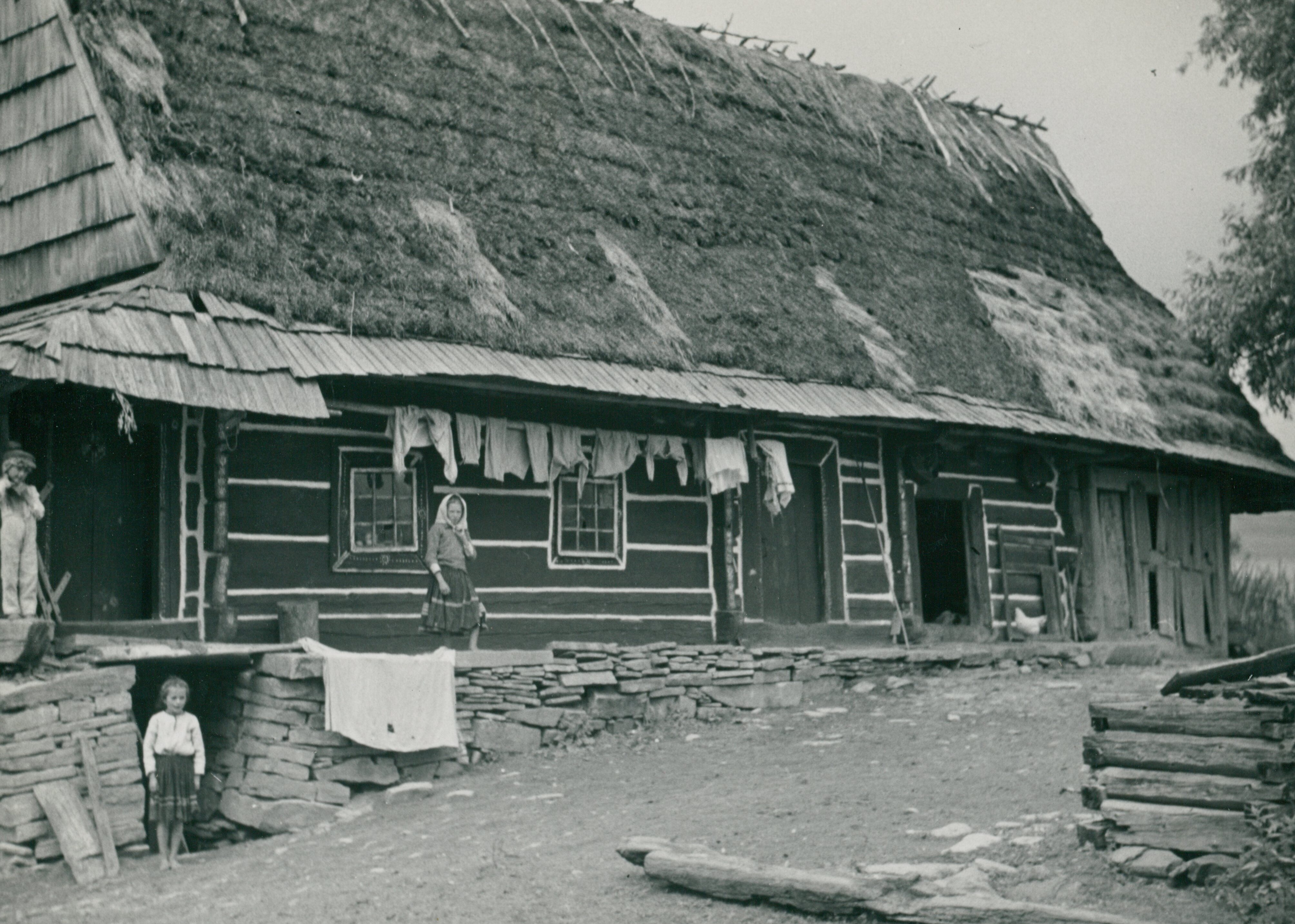
Lemko cottage, before 1936

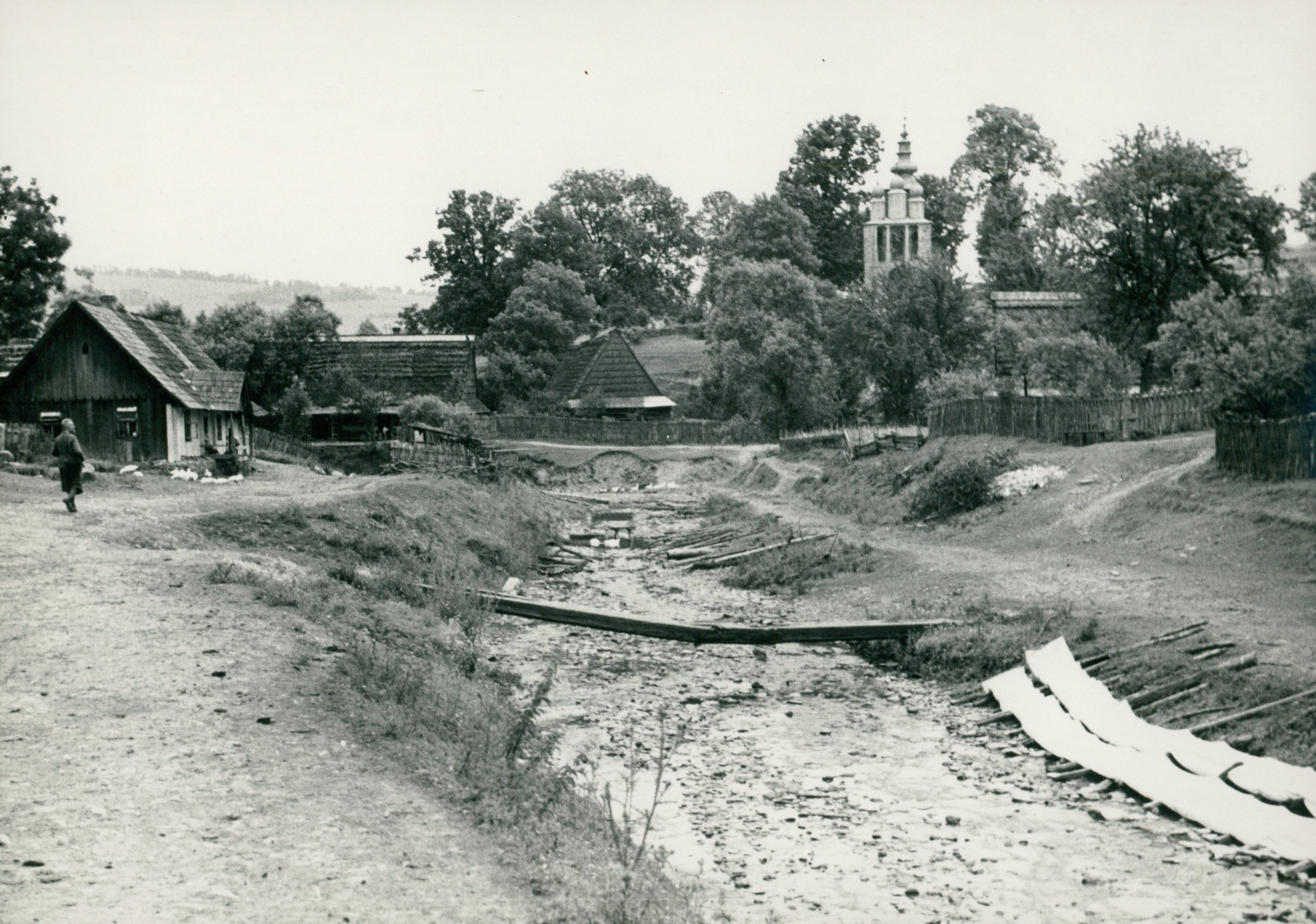
View in the 1930s
