= Banniczka =

- Village
- Location within Poland
- Coordinates: 49°13′N 22°12′E
- Country: Poland
- Voivodeship: Subcarpathian
- County: Sanok
- Gmina: Komańcza

Banniczka [baˈɲːit͡ʂka] is a village in the administrative district of Gmina Komańcza, within Sanok County, Subcarpathian Voivodeship, in south-eastern Poland, close to the border with Slovakia.
