= Jasiel, Podkarpackie Voivodeship =

Jasiel
- Village
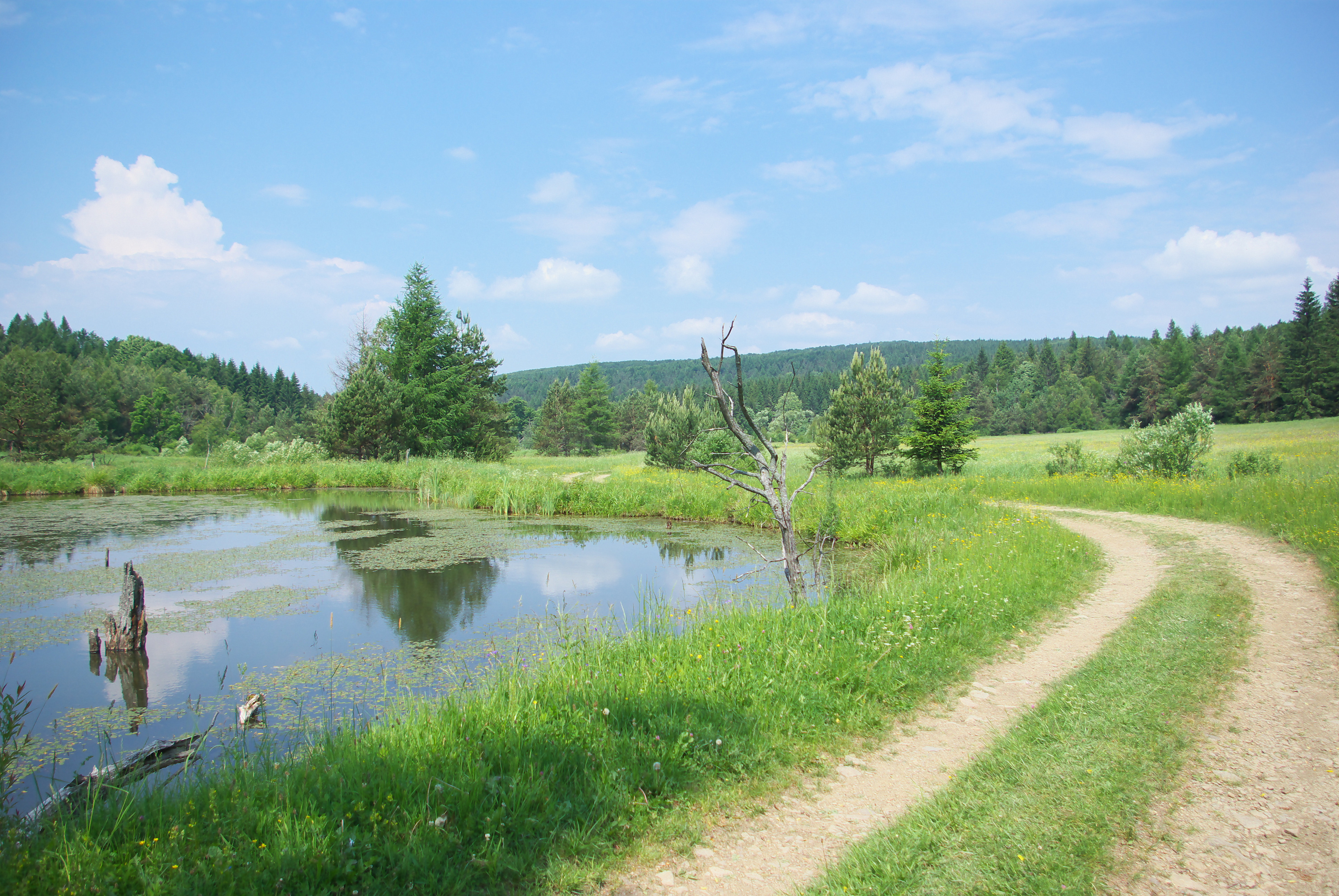

- Location within Poland
- Coordinates: 49°22′N 21°55′E
- Country: Poland
- Voivodeship: Subcarpathian
- County: Sanok
- Gmina: Komańcza
- Population: 0

Jasiel [ˈjaɕɛl] is a former village in the administrative district of Gmina Komańcza, within Sanok County, Subcarpathian Voivodeship, in south-eastern Poland, close to the border with Slovakia.

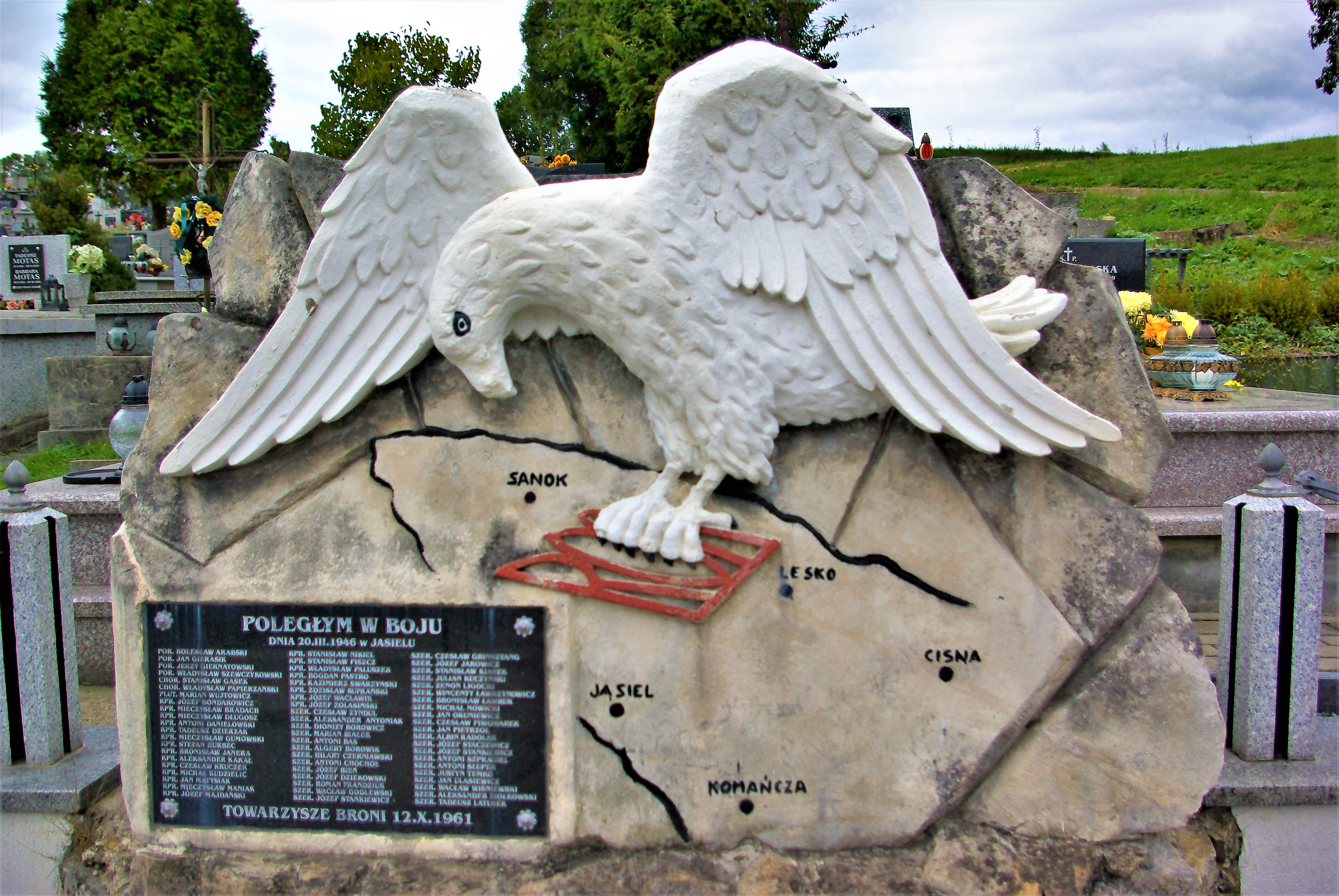
Monument to Polish soldiers killed by UPA in Jasiel, south-eastern Poland, in 1946

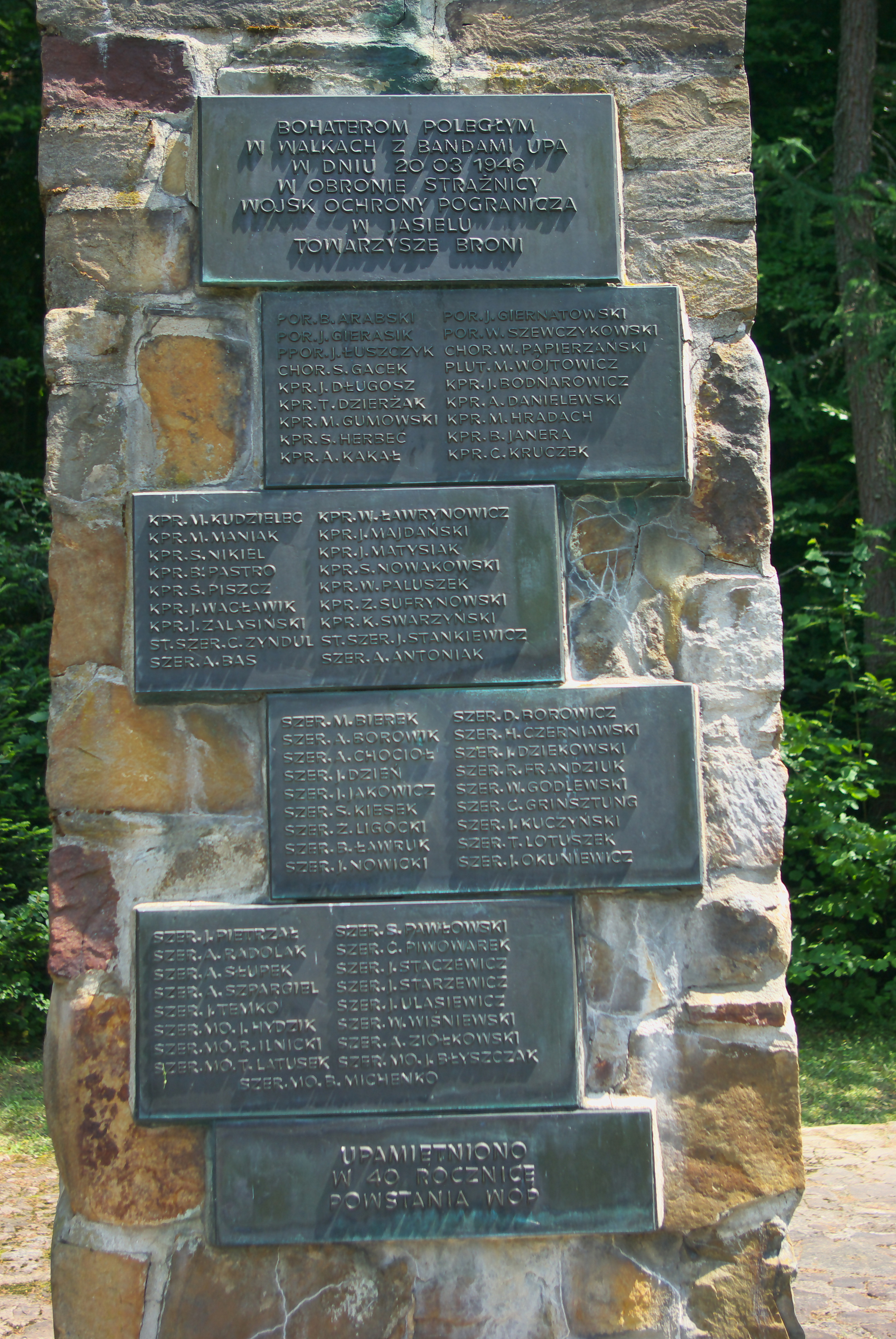
Monument to victims of Jasiel massacre in Jasiel

== See also ==
- Jasiel Rivero (born 1993), Cuban basketball player for Maccabi Tel Aviv in the Israeli Basketball Premier League
