= Gmina Komańcza =

Gmina Komańcza Komańcza Commune
- Gmina
- Flag Coat of arms
- Interactive map of Gmina Komańcza
- Coordinates (Komańcza): 49°21′N 22°4′E
- Country: Poland
- Voivodeship: Subcarpathian
- County: Sanok
- Seat: Komańcza

Area
  - Total: 387.95 km^{2} (149.79 sq mi)

Population (2006)
  - Total: 5,116
  - Density: 13.19/km^{2} (34.15/sq mi)
- Website: http://www.komancza.regiony.pl

Gmina Komańcza is a rural gmina (administrative district) in Sanok County, Subcarpathian Voivodeship, in south-eastern Poland, on the Slovak border. Its seat is the village of Komańcza, which lies approximately 25 kilometres (16 mi) south-west of Sanok and 76 km (47 mi) south of the regional capital Rzeszów.

The gmina covers an area of 455.18 square kilometres (175.7 sq mi), and as of 2006 its total population is 5,116. Ethnically the region's inhabitants include Poles, Pogorzans and Lemkos.

The gmina contains part of the protected area called Cisna-Wetlina Landscape Park.

== Villages ==
Gmina Komańcza contains the villages and settlements of Balnica, Banniczka, Czystogarb, Darów, Dołżyca, Duszatyn, Jasiel, Jawornik, Komańcza, Kulaszne, Łupków, Maniów, Mików, Moszczaniec, Nowy Łupków, Osławica, Polany Surowiczne, Prełuki, Radoszyce, Rzepedź, Smolnik, Surowica, Szczawne, Turzańsk, Wisłok Wielki, Wola Michowa, Wysoczany and Zawadka Morochowska.

== Neighbouring gminas ==
Gmina Komańcza is bordered by the gminas of Baligród, Bukowsko, Cisna, Jaśliska, Rymanów and Zagórz. It also borders Slovakia.

== Rural landscape pictures ==
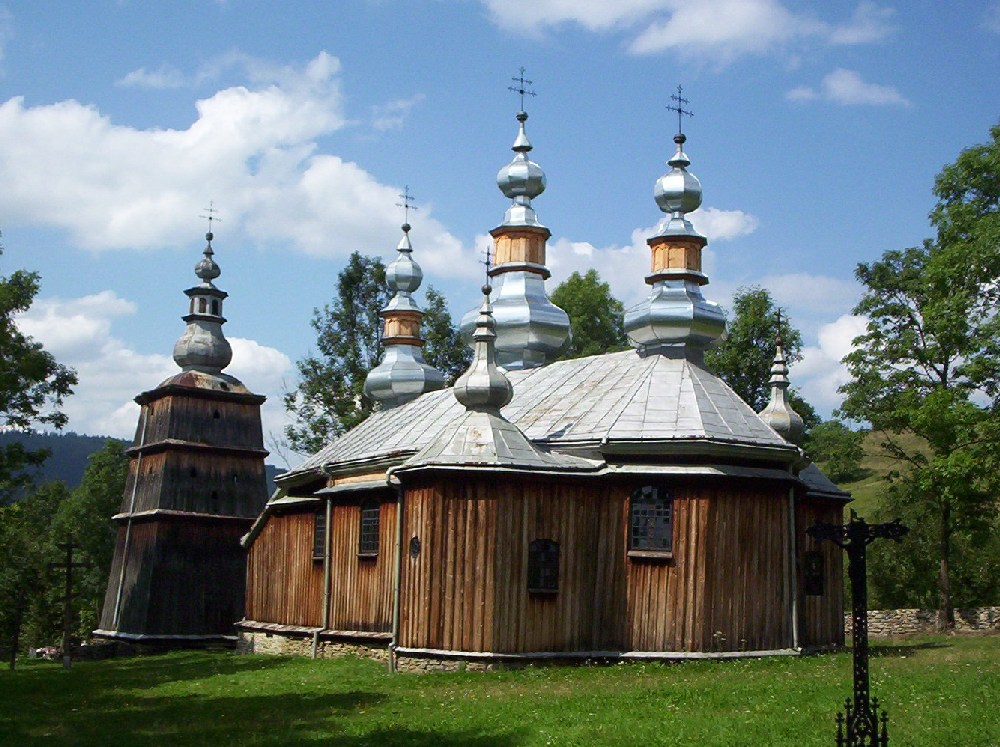

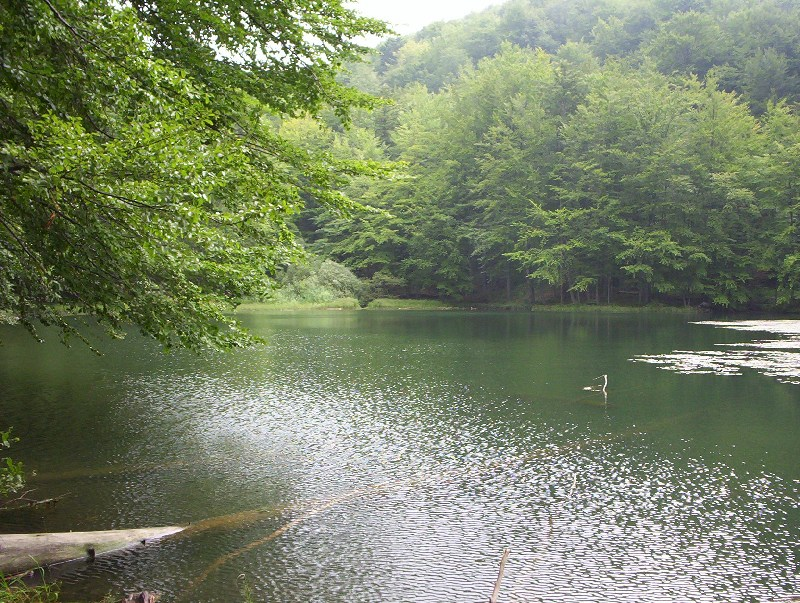

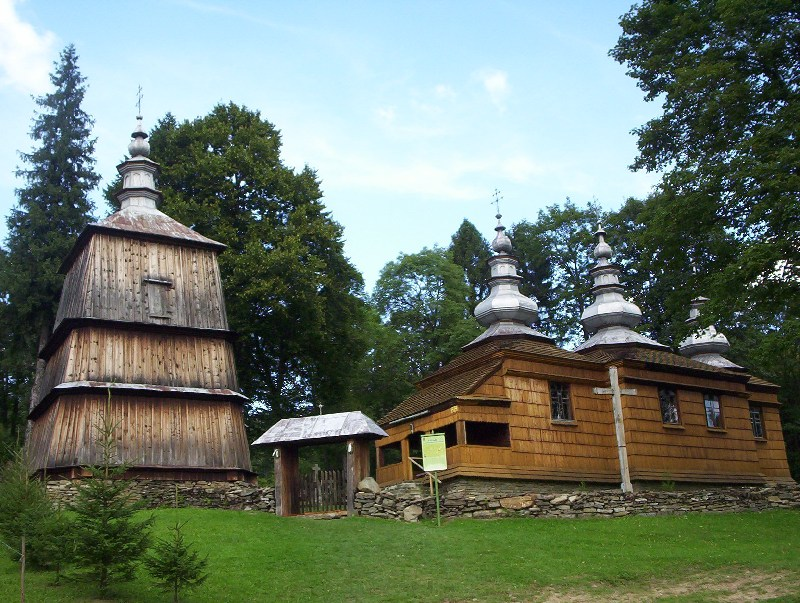

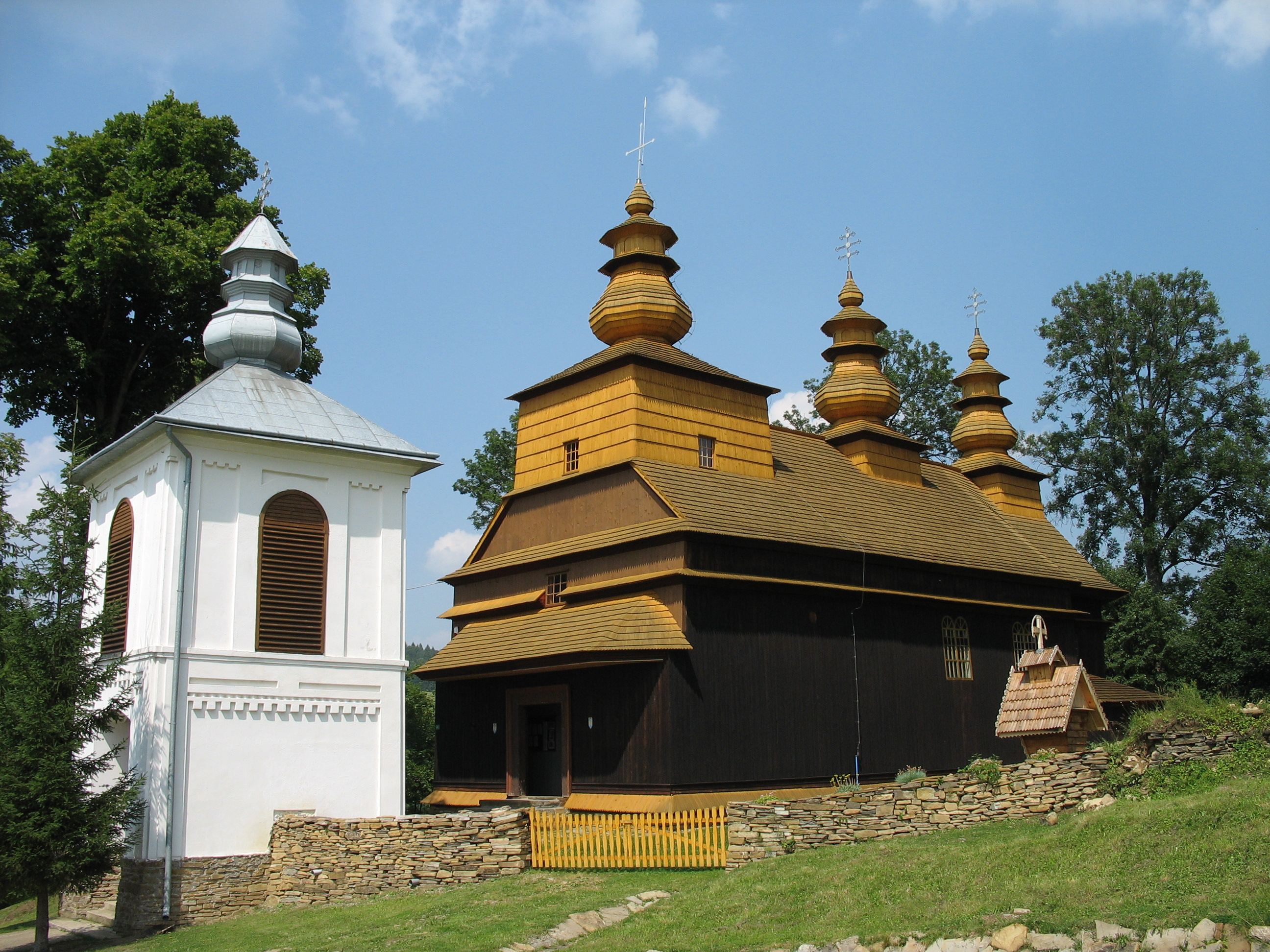

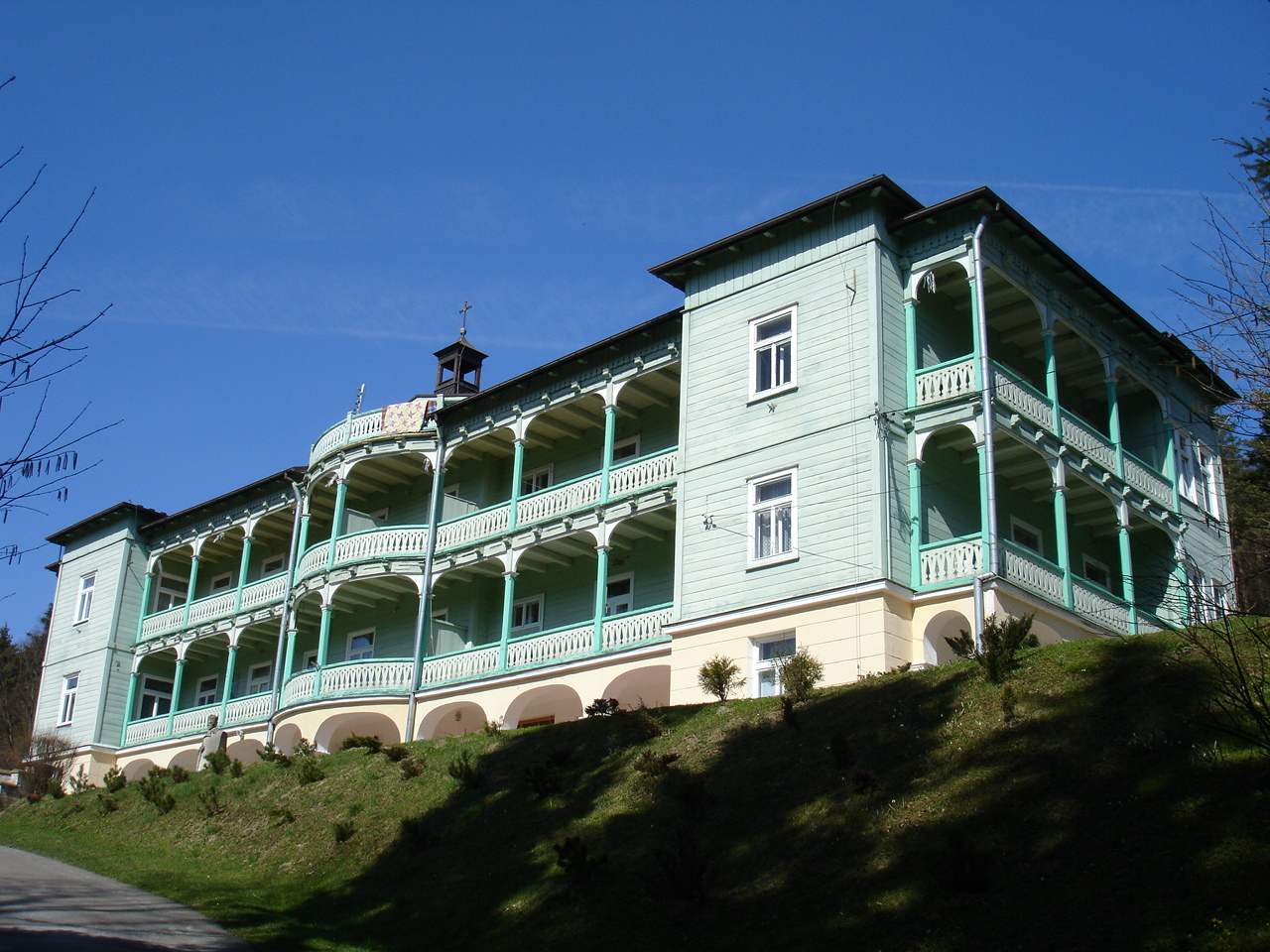

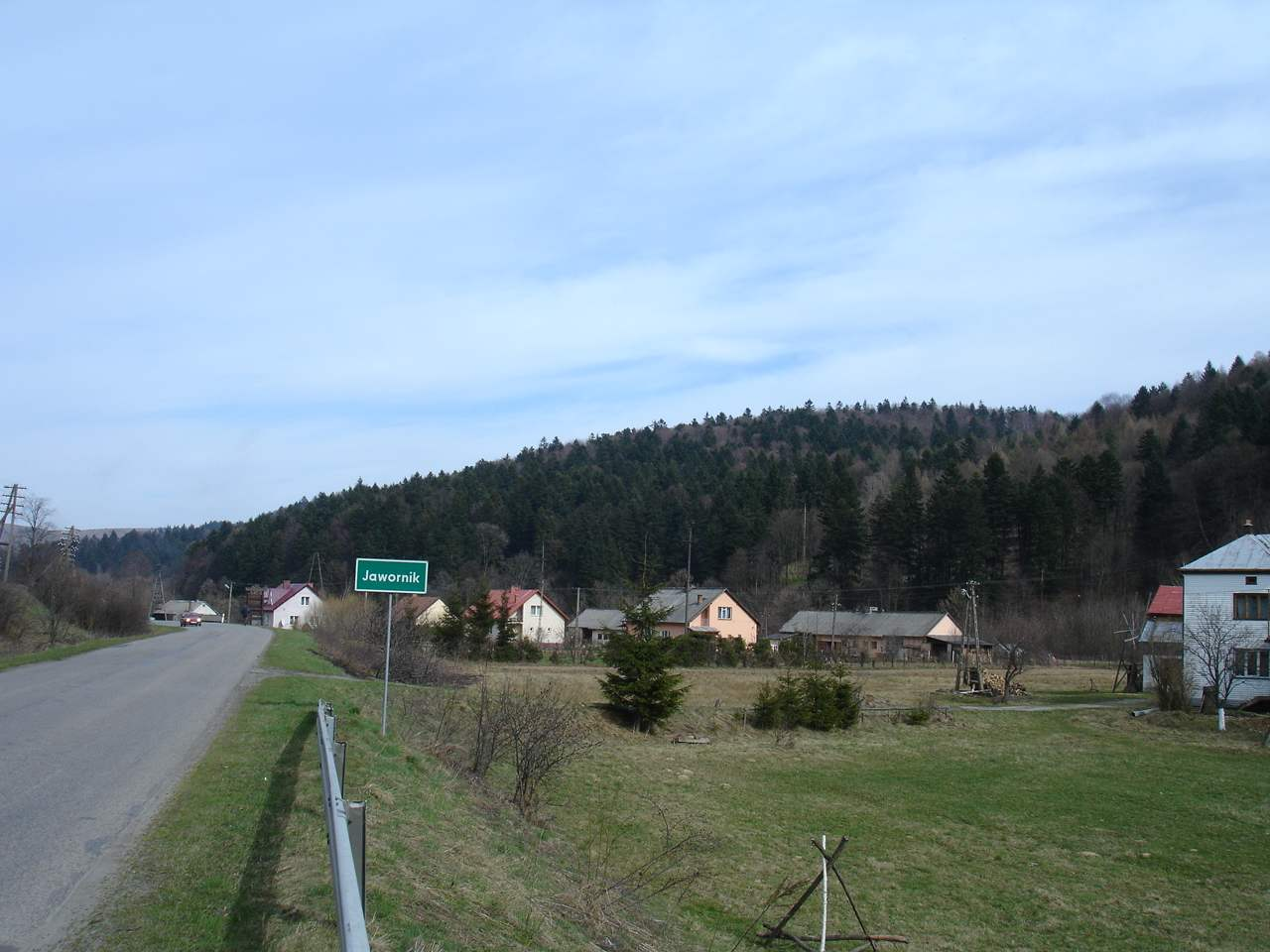

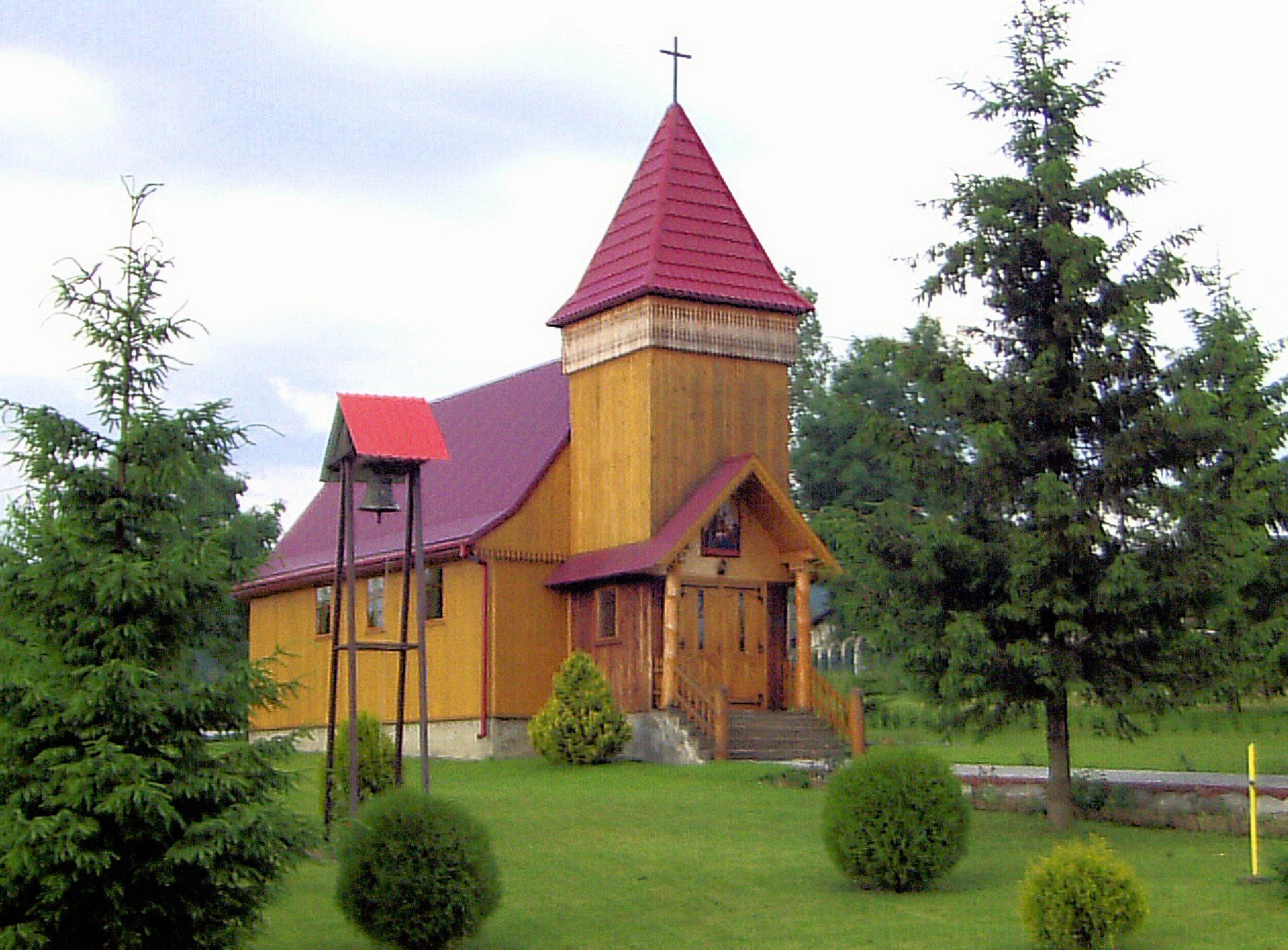
