= Surowica, Podkarpackie Voivodeship =

Lemko village in Poland

Surowica Суровиця
- Village
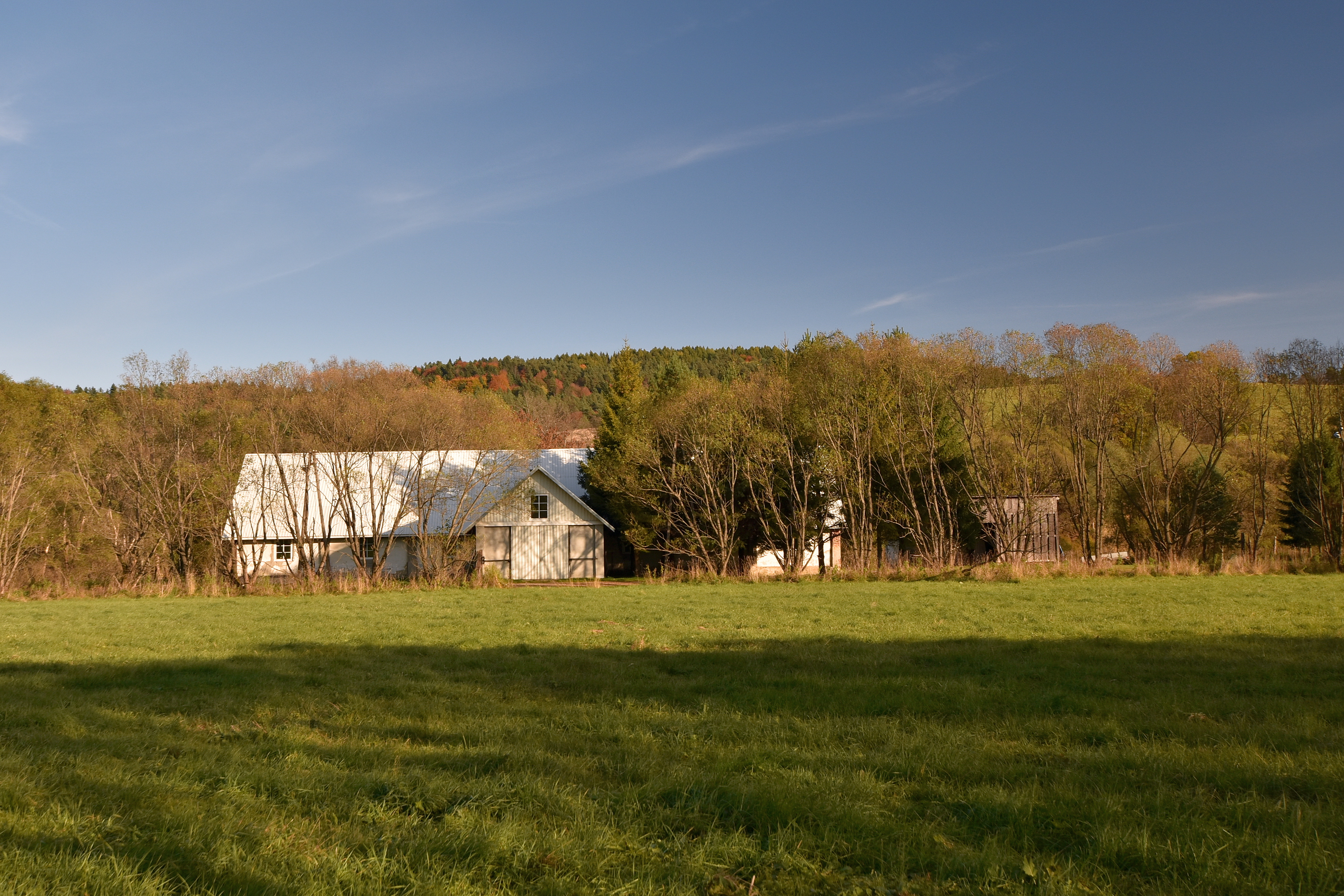

- Location within Poland
- Coordinates: 49°26′22″N 21°54′30″E
- Country: Poland
- Voivodeship: Subcarpathian
- County: Sanok
- Gmina: Komańcza
- Elevation: 438 m (1,437 ft)

Surowica [surɔˈvʲit͡sa] is a village in the administrative district of Gmina Komańcza, within Sanok County, Subcarpathian Voivodeship, in south-eastern Poland, close to the border with Slovakia.
