= Jawornik, Sanok County =

Lemko village in Poland

Jawornik Явірник
- Village
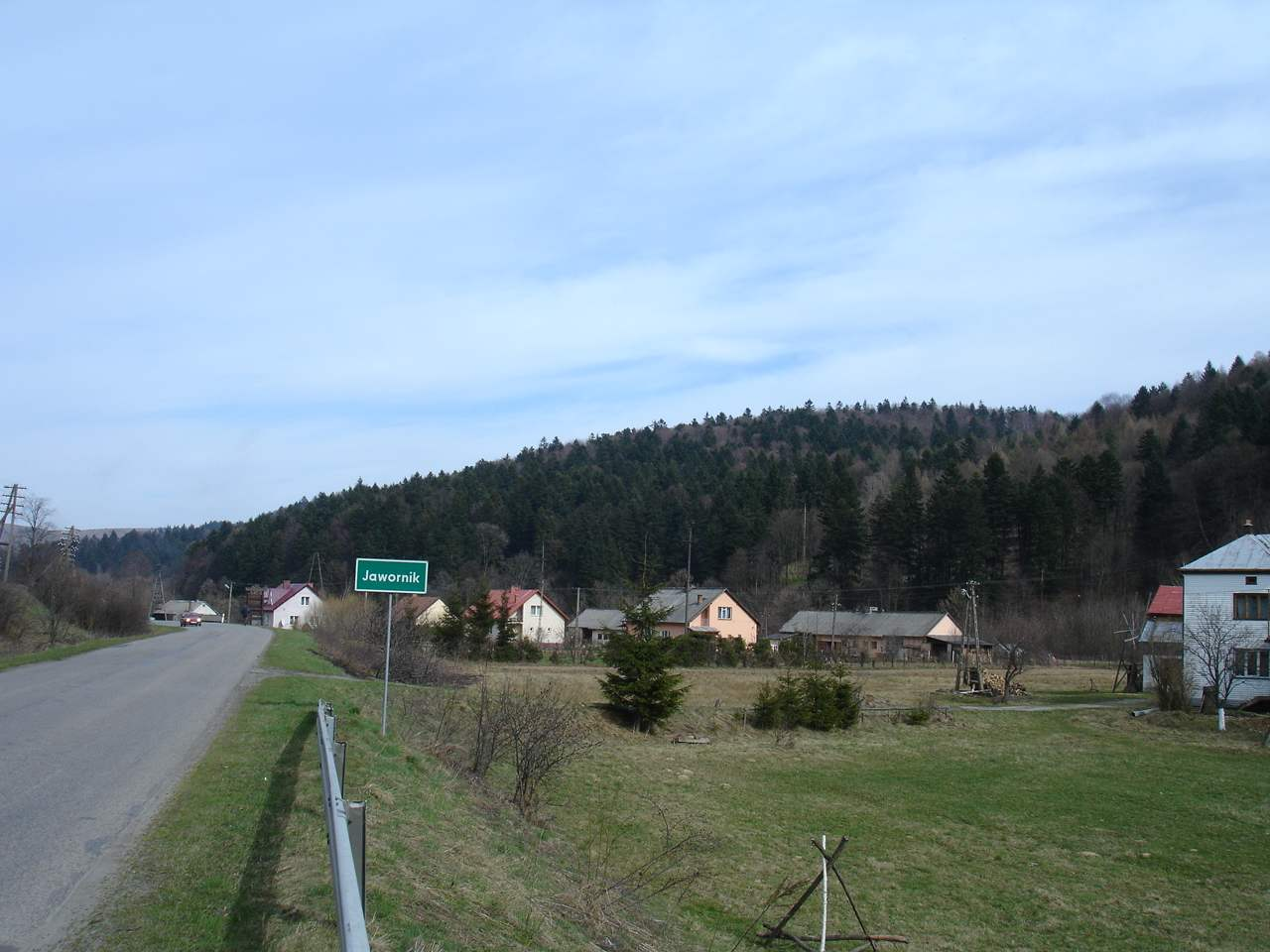

- Location within Poland
- Coordinates: 49°21′31″N 22°5′51″E
- Country: Poland
- Voivodeship: Subcarpathian
- County: Sanok
- Gmina: Komańcza

Jawornik [jaˈvɔrɲik] is a village in the administrative district of Gmina Komańcza, within Sanok County, Subcarpathian Voivodeship, in south-eastern Poland, close to the border with Slovakia.
