= Jasiel massacre =

1946 massacre

Jasiel Massacre
- Part of Polish–Ukrainian conflict (1939–1947)
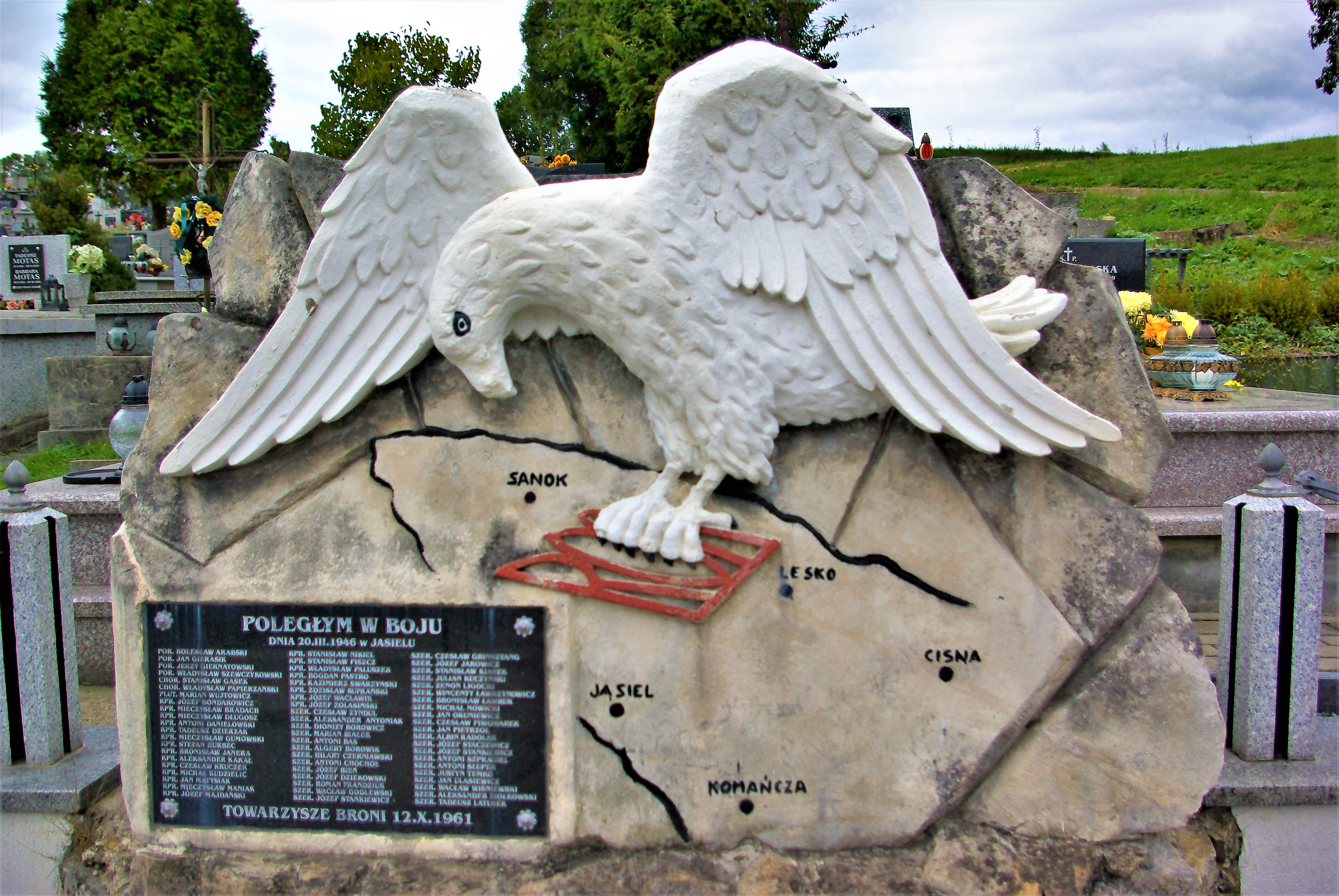
- A mass grave in which the victims of the massacre were buried
- Location: Jasiel, Poland
- Date: March 20, 1946
- Target: Polish POWs
- Attack type: Mass murder
- Deaths: 64–66
- Perpetrator: Ukrainian Insurgent Army

The Jasiel Massacre was committed on March 20, 1946 by Ukrainian Insurgent Army partisans on Polish soldiers of the Border Protection troops and officers of the Citizens' Militia in Jasiel.

== Prelude ==
On 11 March, Jasiel had a large UPA presence, but it was possible to supply a Polish outpost located there. On 16 March, Second Lt. Wiesław Zebrzycki, leading his patrol out of Jasiel, was killed in UPA ambush. The situation was getting out of control as the UPA presence grew. On 17 March, commanders begun to ask for evacuation of Jasiel outpost as the UPA presence reached dangerous levels.

== Battle and Massacre ==
Battle of Jasiel
- Part of the Polish–Ukrainian conflict
Date	20 March 1946
Location	Jasiel, Subcarpathian Voivodeship
Result	Ukrainian victory

Belligerents
Ukrainian Insurgent Army	People's Republic of Poland

Commanders and leaders
Unknown	Jan Gierasik

Units involved
"Khrin" sotnia "Myron" sotnia	Border Protection Forces; Citizens' Militia

Strength
1,000	100

Casualties and losses
Unknown	2 killed 80–94 captured

=== Battle ===
Before the massacre took place, a battle occurred between the UPA partisans and a Polish unit sent to rescue another unit stuck at Jasiel outpost. About 70 troops were sent to rescue 30 Polish soldiers in Jasiel. They reached it on 19 March. The Polish troops begun leaving on 20 March, but were ambushed by around 1,000 UPA partisans who opened heavy fire on them when Polish troops stopped in the village. They were ambushed by the UPA "Khrin" and "Myron" sotnias. The fighting lasted for an hour and Polish forces eventually ran out of ammunition. Unable to continue resistance, Polish soldiers were forced to surrender. As a result, 2 Polish soldiers were killed, dozen were wounded and the rest were captured. However, 3 people, including 1 officer, managed to make their way to Czechoslovakia.

=== Massacre ===
The Polish defeat in battle resulted in many Polish soldiers being taken captive. UPA partisans released 20 soldiers, while the remaining soldiers were vetted, selecting those who were active in fighting against UPA and those with Soviet awards. This battle was among UPA's greatest successes.

The executions were carried out in two locations: the officers were killed near the forester’s lodge in Moszczaniec, while the noncommissioned officers and privates on a hill near Wisłok Górny. A witness, Private Paweł Sudnik, managed to escape: “They ordered everyone to lie face down in the snow. […] They threw the first soldier to the bottom of the pit, and one of them shot him in the back of the head, taking his life.”

The attack and execution were carried out jointly by UPA sotnias commanded by Stepan Stebelski, pseudonym "Khrin", and Volodymyr Hoshko, pseudonym "Myron". 60 soldiers and 4 policemen were killed in the massacre; according to other sources, 66 soldiers were killed. Some of the bodies of executed soldiers were exhumed the same year and buried in Zagórz.

== Aftermath ==
The next day after the incidents in Jasiel, the Ukrainians attacked the border outpost in Jaśliska, located further to the northwest. However, multiple assaults were repelled by strong defensive fire. The Banderites retreated eastward. They did not attack the outpost again.

In 1947, durning Operation Vistula, ukrainian population was deported and village was destroyed.

== Bibliography ==
- Motyka, Grzegorz (2022). From the Volhynian Massacre to Operation Vistula. Brill U Schoningh. ISBN 978-3506795373.
