= Podkarpackie Voivodeship =

Voivodeship of Poland

Podkarpackie Voivodeship Województwo podkarpackie
- Voivodeship
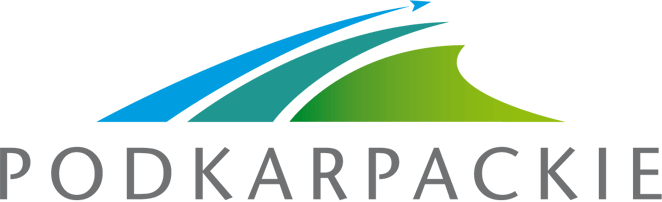
- Flag Coat of arms Brandmark

- Location within Poland

- Administrative map
- Coordinates (Rzeszów): 50°2′1″N 22°0′17″E; Voivodeship: 49°57′24″N 22°10′22″E
- Country: Poland
- Capital: Rzeszów
- Counties: 4 cities, 21 land counties*: Krosno; Przemyśl; Rzeszów; Tarnobrzeg; Bieszczady County; Brzozów County; Dębica County; Jarosław County; Jasło County; Kolbuszowa County; Krosno County; Łańcut County; Lesko County; Leżajsk County; Lubaczów County; Mielec County; Nisko County; Przemyśl County; Przeworsk County; Ropczyce-Sędziszów County; Rzeszów County; Sanok County; Stalowa Wola County; Strzyżów County; Tarnobrzeg County

Government
  - Body: Subcarpathian Voivodeship executive board
  - Voivode: Teresa Kubas-Hul (PO)
  - Marshal: Władysław Ortyl (PiS)
  - EP: Subcarpathian

Area
  - Total: 17,844 km^{2} (6,890 sq mi)

Population (2019)
  - Total: 2,127,462
  - Density: 119.23/km^{2} (308.79/sq mi)
  - Urban: 880,947
  - Rural: 1,246,515

GDP
  - Total: €32.683 billion (2024)
  - Per capita: €16,786 (2024)
- Time zone: UTC+1 (CET)
  - Summer (DST): UTC+2 (CEST)
- ISO 3166 code: PL-18
- Vehicle registration: R
- HDI (2023): 0.883 very high · 9th
- Primary airport: Rzeszów–Jasionka Airport
- Website: rzeszow.uw.gov.pl
- *Further divided into 160 gminas

Podkarpackie Voivodeship (Polish pronunciation: [pɔt.karˈpat͡s.kjɛ]; lit. 'Subcarpathian') is a voivodeship, or province, in the southeastern corner of Poland. Its administrative capital and largest city is Rzeszów. It is governed by the Subcarpathian Regional Assembly and the voivodeship marshal.

The name derives from the region's location near the Carpathian Mountains, and the voivodeship comprises areas of two historic regions of Central Europe—Lesser Poland (western and northwestern counties) and Cherven Cities/Red Ruthenia.

It is bordered by Lesser Poland Voivodeship to the west, Świętokrzyskie Voivodeship to the north-west, Lublin Voivodeship to the north, Ukraine (Lviv Oblast and Zakarpattia Oblast) to the east and Slovakia (Prešov Region) to the south. It covers an area of 17,844 square kilometres (6,890 sq mi), and has a population of 2,627,462 (as at 2019). The voivodeship is mostly hilly or mountainous (see Bieszczady, Beskidy); its northwestern corner is flat. It is one of the most wooded Polish voivodeships (35.9% of total area), within its borders is the entirety of Bieszczady National Park, and parts of Magura National Park.

== History ==
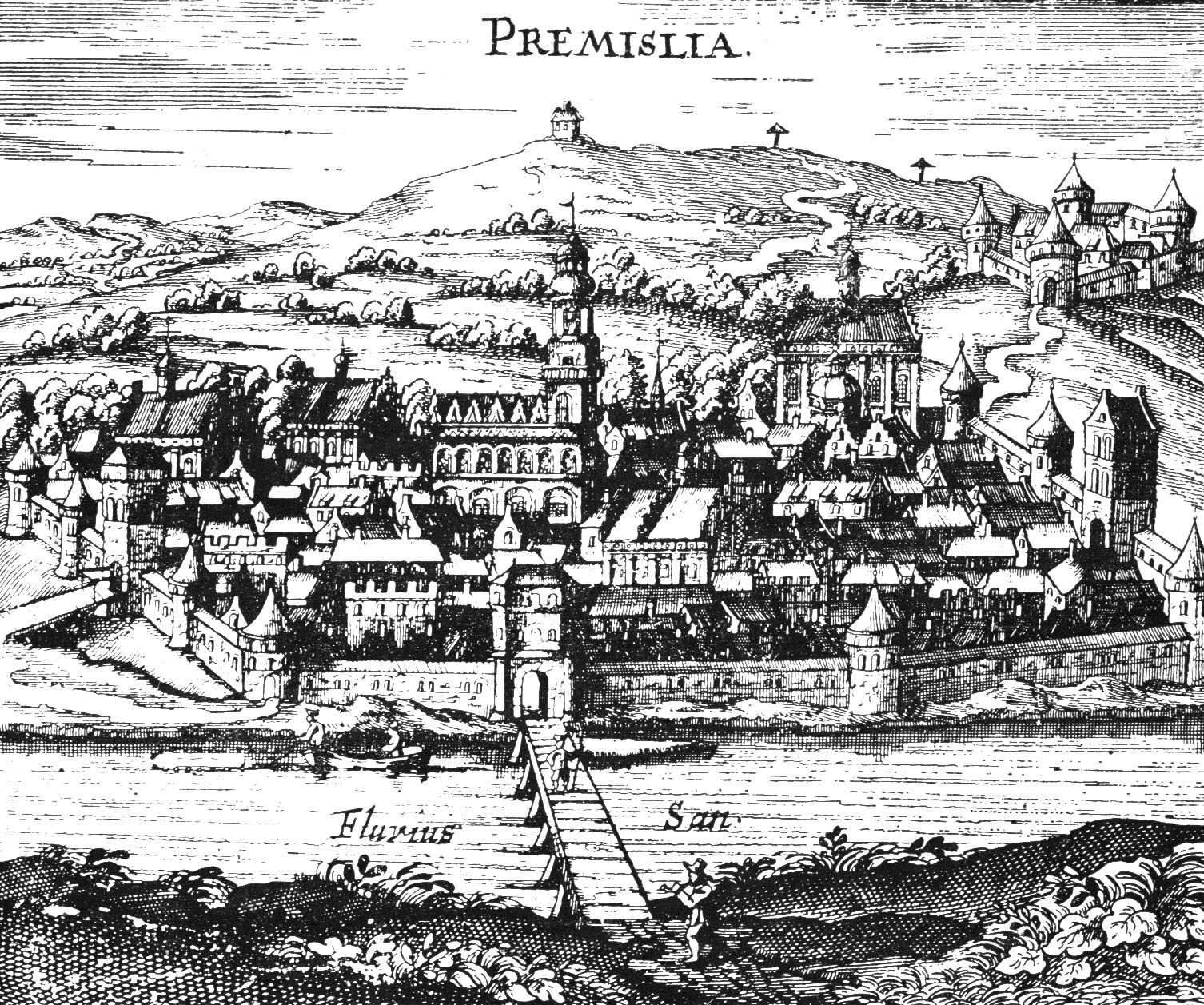
17th-century view of Przemyśl, one of the oldest and for several centuries the largest city of the region

In the Early Middle Ages, the territory was inhabited by the Vistulans and Lendians, old Polish tribes. It formed part of Poland since its first ever historic ruler Mieszko I, however, later on, at various times, portions of the region fell under the Kievan Rus', the Golden Horde, and the Kingdom of Hungary, before Poland regained full control in the 14th century. Following the Partitions of Poland the entire region was annexed by Austria and included within the newly established Kingdom of Galicia and Lodomeria. The oldest cities in the province, with over 1,000 years of history, are Przemyśl and Sanok. Rzeszów, Łańcut and Tarnobrzeg, with their castles and palaces, were important residential cities of the powerful Polish magnate families of Lubomirski, Potocki and Tarnowski.

During the interwar period (1918–1939), territory of the Subcarpathian Voivodeship was part of the Lwów Voivodeship and belonged to "Poland B", the less-developed, more rural parts of Poland. To boost the local economy, the government of the Second Polish Republic began in the mid-1930s a massive program of industrialization, known as the Central Industrial Region. The program created several major armament factories, including PZL Mielec, PZL Rzeszów, Huta Stalowa Wola, and factories in other Subcarpathian towns such as Dębica, Nowa Dęba, Sanok, Tarnobrzeg and Nowa Sarzyna.

Following the joint German–Soviet invasion of Poland, which started World War II in September 1939, most of the current province was occupied by Nazi Germany with the eastern outskirts occupied by the Soviet Union, and the city of Przemyśl divided between the occupiers until 1941, and then the entire region occupied by Germany until 1944.

Following the Soviet annexation of the regional capital of Lwów, Rzeszów was chosen as the new regional capital and the Rzeszów Voivodeship was founded.

The voivodeship was created on 1 January 1999 out of the former Rzeszów, Przemyśl, Krosno and (partially) Tarnów and Tarnobrzeg Voivodeships, pursuant to the Polish local-government reforms adopted in 1998.

== Government ==
Subcarpathian Voivodeship's government powers are shared between the voivode (governor), the sejmik (regional assembly), and the marshal.

== Cities and towns ==
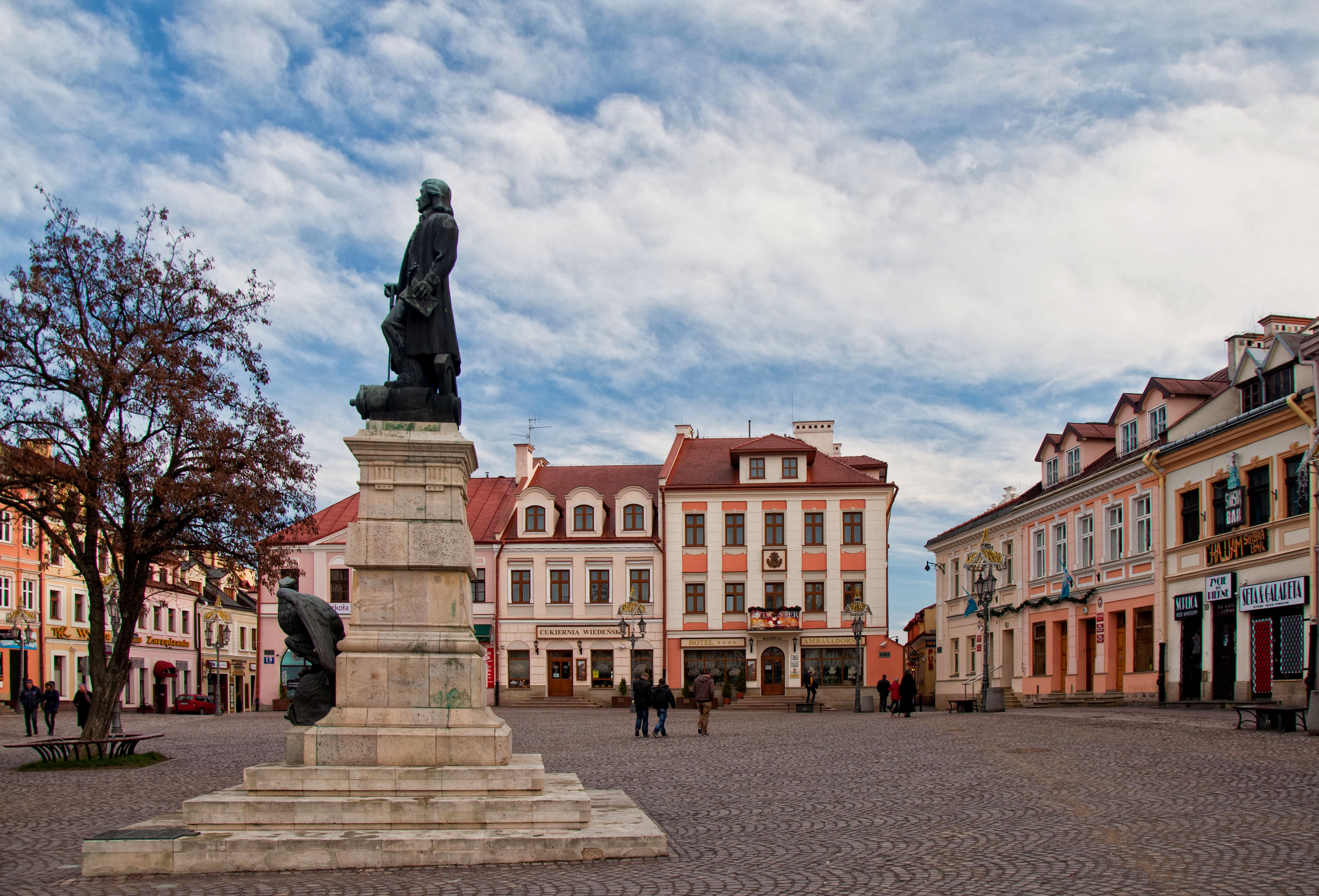
Rzeszów, capital and largest city of the voivodeship

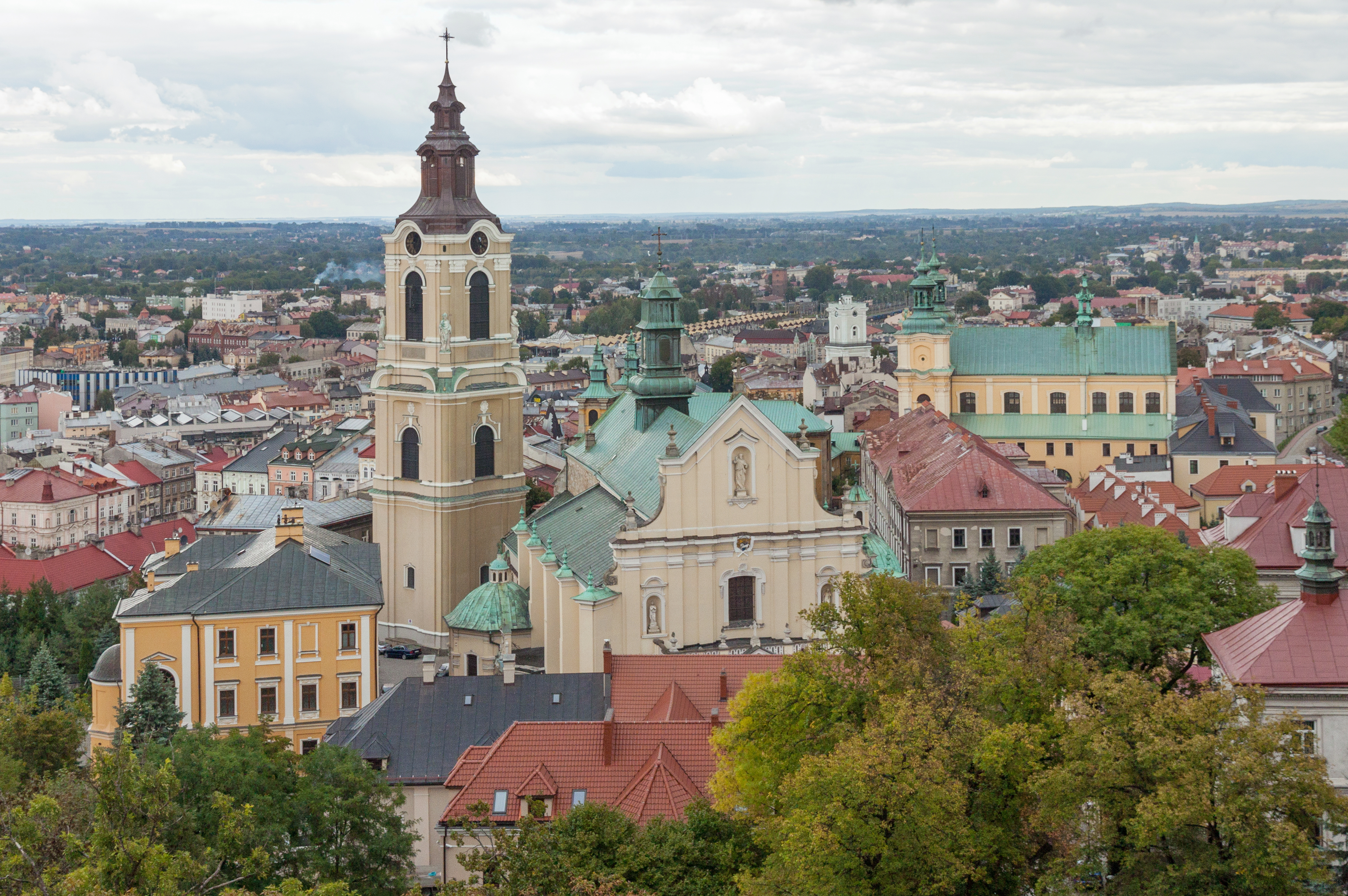
Przemyśl, largest city in the eastern part of the voivodeship, whose Old Town is designated a Historic Monument of Poland

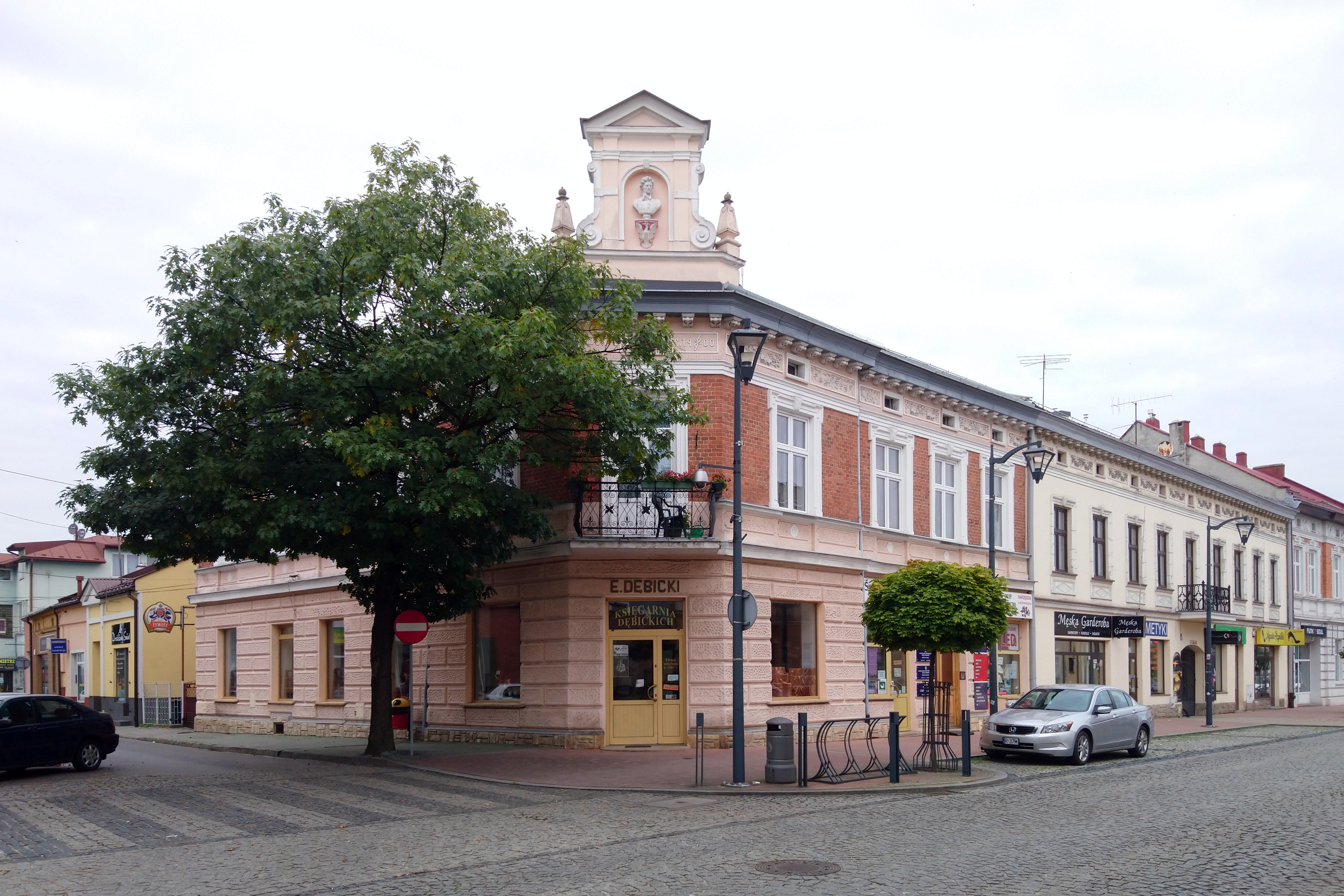
Mielec, center of aviation industry

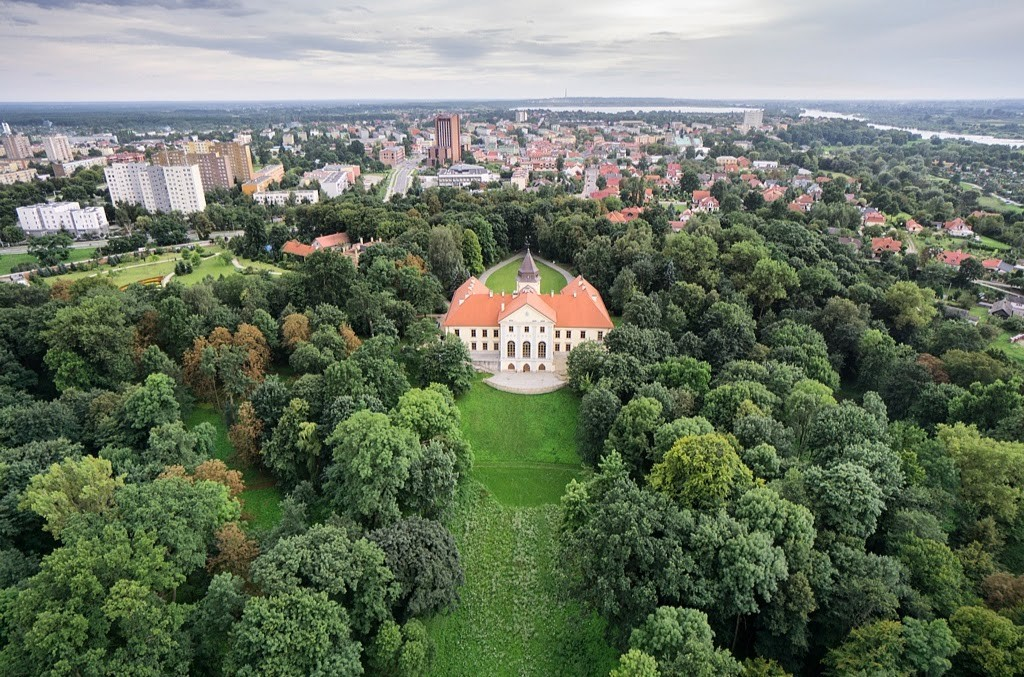
Tarnobrzeg, major center for sulfur mining and processing

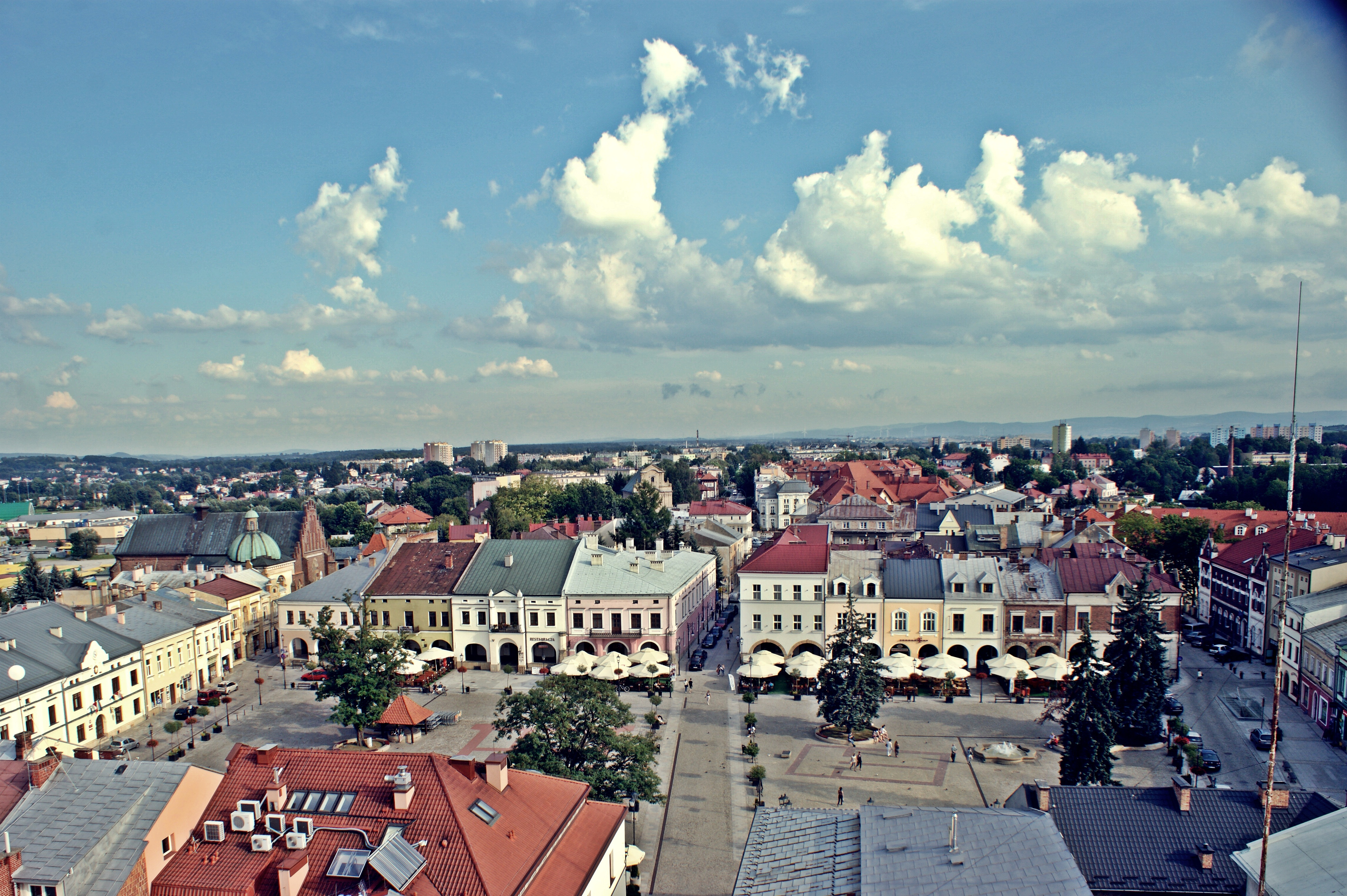
Krosno, historic royal city, nicknamed "Little Kraków"

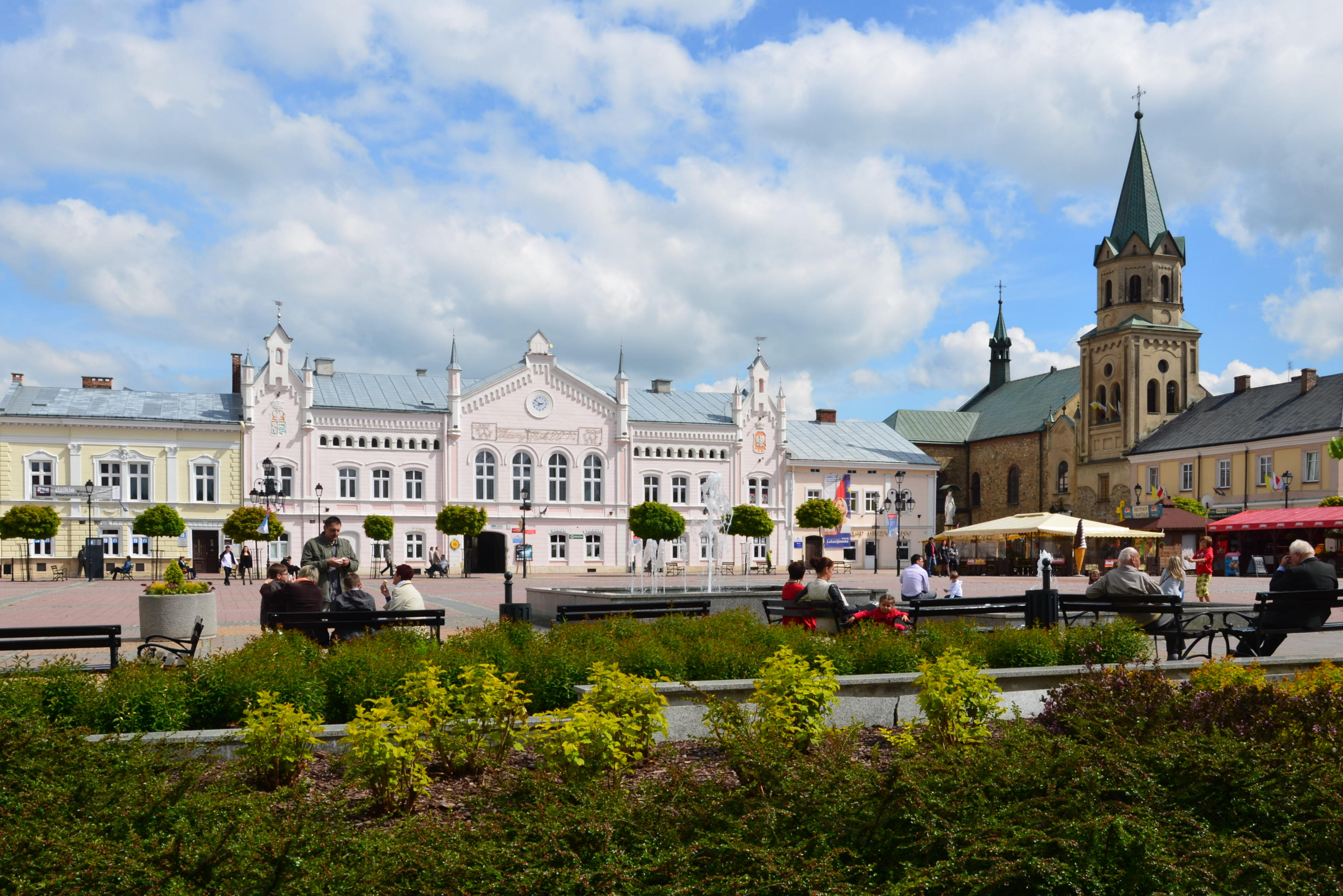
Sanok, historic royal town, one of the oldest towns in the voivodeship

The voivodeship contains 6 cities and 49 towns. These are listed below in descending order of population (according to official figures as of 2019)

Cities (governed by a city mayor or prezydent miasta):
1. Rzeszów (194,886)
2. Przemyśl (60,999)
3. Stalowa Wola (60,799)
4. Mielec (60,366)
5. Tarnobrzeg (46,907)
6. Krosno (46,369)

Towns:

1. Dębica (45,634)
2. Jarosław (37,585)
3. Sanok (37,381)
4. Jasło (35,063)
5. Łańcut (17,709)
6. Ropczyce (15,836)
7. Przeworsk (15,356)
8. Nisko (15,324)
9. Leżajsk (13,853)
10. Sędziszów Małopolski (12,357)
11. Lubaczów (12,018)
12. Nowa Dęba (11,152)
13. Ustrzyki Dolne (9,097)
14. Kolbuszowa (9,075)
15. Strzyżów (8,884)
16. Brzozów (7,463)
17. Rudnik nad Sanem (6,710)
18. Głogów Małopolski (6,654)
19. Boguchwała (6,179)
20. Dynów (6,129)
21. Nowa Sarzyna (5,834)
22. Jedlicze (5,736)
23. Lesko (5,424)
24. Radymno (5,279)
25. Jodłowa (5,239)
26. Zagórz (5,095)
27. Pilzno (4,912)
28. Sokołów Małopolski (4,193)
29. Rymanów (3,825)
30. Tyczyn (3,824)
31. Pruchnik (3,764)
32. Radomyśl Wielki (3,231)
33. Kańczuga (3,167)
34. Zaklików (2,979)
35. Oleszyce (2,974)
36. Brzostek (2,752)
37. Sieniawa (2,140)
38. Błażowa (2,139)
39. Narol (2,109)
40. Dukla (2,061)
41. Cieszanów (1,913)
42. Iwonicz-Zdrój (1,787)
43. Przecław (1,775)
44. Baranów Sandomierski (1,456)
45. Ulanów (1,422)
46. Kołaczyce (1,409)
47. Jawornik Polski
48. Bircza
49. Dubiecko (866)

== Administrative divisions ==
Subcarpathian Voivodeship is divided into 25 counties (powiats): four city counties and 21 land counties. These are further divided into 160 gminas.

The counties are listed in the following table (ordering within categories is by decreasing population).

English and Polish names	Area		Population (2019)	Seat	Other towns	Total gminas
English and Polish names	km^{2}	sq mi	Population (2019)	Seat	Other towns	Total gminas
City counties
Rzeszów	77	30	194,886			1
Przemyśl	44	17	60,999			1
Tarnobrzeg	86	33	46,907			1
Krosno	43	17	46,369			1
Land counties
Rzeszów County powiat rzeszowski	471	182	168,614	Rzeszów *	Boguchwała, Głogów Małopolski, Sokołów Małopolski, Błażowa, Tyczyn	14
Mielec County powiat mielecki	880	340	136,591	Mielec	Radomyśl Wielki, Przecław	10
Dębica County powiat dębicki	776	300	135,348	Dębica	Pilzno, Brzostek	7
Jarosław County powiat jarosławski	1,029	397	120,462	Jarosław	Radymno, Pruchnik	11
Jasło County powiat jasielski	830	320	113,730	Jasło	Kołaczyce	10
Krosno County powiat krośnieński	924	357	112,301	Krosno *	Jedlicze, Rymanów, Dukla, Iwonicz-Zdrój	10
Stalowa Wola County powiat stalowowolski	833	322	106,272	Stalowa Wola	Zaklików	6
Sanok County powiat sanocki	1,225	473	94,473	Sanok	Zagórz	8
Łańcut County powiat łańcucki	452	175	80,898	Łańcut		7
Przeworsk County powiat przeworski	698	269	78,354	Przeworsk	Kańczuga, Sieniawa, Jawornik Polski	9
Ropczyce-Sędziszów County powiat ropczycko-sędziszowski	549	212	74,416	Ropczyce	Sędziszów Małopolski	5
Przemyśl County powiat przemyski	1,214	469	74,234	Przemyśl *	Dubiecko, Bircza	10
Leżajsk County powiat leżajski	583	225	69,479	Leżajsk	Nowa Sarzyna	5
Nisko County powiat niżański	786	303	66,699	Nisko	Rudnik nad Sanem, Ulanów	7
Brzozów County powiat brzozowski	540	210	65,652	Brzozów		6
Kolbuszowa County powiat kolbuszowski	774	299	62,389	Kolbuszowa		6
Strzyżów County powiat strzyżowski	503	194	61,505	Strzyżów		5
Lubaczów County powiat lubaczowski	1,308	505	55,438	Lubaczów	Oleszyce, Narol, Cieszanów	8
Tarnobrzeg County powiat tarnobrzeski	520	200	53,115	Tarnobrzeg *	Nowa Dęba, Baranów Sandomierski	4
Lesko County powiat leski	835	322	26,532	Lesko		5
Bieszczady County powiat bieszczadzki	1,138	439	21,799	Ustrzyki Dolne		3
* Seat not part of the county

== Protected areas ==
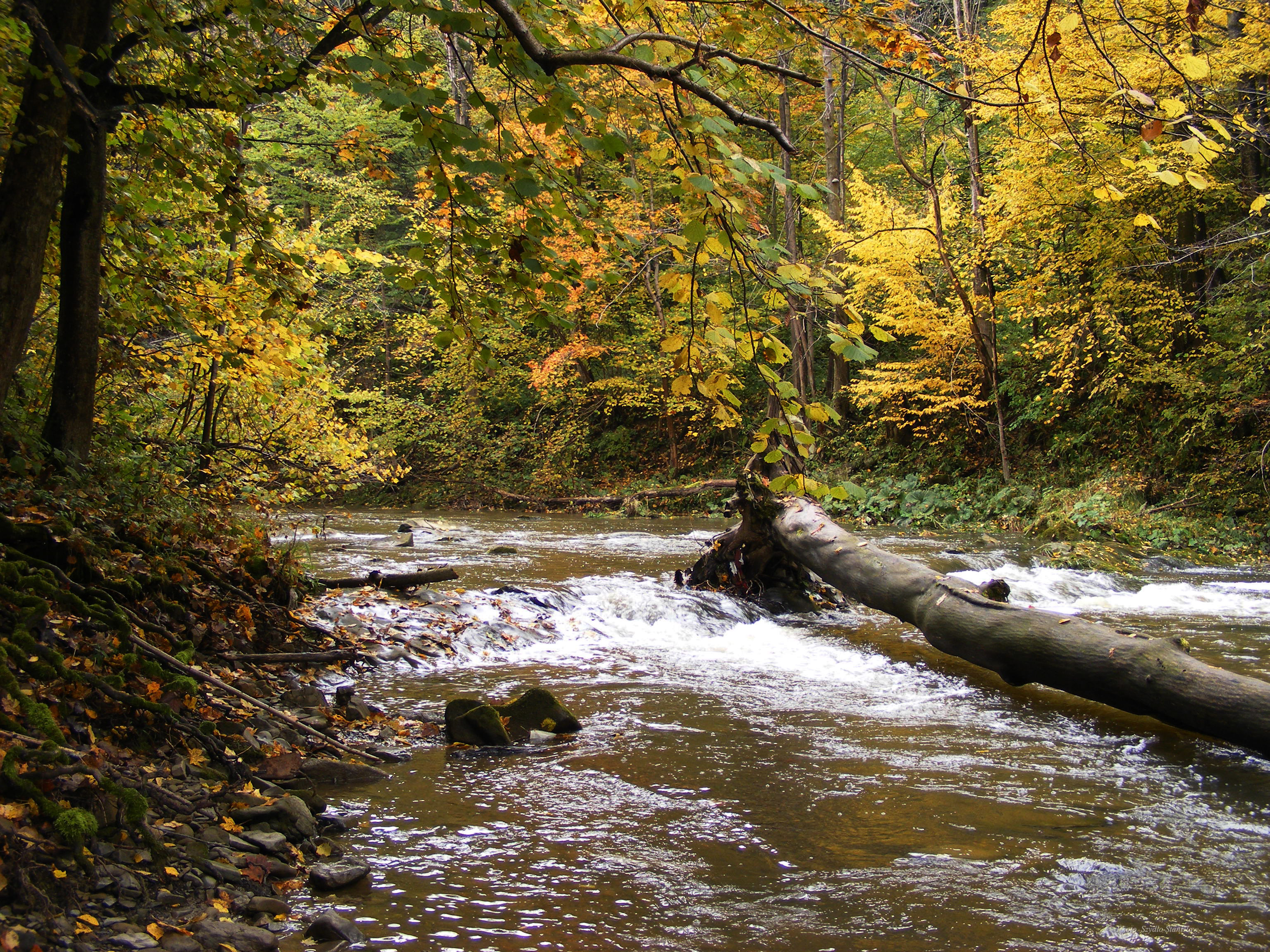
Jaśliski Landscape Park and Jasiołka River

Protected areas in Subcarpathian Voivodeship include two national parks and 11 Landscape Parks. These are listed below.

- Bieszczady National Park (part of the East Carpathian Biosphere Reserve)
- Magura National Park (partly in Lesser Poland Voivodeship)
- Cisna-Wetlina Landscape Park
- Czarnorzeki-Strzyżów Landscape Park
- Jaśliska Landscape Park
- Janów Forests Landscape Park (partly in Lublin Voivodeship)
- Pasmo Brzanki Landscape Park (partly in Lesser Poland Voivodeship)
- Pogórze Przemyskie Landscape Park
- Puszcza Solska Landscape Park (partly in Lublin Voivodeship)
- San Valley Landscape Park
- Słonne Mountains Landscape Park
- South Roztocze Landscape Park (partly in Lublin Voivodeship)

== Economy ==
The Gross domestic product (GDP) of the province was 19.4 billion euros in 2018, accounting for 3.9% of Polish economic output. GDP per capita adjusted for purchasing power was 15,100 euros or 50% of the EU27 average in the same year. The GDP per employee was 59% of the EU average. Podkarpackie Voivodship is the province with the third lowest GDP per capita in Poland.

== Transportation ==
The Rzeszów–Jasionka Airport is the province's international airport.

The A4 and S19 highways pass through the province, with the S74 also planned for construction.

== Demographics ==
Historical population
Year	Pop.	±%
1988	2,018,850	—
2002	2,103,837	+4.2%
2011	2,127,286	+1.1%
2021	2,093,360	−1.6%

Population according to 2002 census

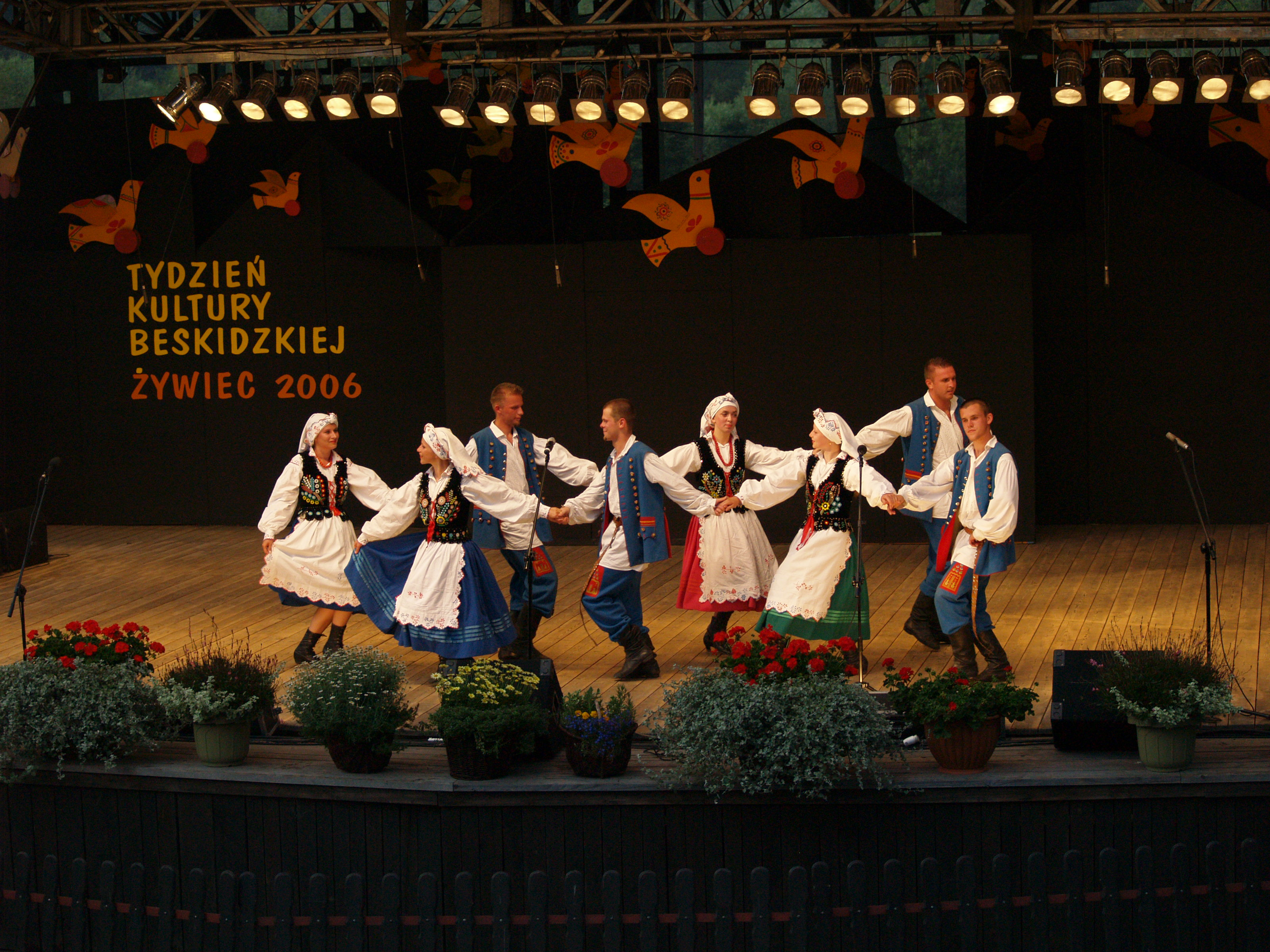
Regional costumes of the Pogorzans

- Poles – 2,079,208 (98.8%)
  - Pogorzans
- Ukrainians – 3,271 (0.2%)
  - Rusyns
    - Lemkos – 147
    - Boykos
- Romani people – 717
- Americans – 129
- Russians – 128
- Germans – 116
- Italians – 108
- No answer – 19,055 (0.9%)

=== Most popular surnames in the region ===
1. Mazur: 9,530
2. Nowak: 9,301
3. Baran: 8,020

== Sights and tourism ==
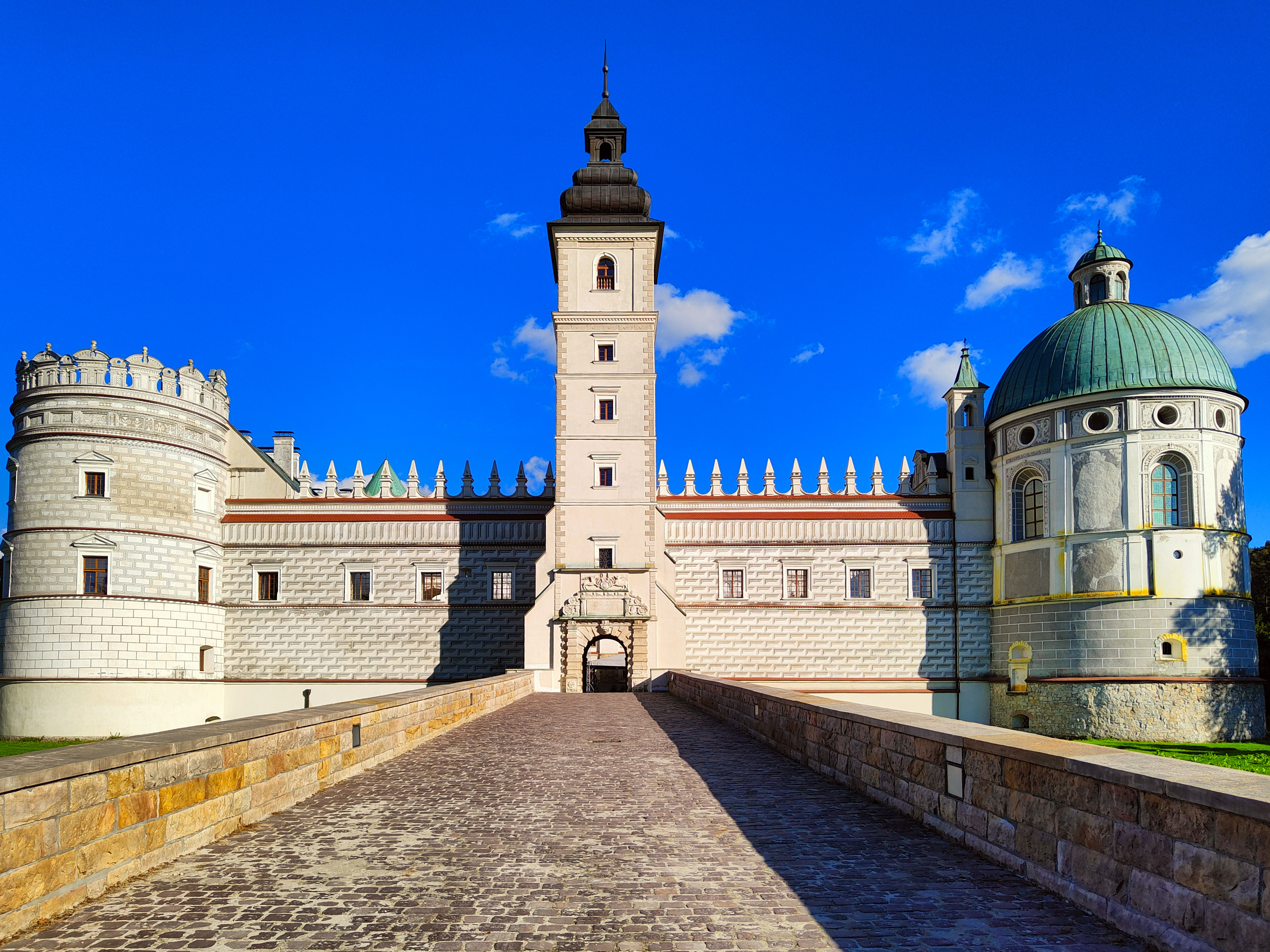
Krasiczyn Castle

There are three UNESCO World Heritage Sites in the voivodeship:

- Bieszczady National Park
- Wooden churches of Southern Lesser Poland (three within the province)
- Wooden Tserkvas of the Carpathian Region in Poland and Ukraine (four within the province)

There are seven Historic Monuments of Poland in the voivodeship:

- World's oldest oil field in Bóbrka
- Krasiczyn Castle
- Bernardine Monastery in Leżajsk with the famous Baroque pipe organs
- Łańcut Castle
- Old Town of Przemyśl
- Przemyśl Fortress
- St. Paraskevi Church, Radruż

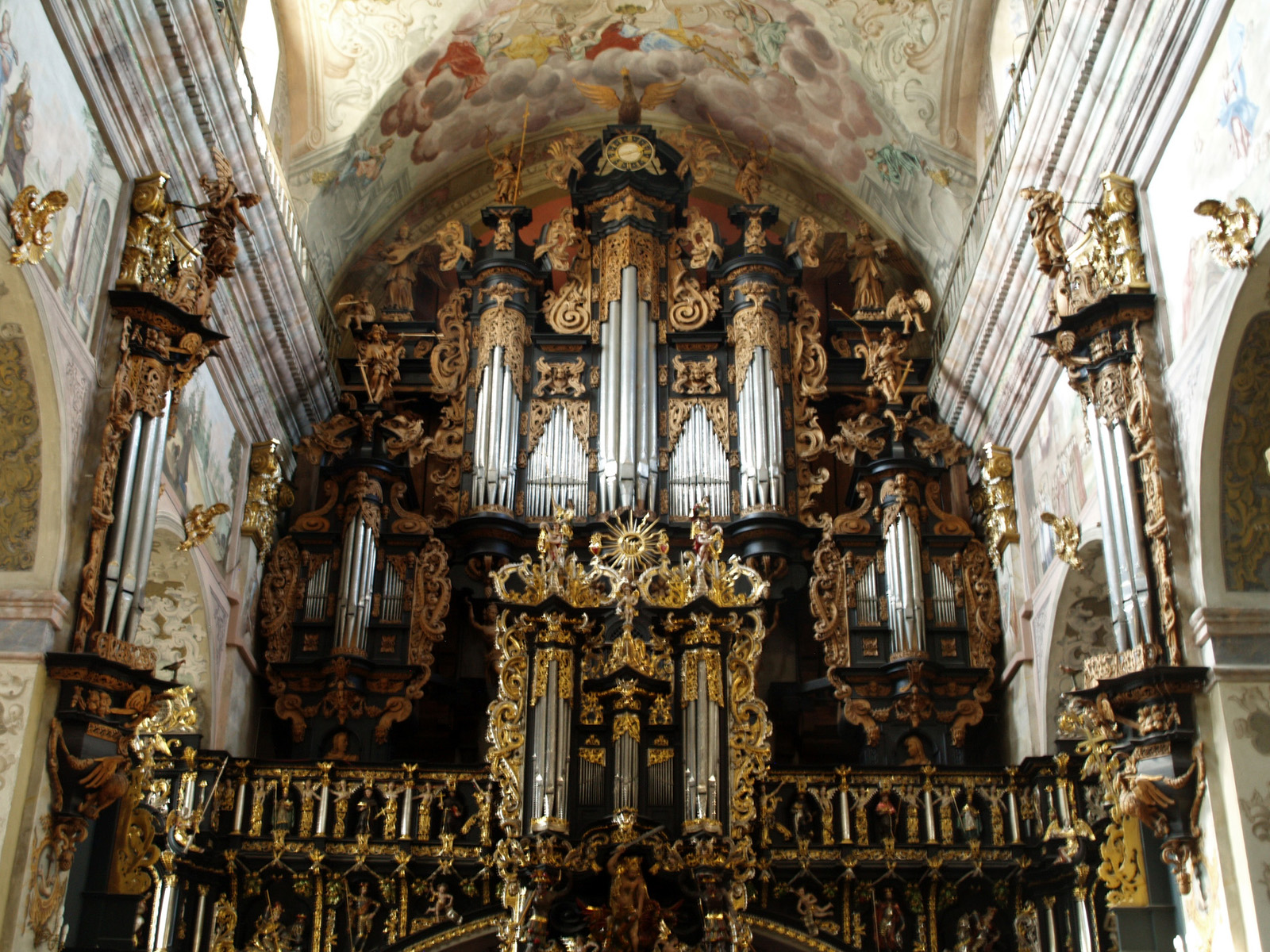
16th-century Baroque organs at the Bernardine Monastery in Leżajsk

Other preserved historic old towns include Krosno, nicknamed "Little Kraków", Jarosław, Rzeszów, Sanok. In Jarosław, Przemyśl and Rzeszów there are underground tourist routes in historic cellars under the old town market squares. There are numerous castles and palaces in the province, including the Royal Castles in Przemyśl and Sanok, and former noble castles and palaces in Baranów Sandomierski, Dukla, Rzeszów, Tarnobrzeg and Tyczyn.

There are five spa towns: Horyniec-Zdrój, Iwonicz-Zdrój, Polańczyk, Rymanów-Zdrój, Solina.

There are several museums, including the National Museum in Przemyśl and Regional Museum in Rzeszów. The more unique museums include the Museum of Folk Architecture in Sanok, Markowa Ulma-Family Museum of Poles Who Saved Jews in World War II, Museum of Oil and Gas Industry at the location of the world's oldest oil field in Bóbrka, and Museum of the Polish Sulfur Industry in Tarnobrzeg.

There are several monuments and memorials to inventor Ignacy Łukasiewicz, pioneer of the global oil industry, in places where he studied and worked, including Bóbrka, Krosno, Łańcut, Jasło and Rzeszów. There are memorials to the Hungarian Renaissance poet Bálint Balassi in Odrzykoń, Nowy Żmigród and Rymanów, where he stayed at various times.

== Cuisine ==
In addition to traditional nationwide Polish cuisine, Subcarpathian Voivodeship is known for its variety of regional and local traditional foods, which include especially various cheeses, meat products (incl. various types of kiełbasa, bacon and salceson), cakes, honeys and various dishes and meals, officially protected by the Ministry of Agriculture and Rural Development of Poland. There are local types of pierogi, gołąbki, barszcz and other soups.

== Sports ==
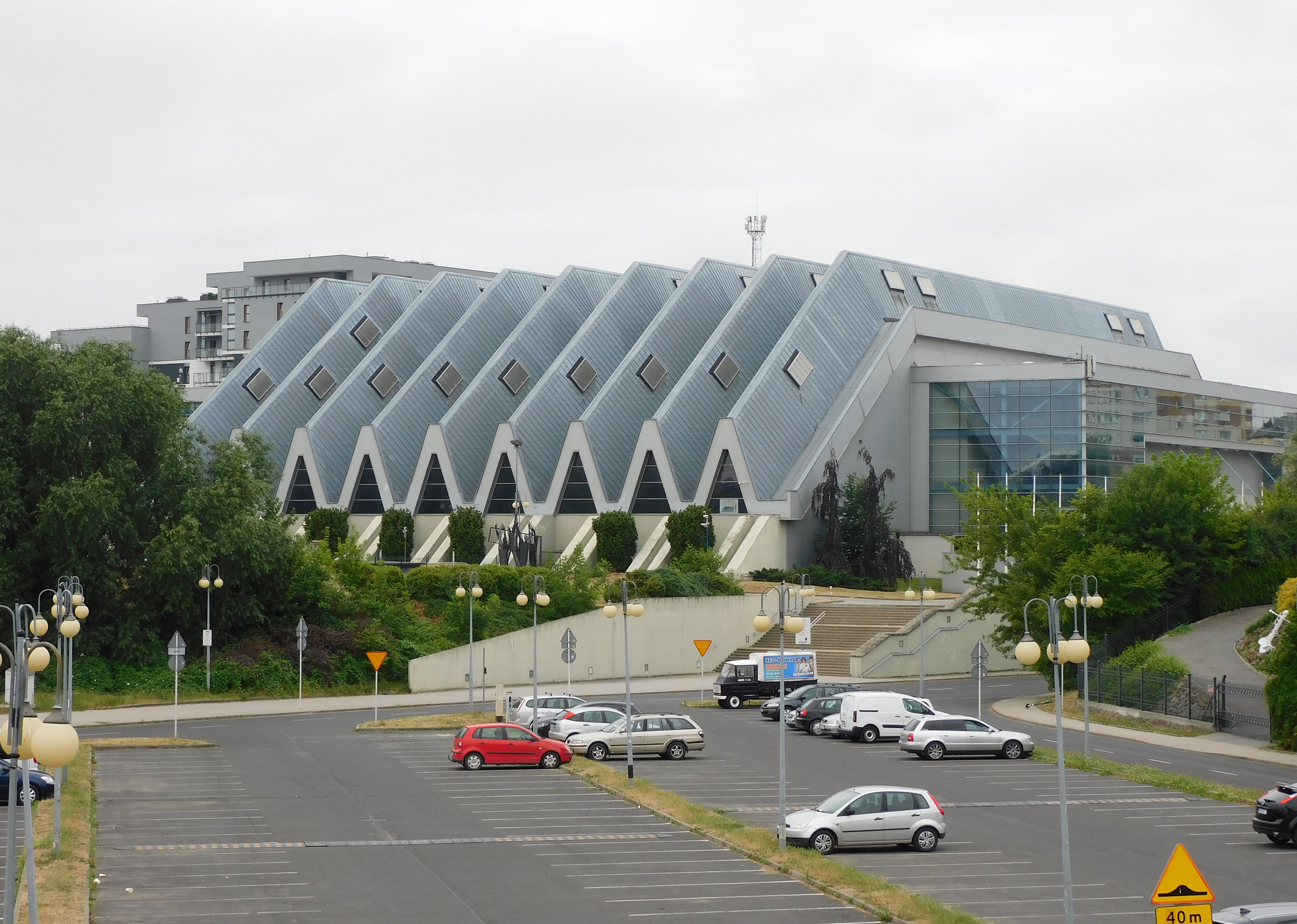
Hala Podpromie, home venue of Resovia volleyball team

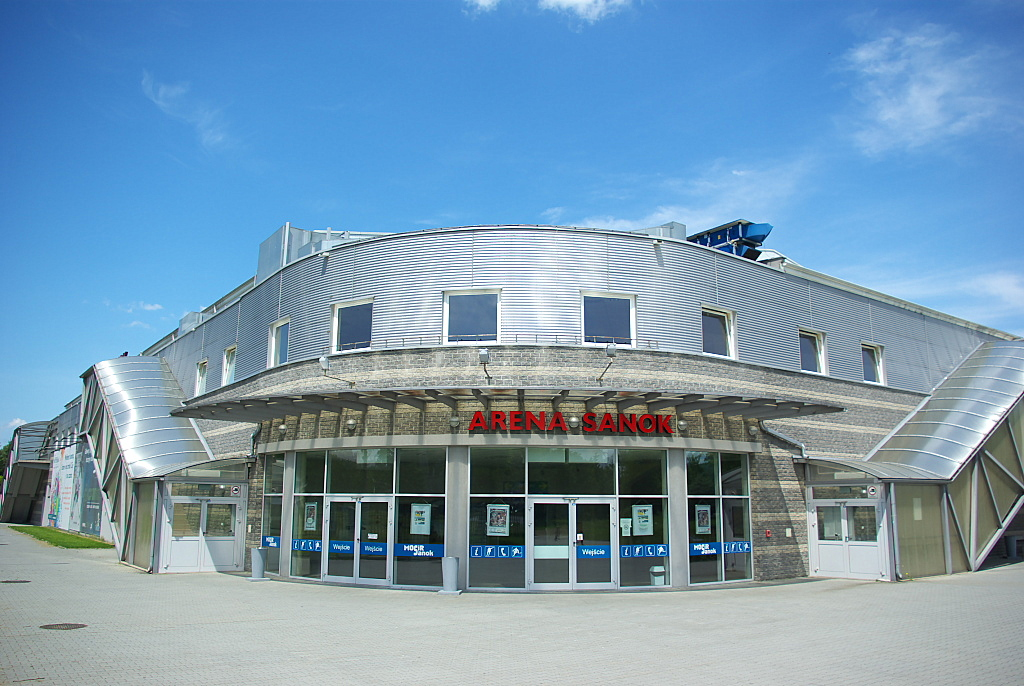
Arena Sanok, home venue of STS Sanok ice hockey team

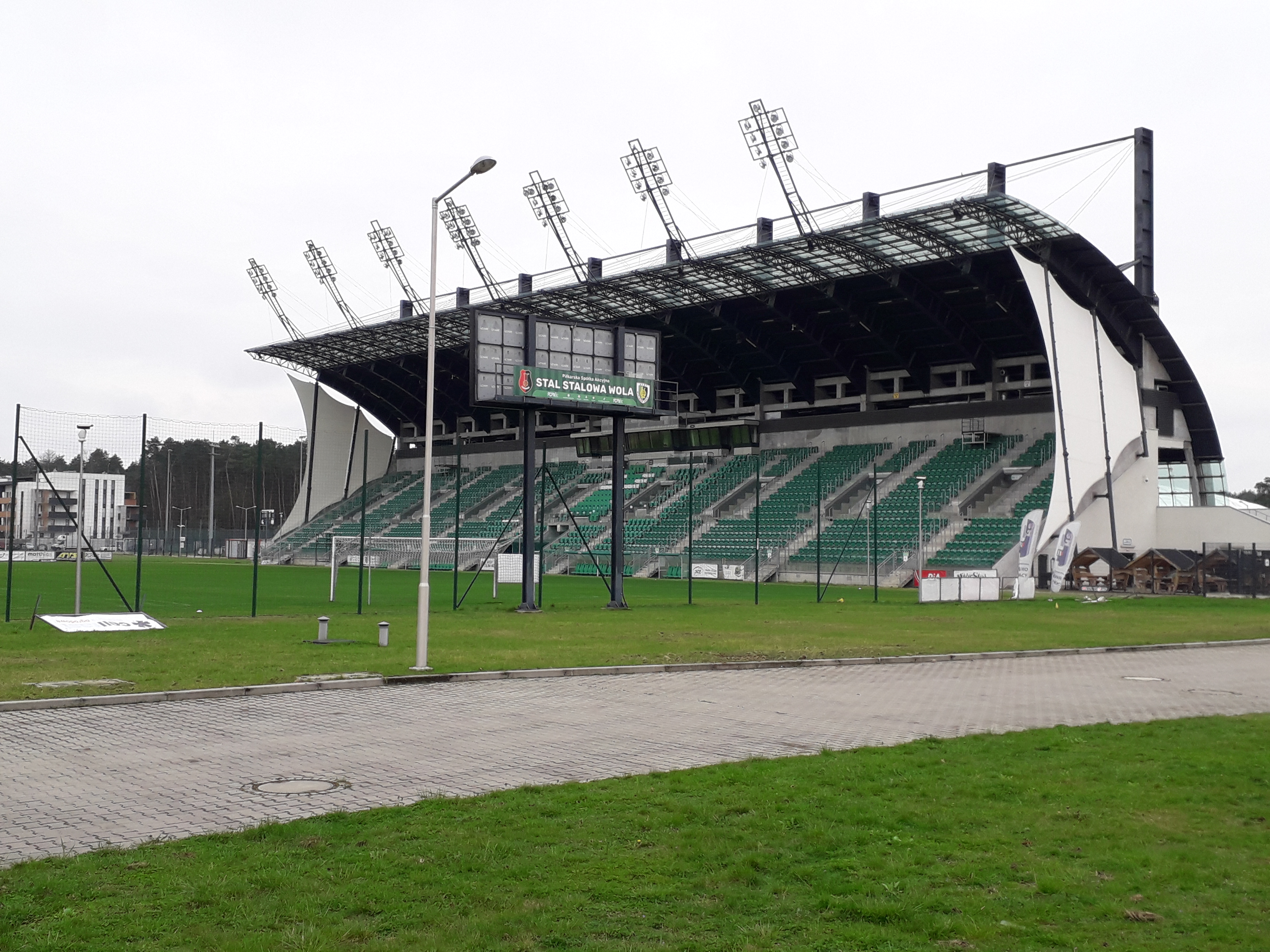
Subcarpathian Football Center, home venue of Stal Stalowa Wola football team

Motorcycle speedway, volleyball, ice hockey and football enjoy the largest following in the province. Resovia and Stal Rzeszów contest the Rzeszów Derby, one of the fiercest and most contested in Poland, with over 90 games (as of May 2024).

Professional sports teams
Club	Sport	League	Trophies
Resovia	Volleyball (men's)	PlusLiga	7 Polish Championships; 3 Polish Cups (1975, 1983, 1987); 1 CEV Cup (2024)
KS Developres Rzeszów	Volleyball (women's)	Tauron Liga	1 Polish Championship (2025); 2 Polish Cups (2022, 2025)
KPSK Stal Mielec	Volleyball (women's)	Tauron Liga	0
Karpaty Krosno	Volleyball (women's)	I liga	0
San Jarosław	Volleyball (women's)	I liga	0
Stal Rzeszów	Speedway	I liga	2 Polish Championships (1960, 1961)
Wilki Krosno	Speedway	I liga	0
STS Sanok	Ice hockey	Polska Hokej Liga	2 Polish Championships (2012, 2014); 2 Polish Cups (2010, 2011)
Stal Mielec	Football (men's)	I liga	2 Polish Championships (1973, 1976)
Resovia	Football (men's)	II liga	0
Stal Rzeszów	Football (men's)	I liga	1 Polish Cup (1975)
Stal Stalowa Wola	Football (men's)	II liga	0
Siarka Tarnobrzeg	Football (men's)	III liga	0
Resovia	Football (women's)	Ekstraliga	0
Sokół Łańcut	Basketball (men's)	I Liga	0
Miasto Szkła Krosno	Basketball (men's)	Polish Basketball League	0
Resovia	Basketball (men's)	I Liga	1 Polish Championship (1975); 1 Polish Cup (1974)
Niedźwiadki Przemyśl	Basketball (men's)	I Liga	0
JKS Jarosław	Handball (women's)	Superliga	0
Stal Mielec	Handball (men's)	Polish Superliga	1 Polish Cup (1971)
Eurobus Przemyśl	Futsal (men's)	Ekstraklasa	0

== Subcarpathia landscape pictures ==
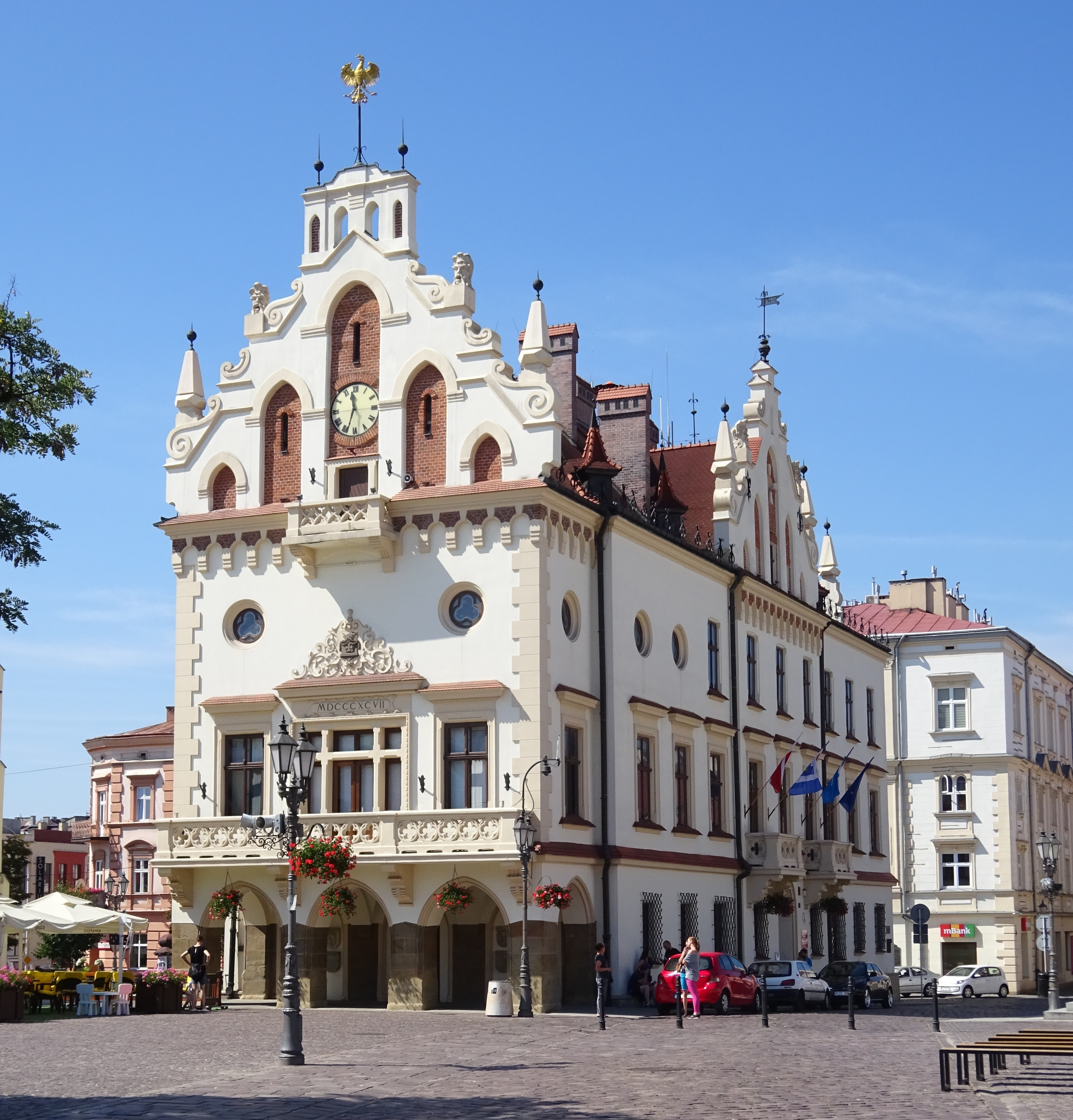
Rzeszów town hall

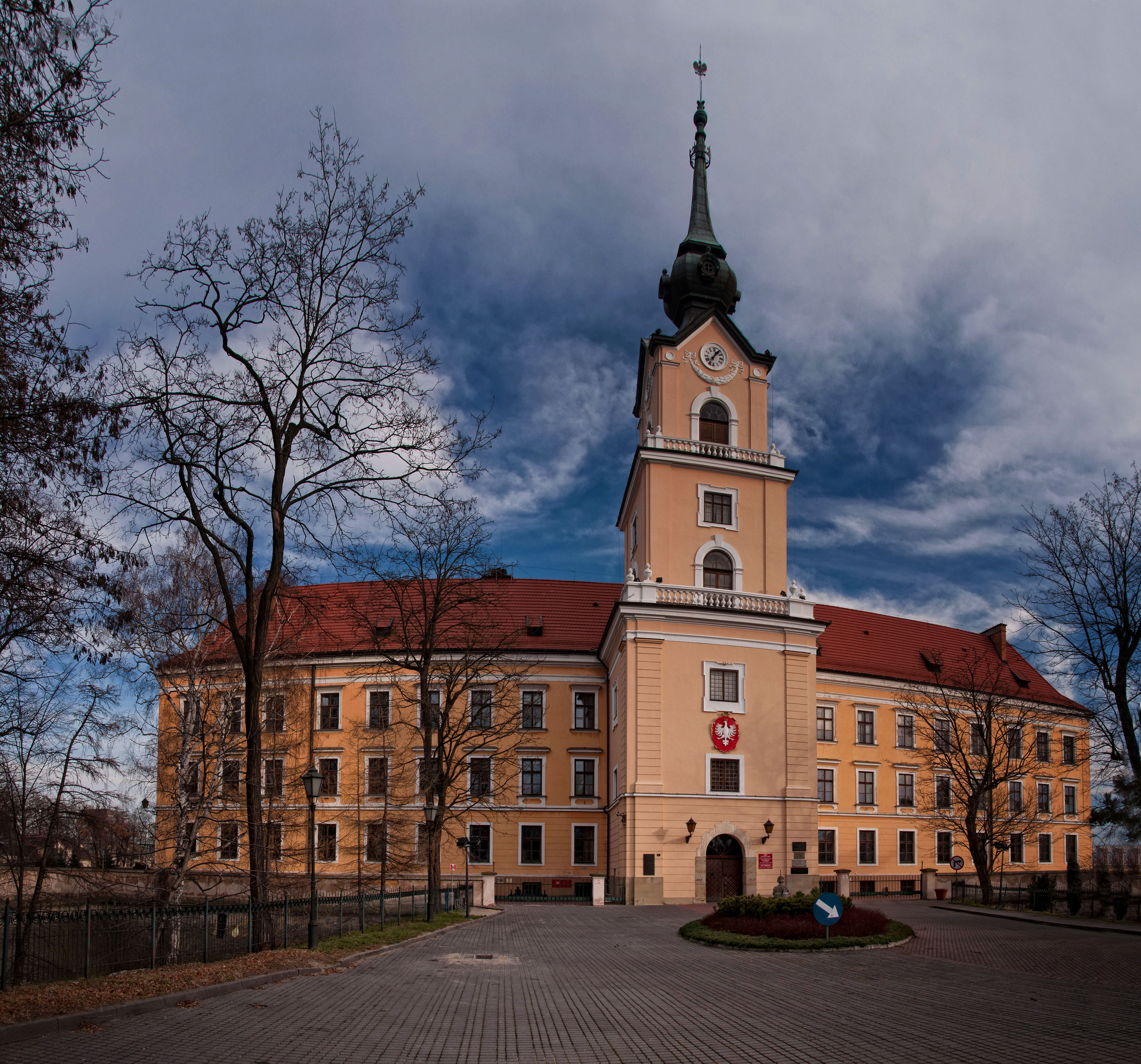
Palace of Lubomirski family in Rzeszów

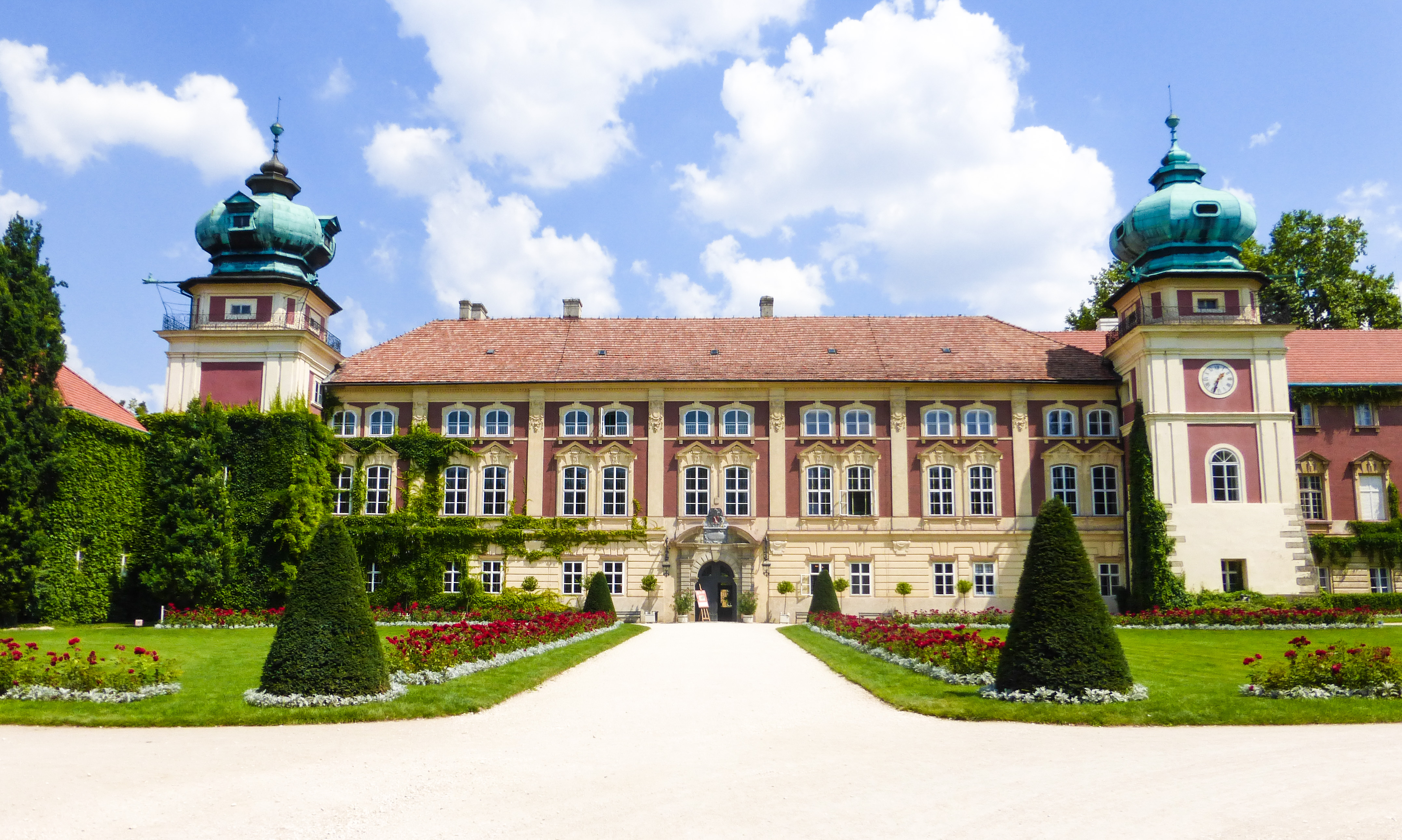
Łańcut Castle

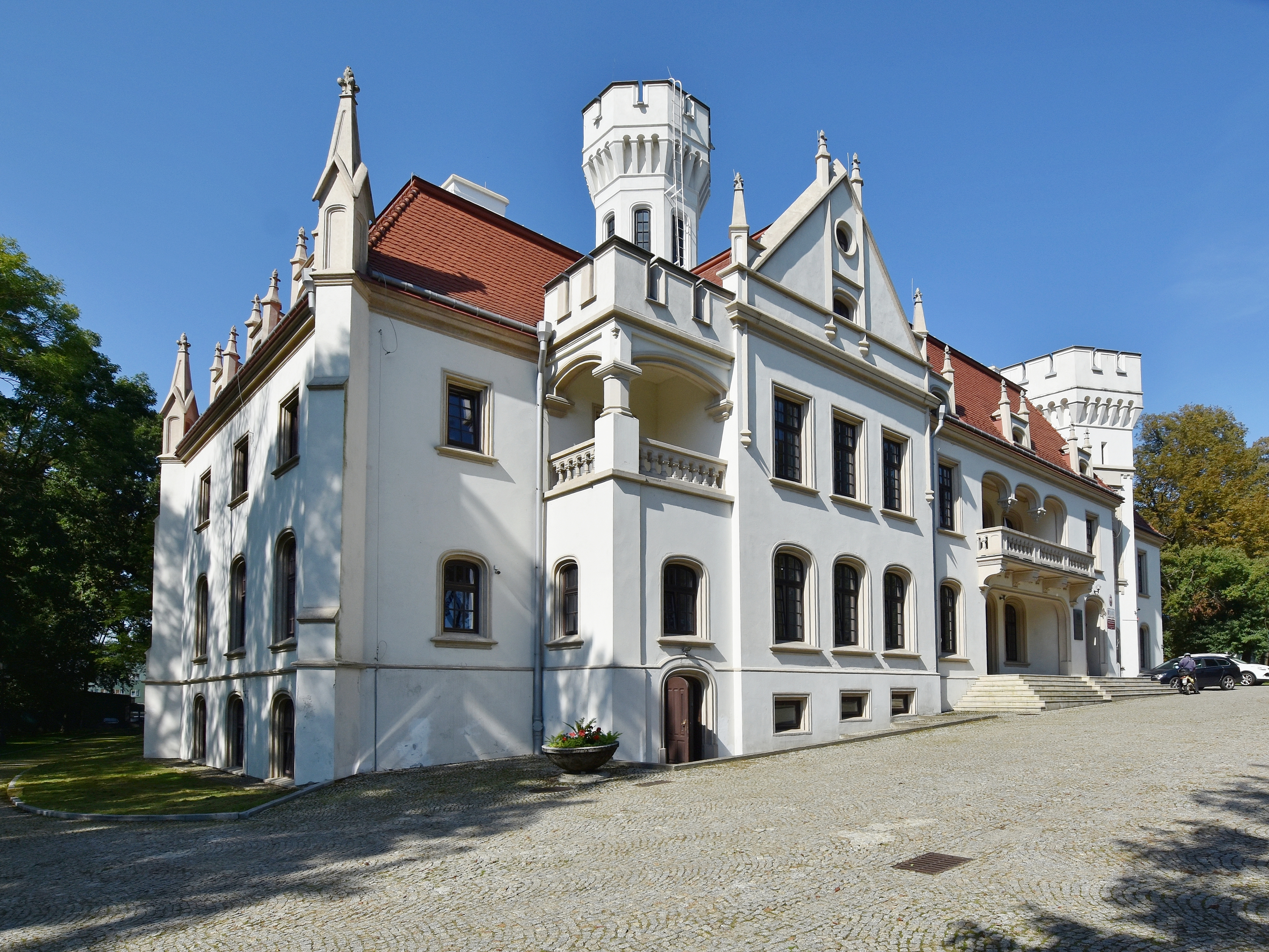
Jasło Palace

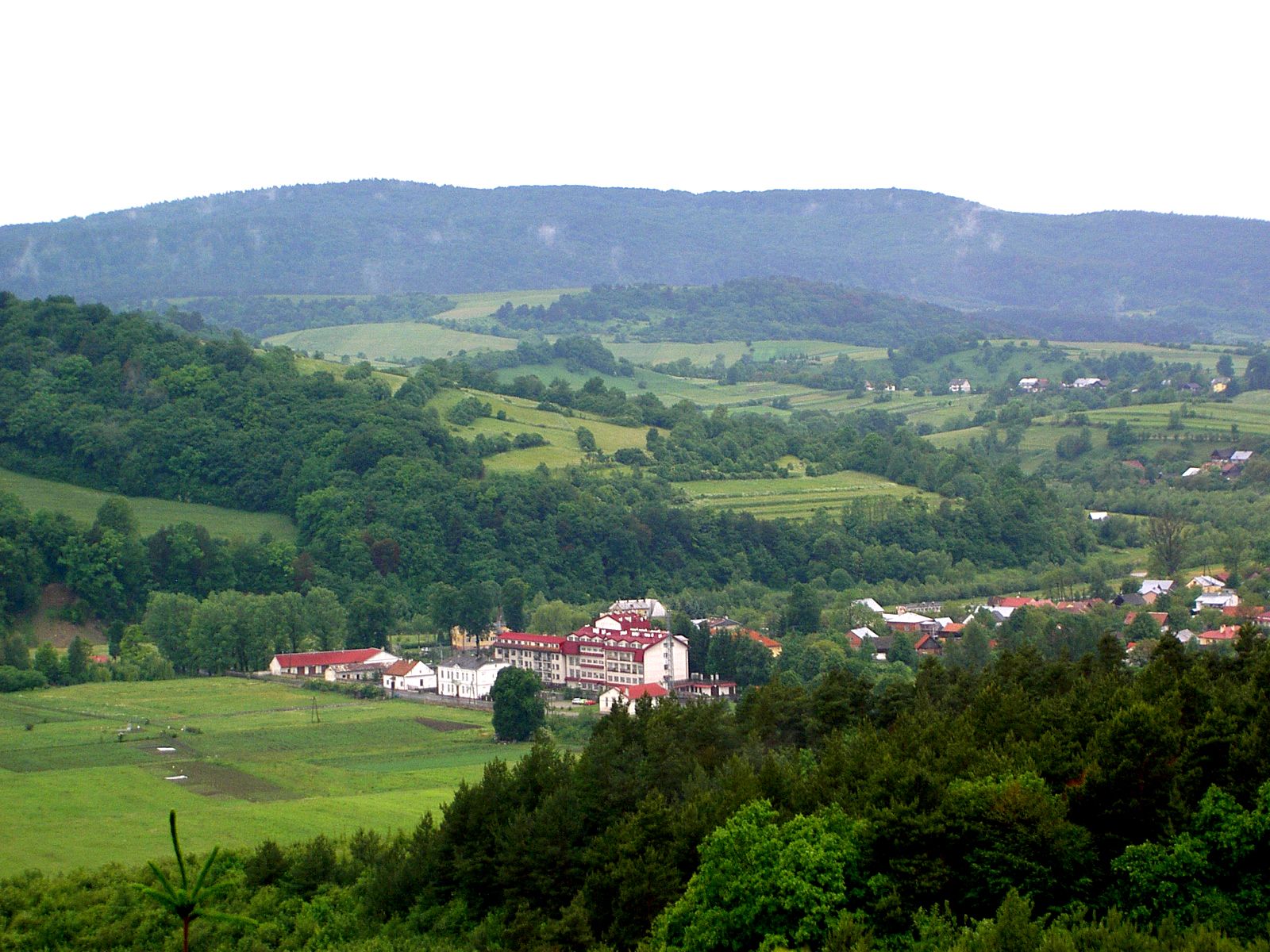
Huwniki

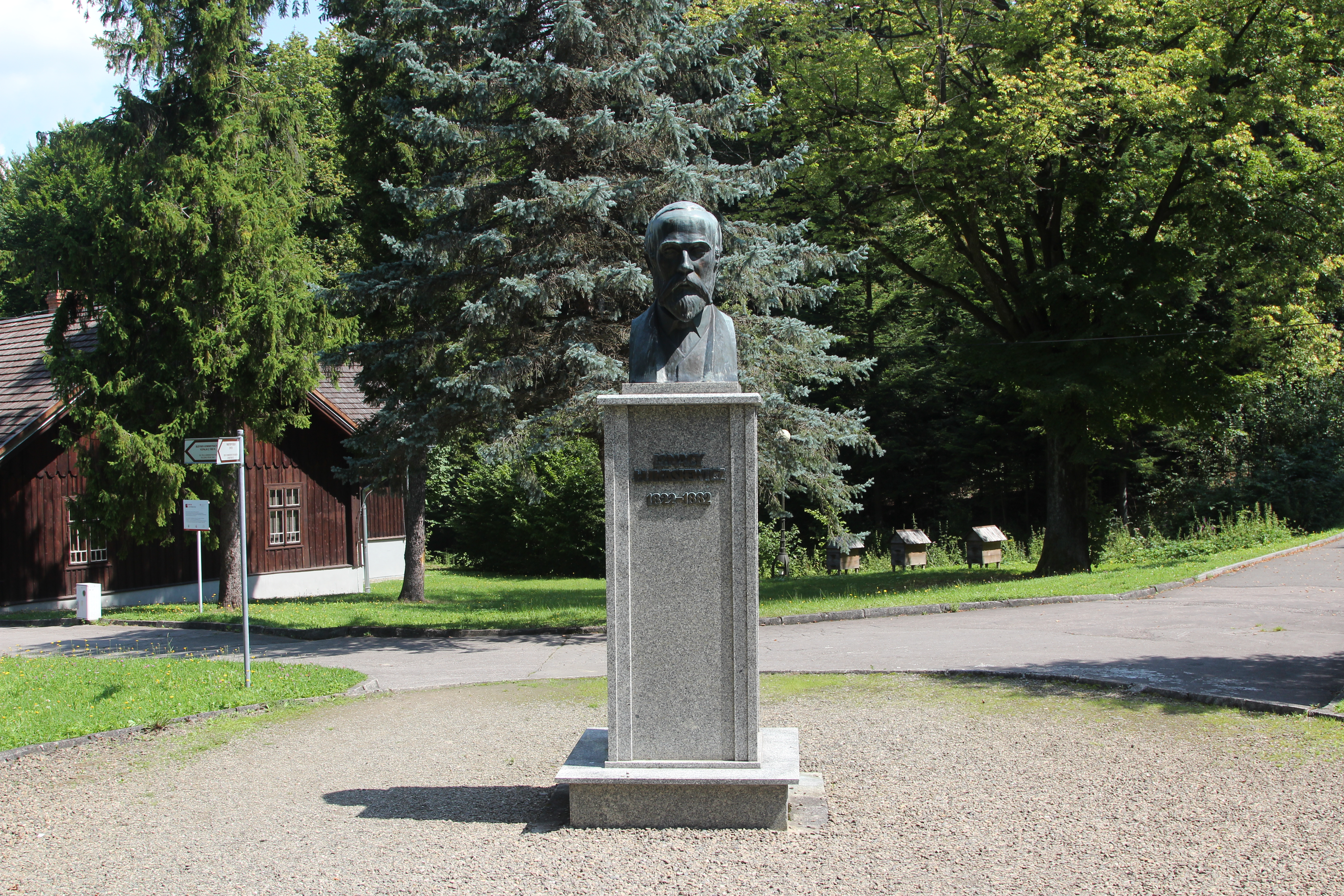
Ignacy Łukasiewicz Monument in Bóbrka

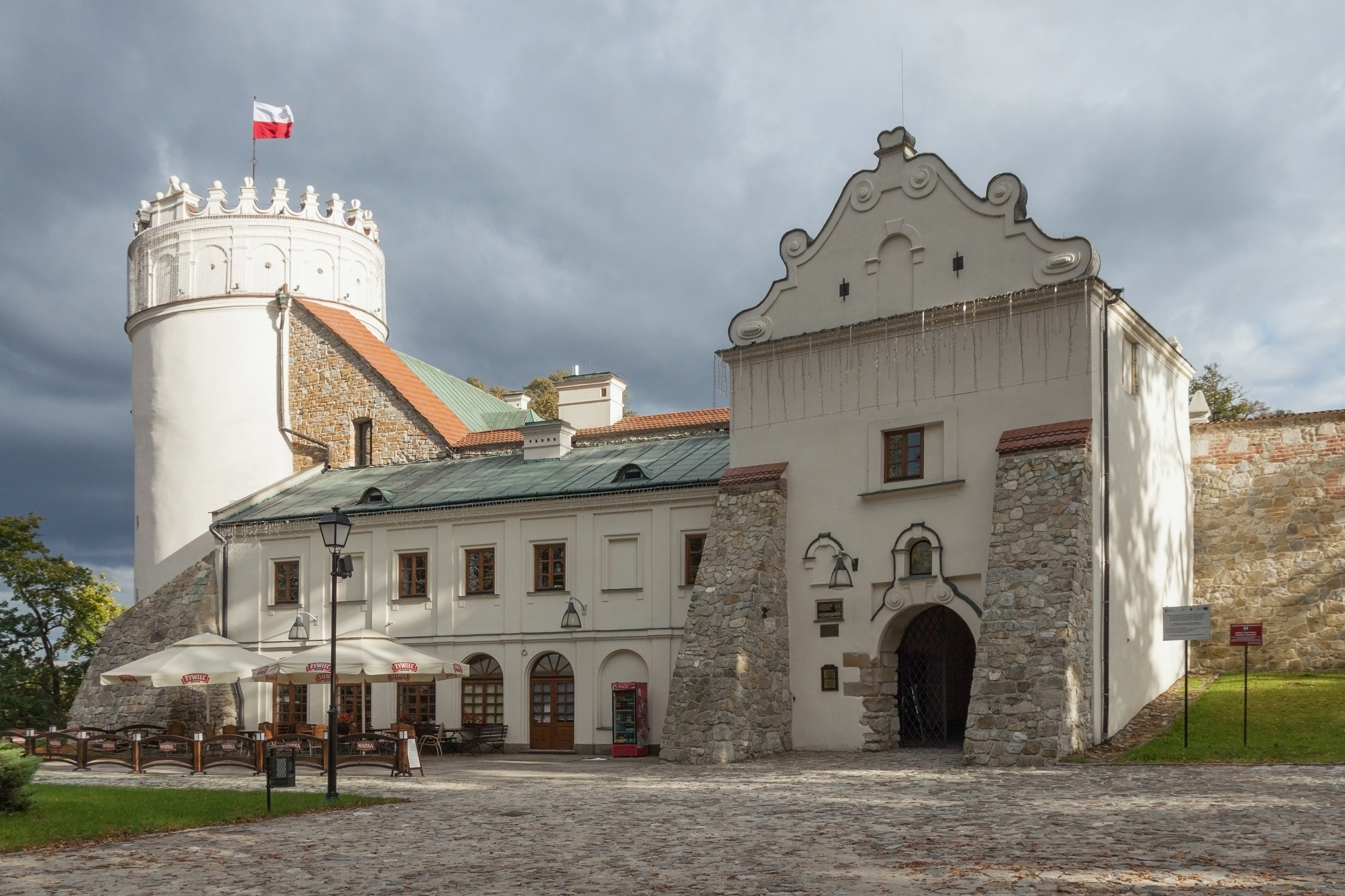
Royal Casimir Castle in Przemyśl

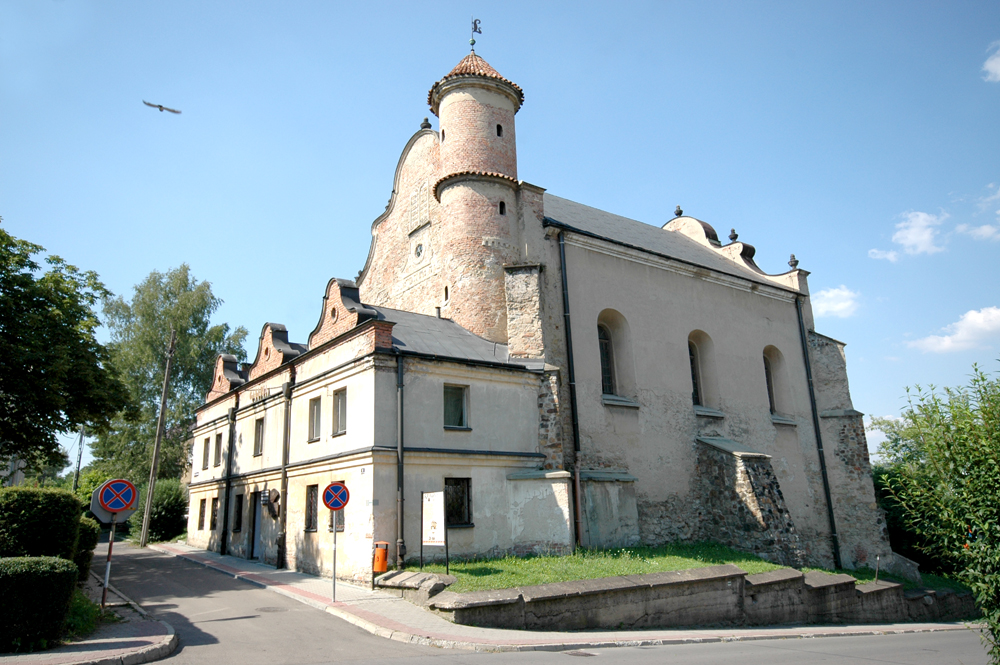
Lesko synagogue

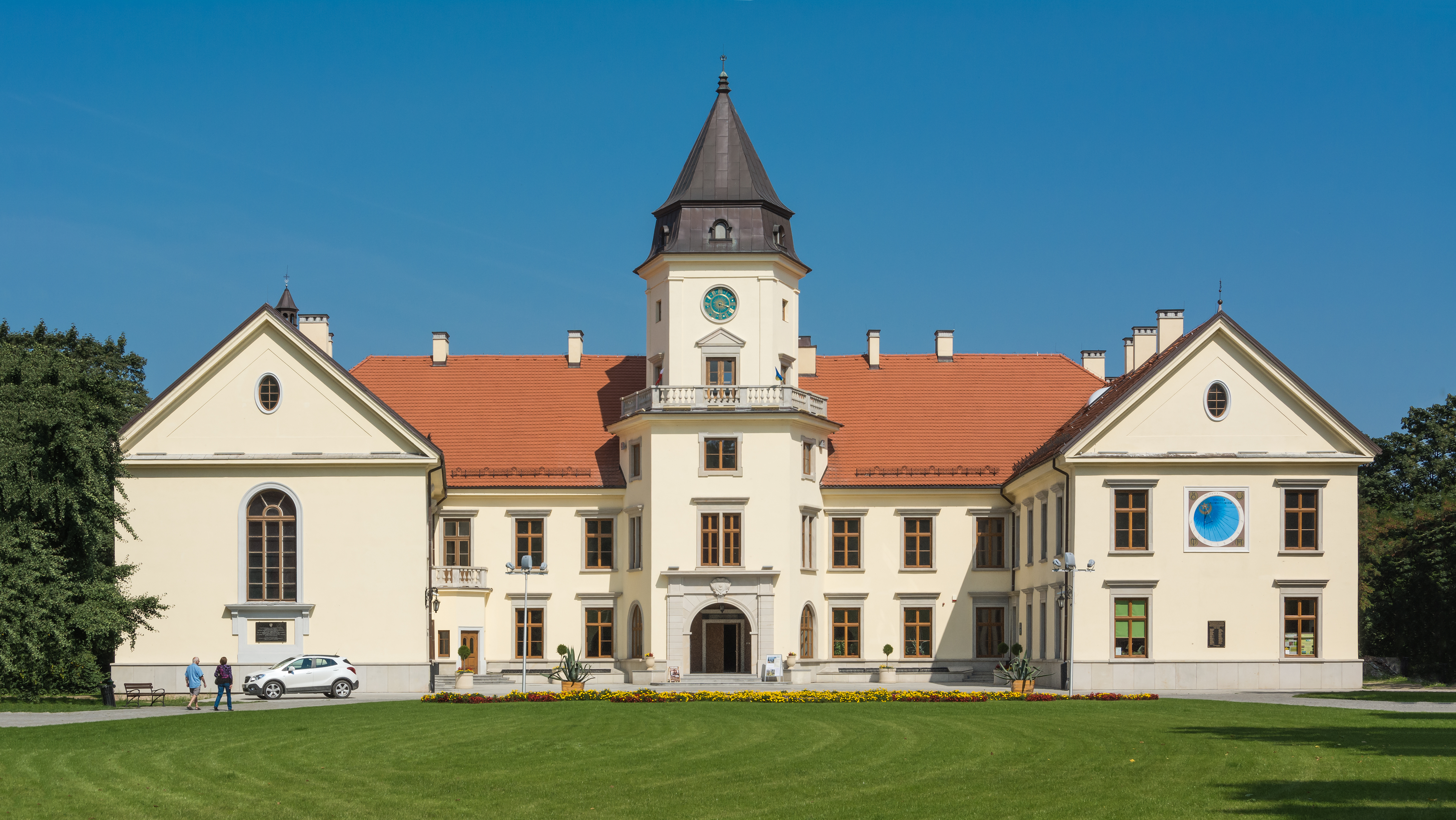
Tarnowski Palace in Tarnobrzeg

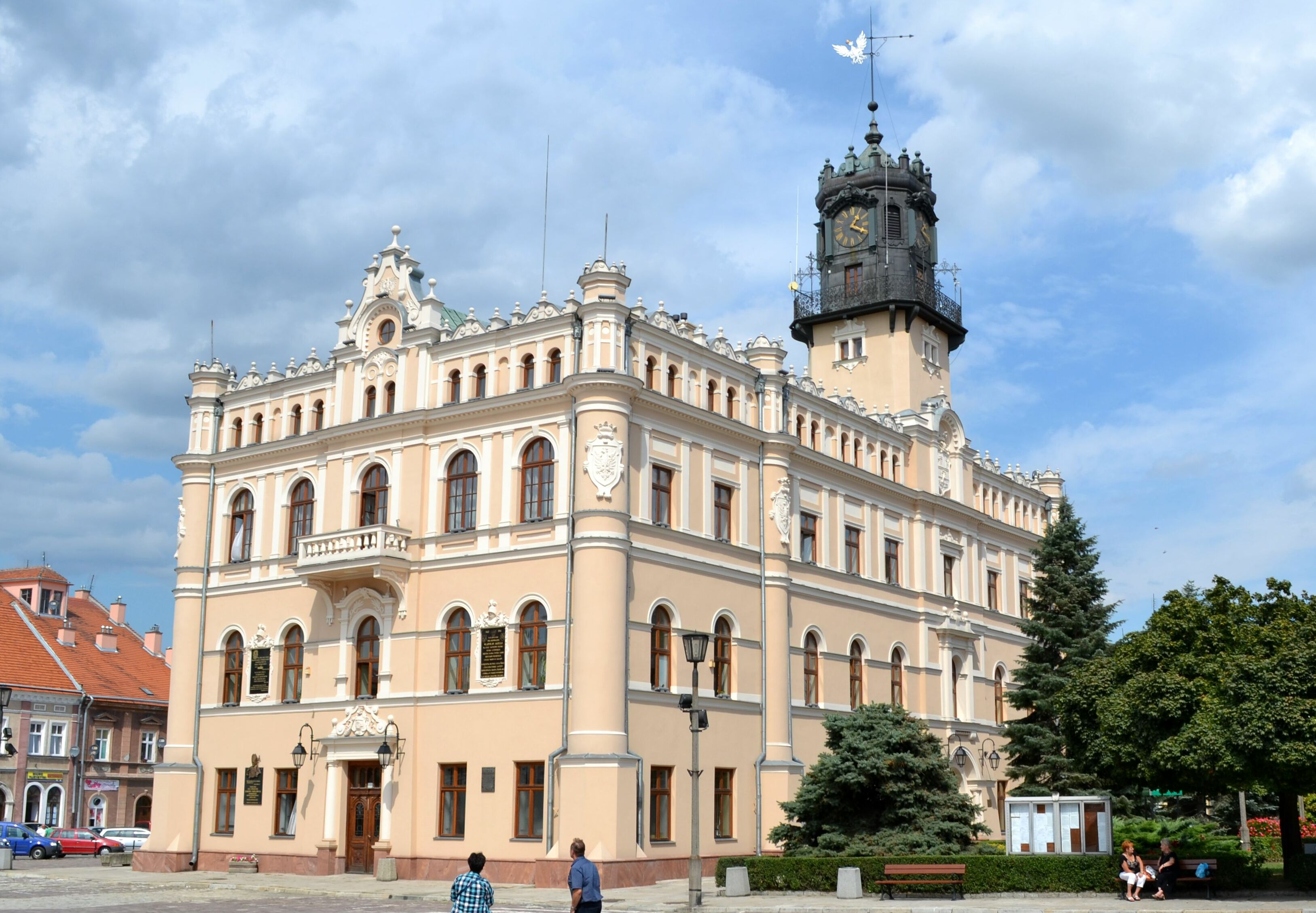
Jarosław town hall

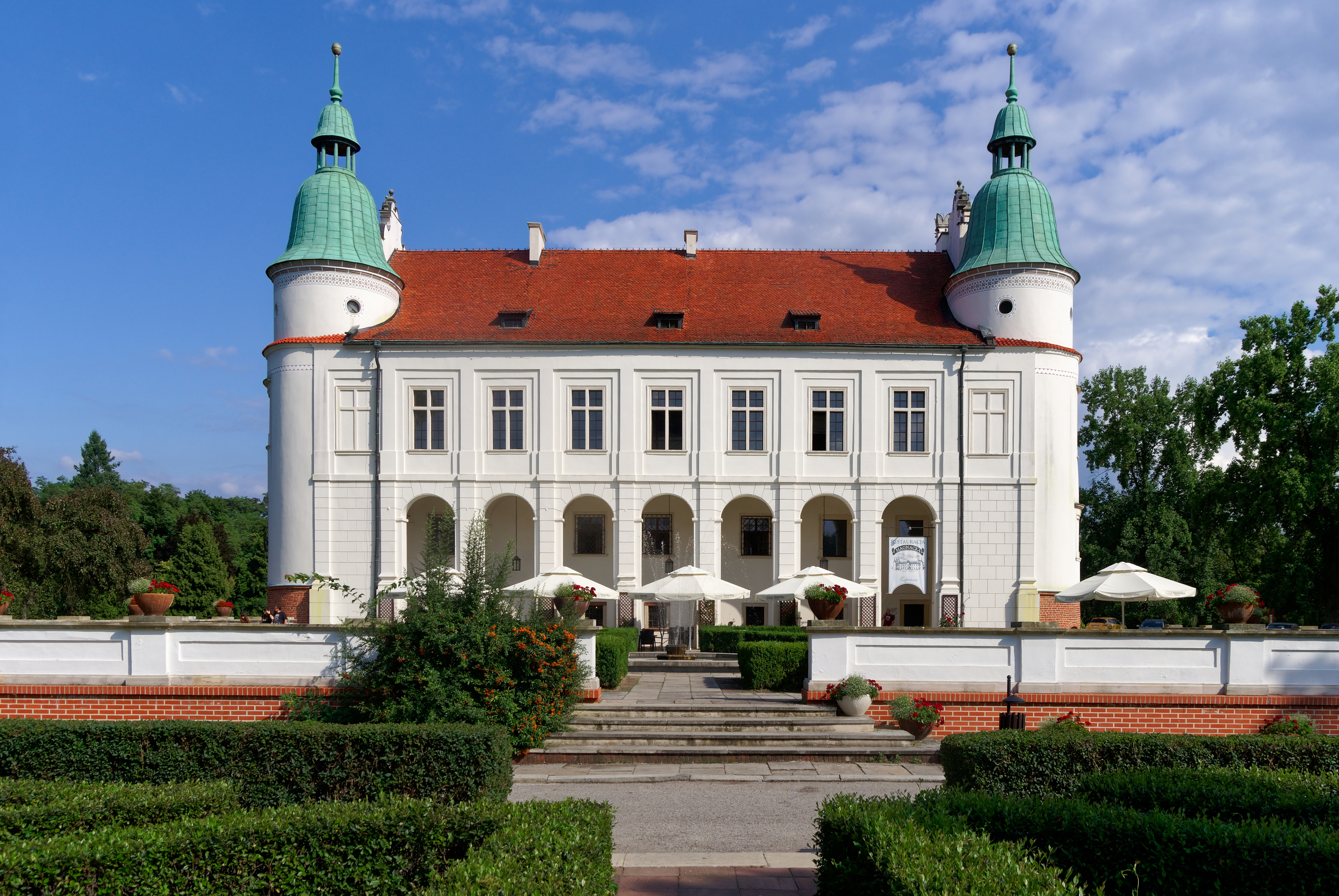
Baranów Sandomierski Castle

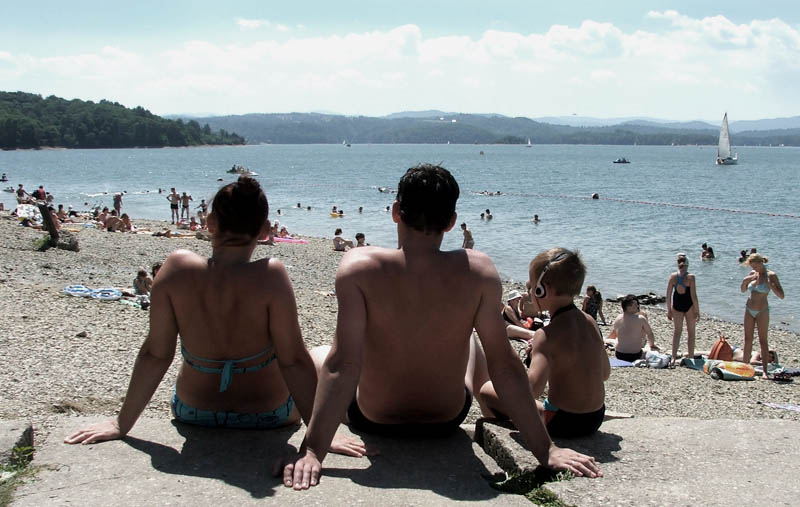
Solina Lake

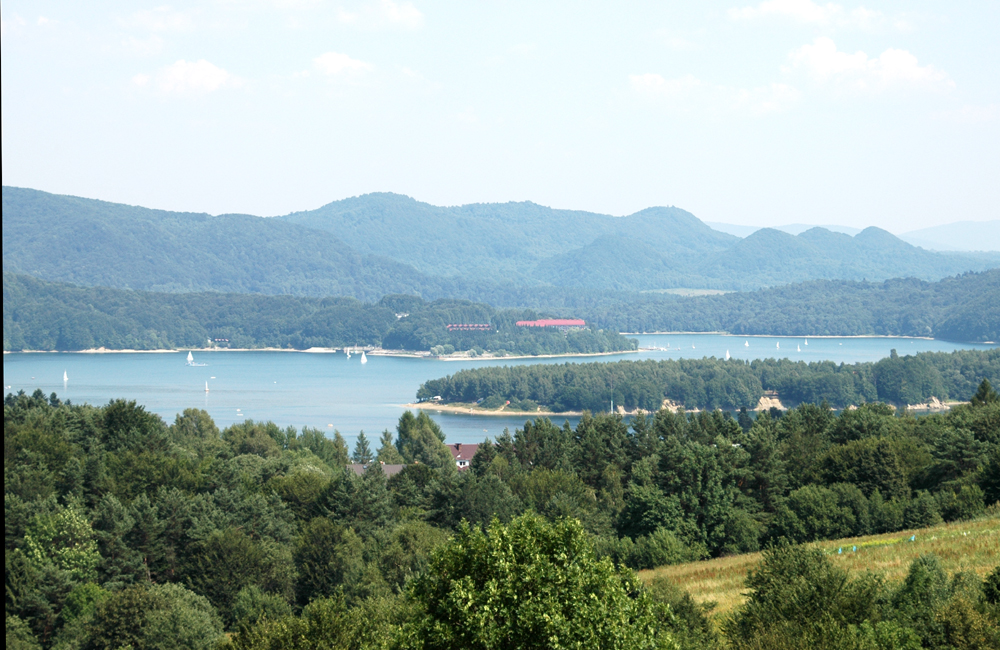
Solina seen from the distance

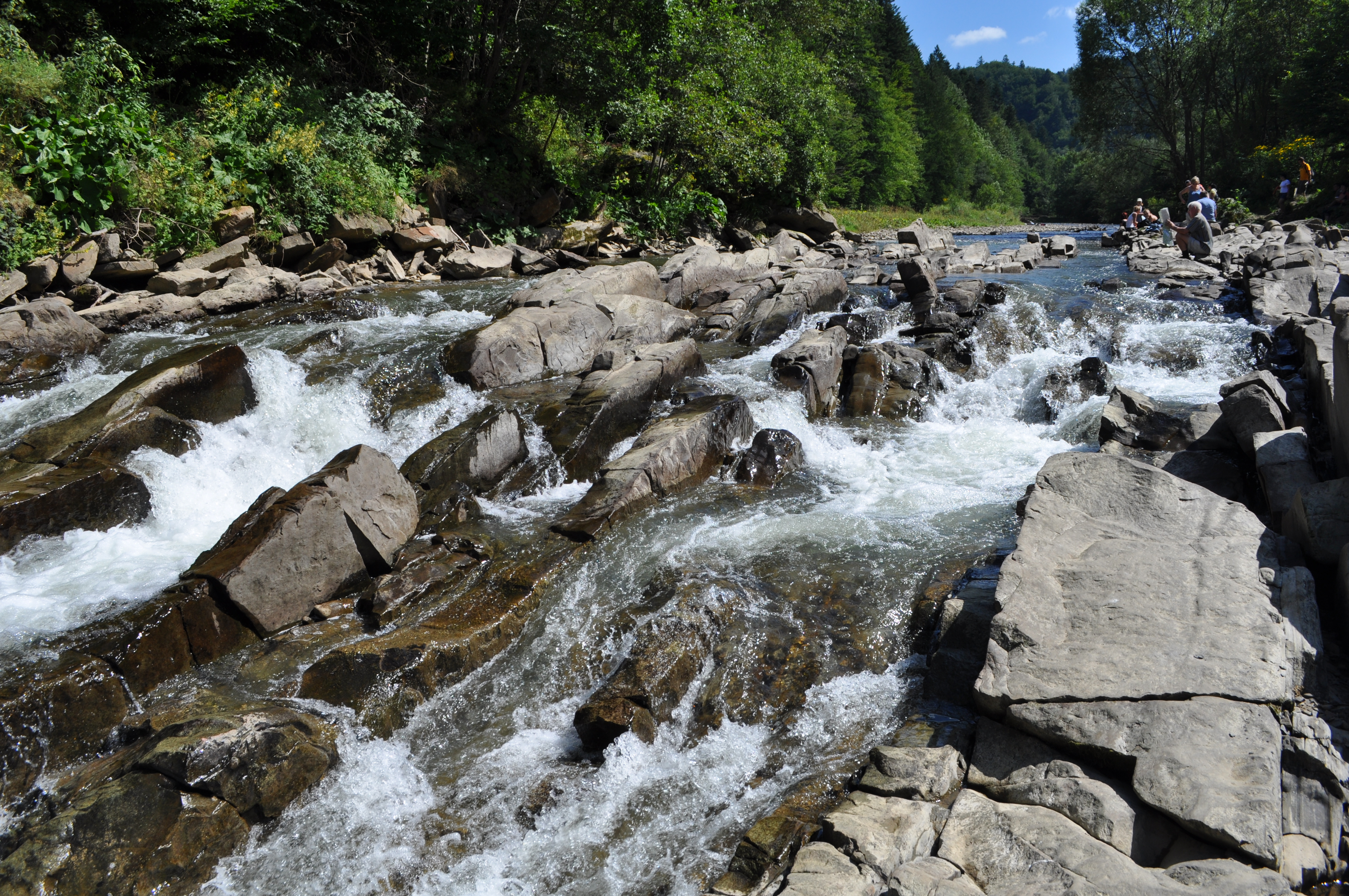
Wetlina River

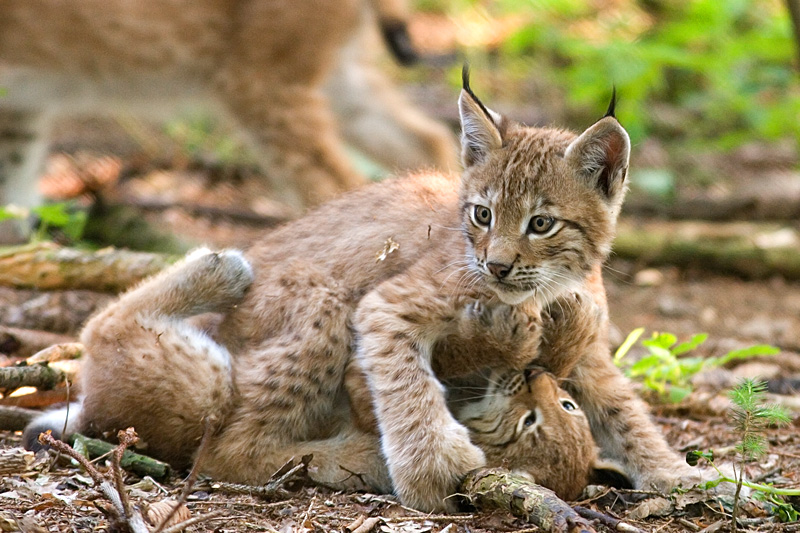
Lynx

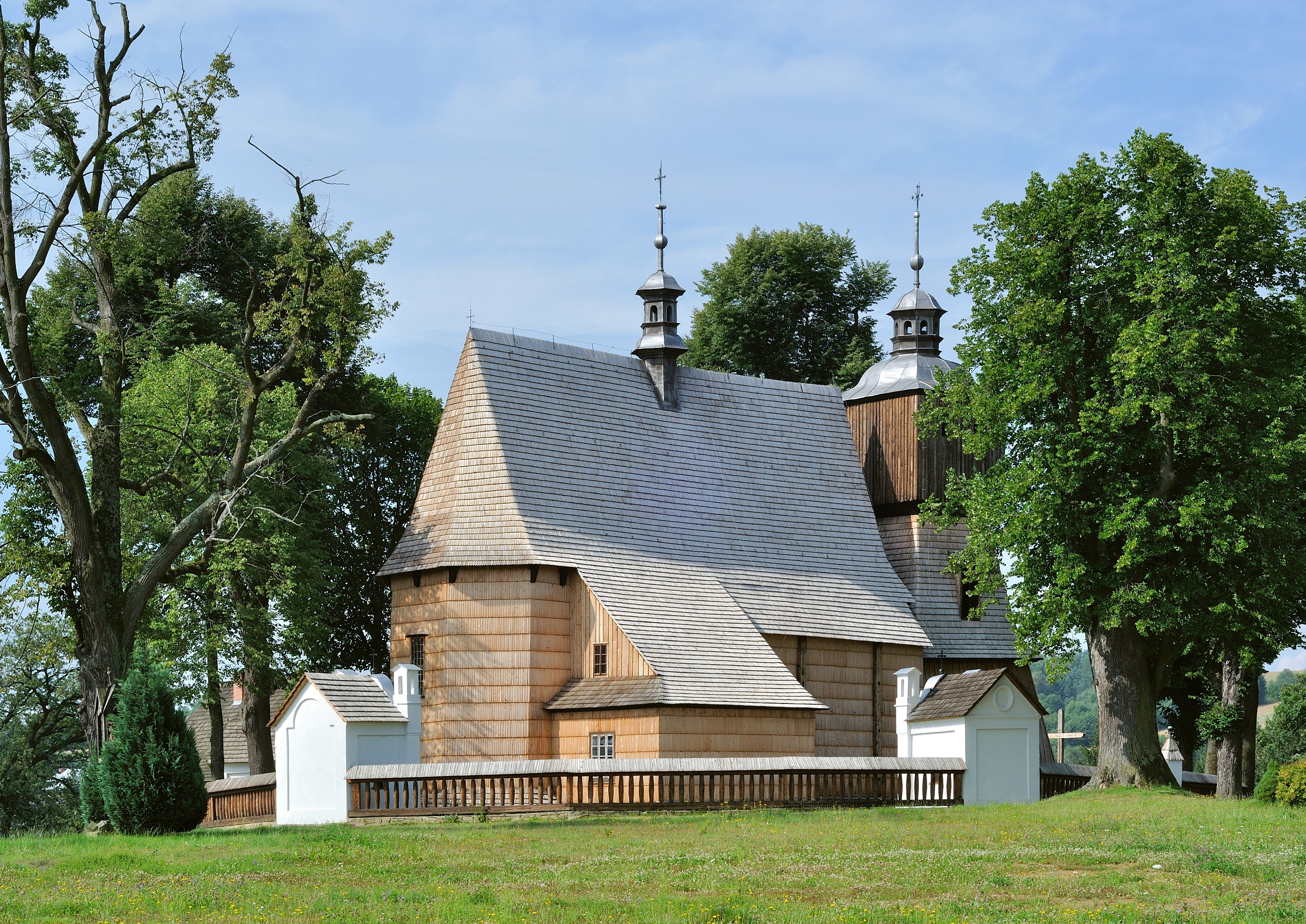
Church of All Saints in Blizne, a UNESCO World Heritage Site

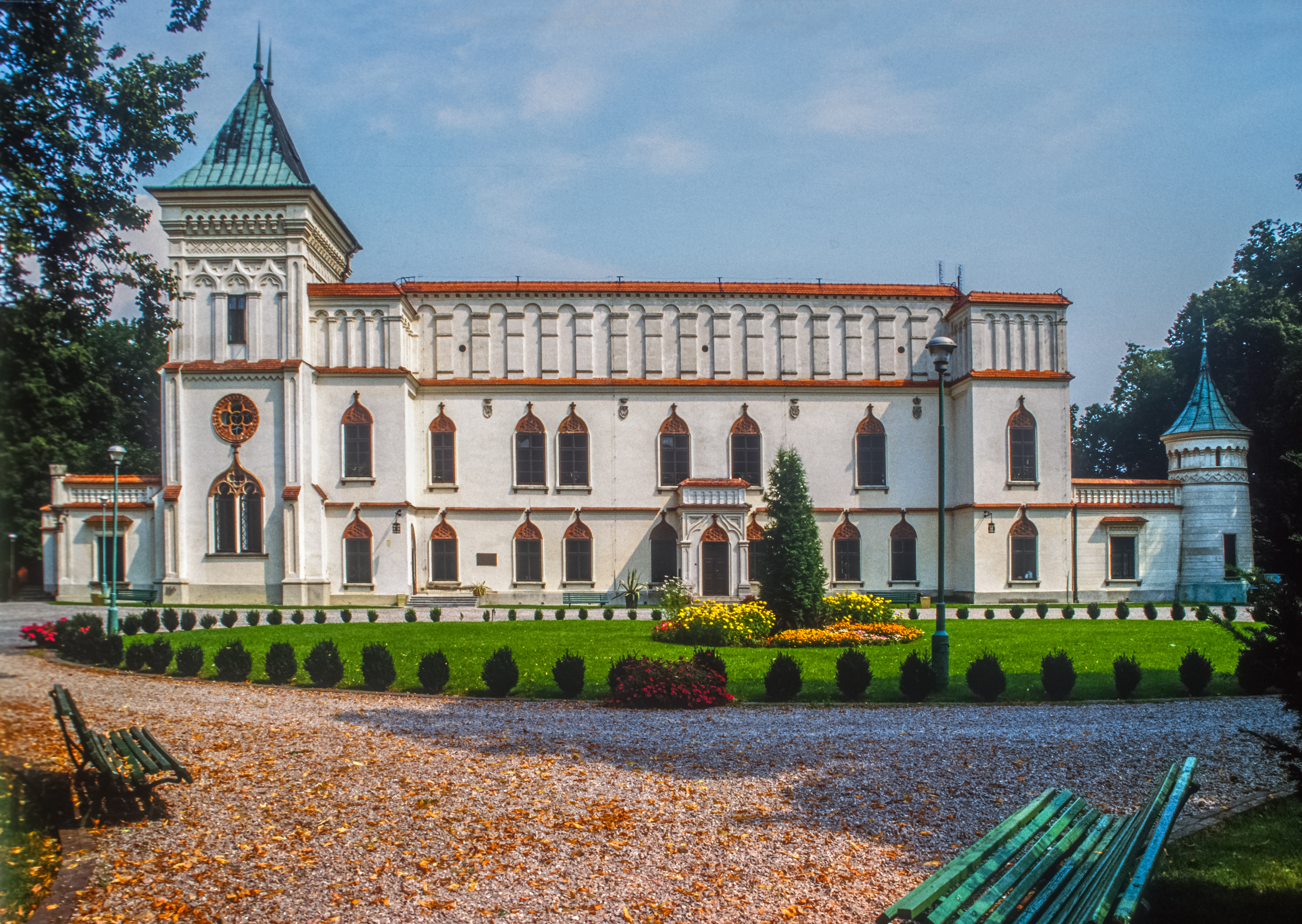
Przecław

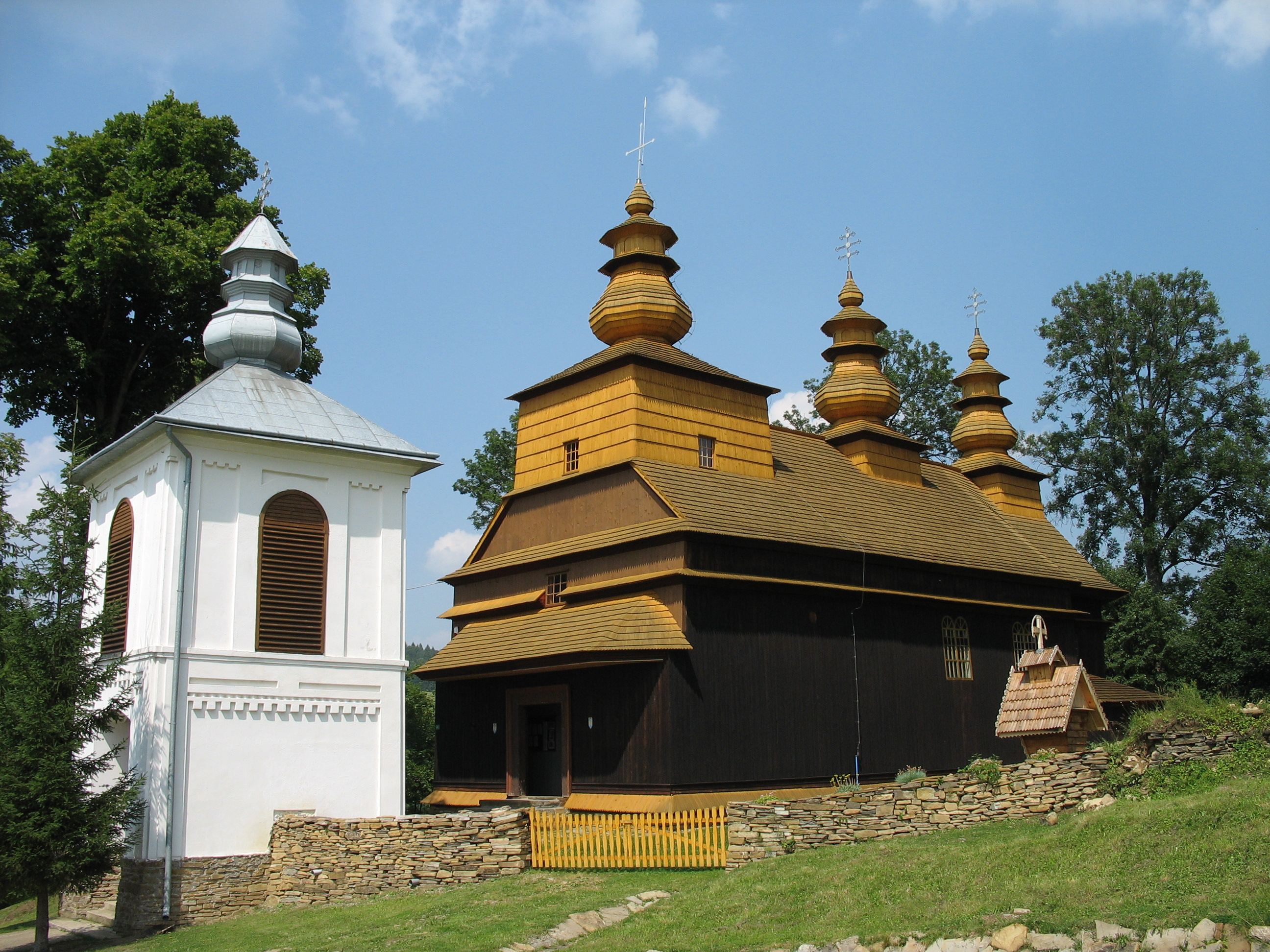
Wisłok Wielki

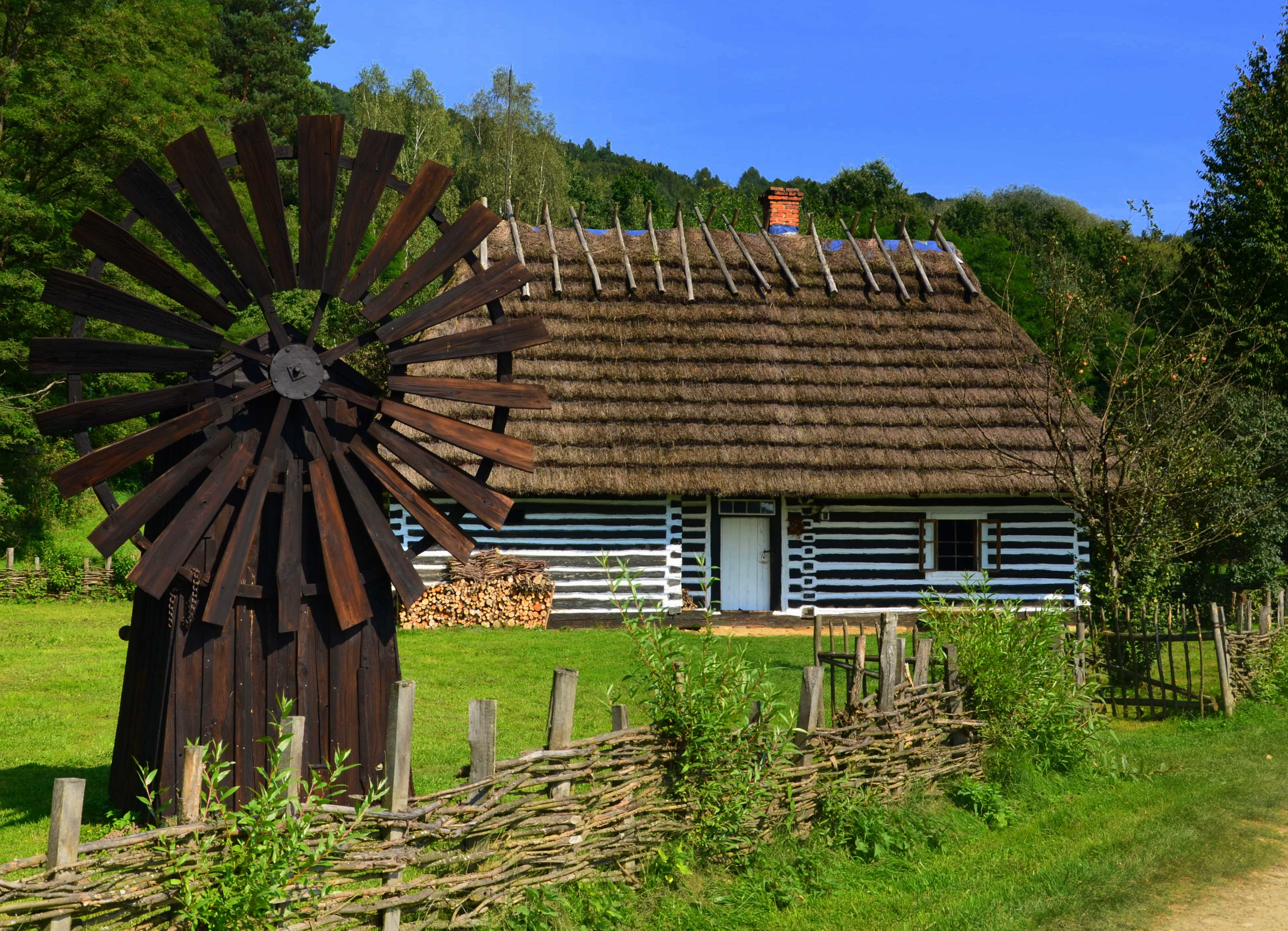
Open air museum in Sanok

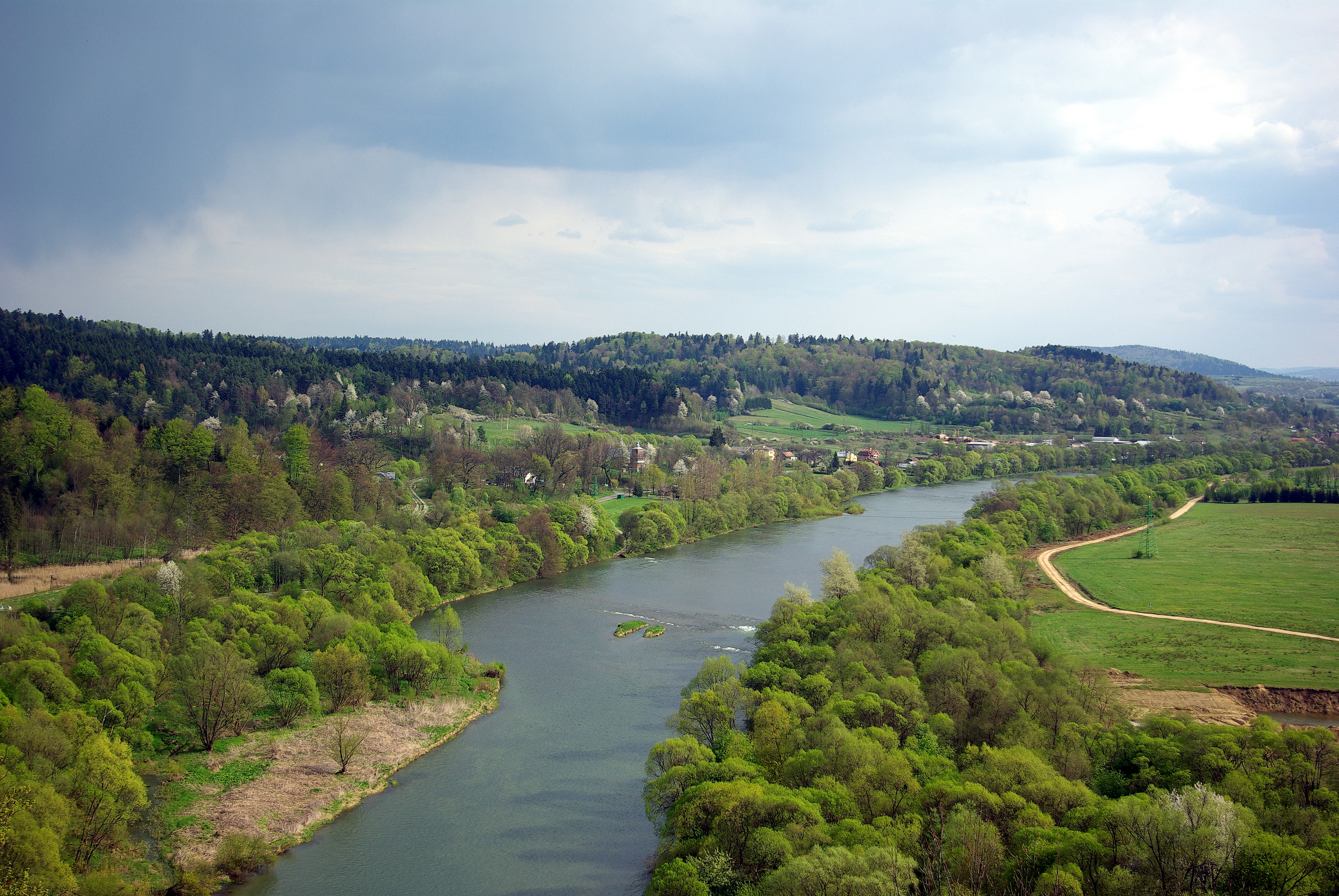
San River

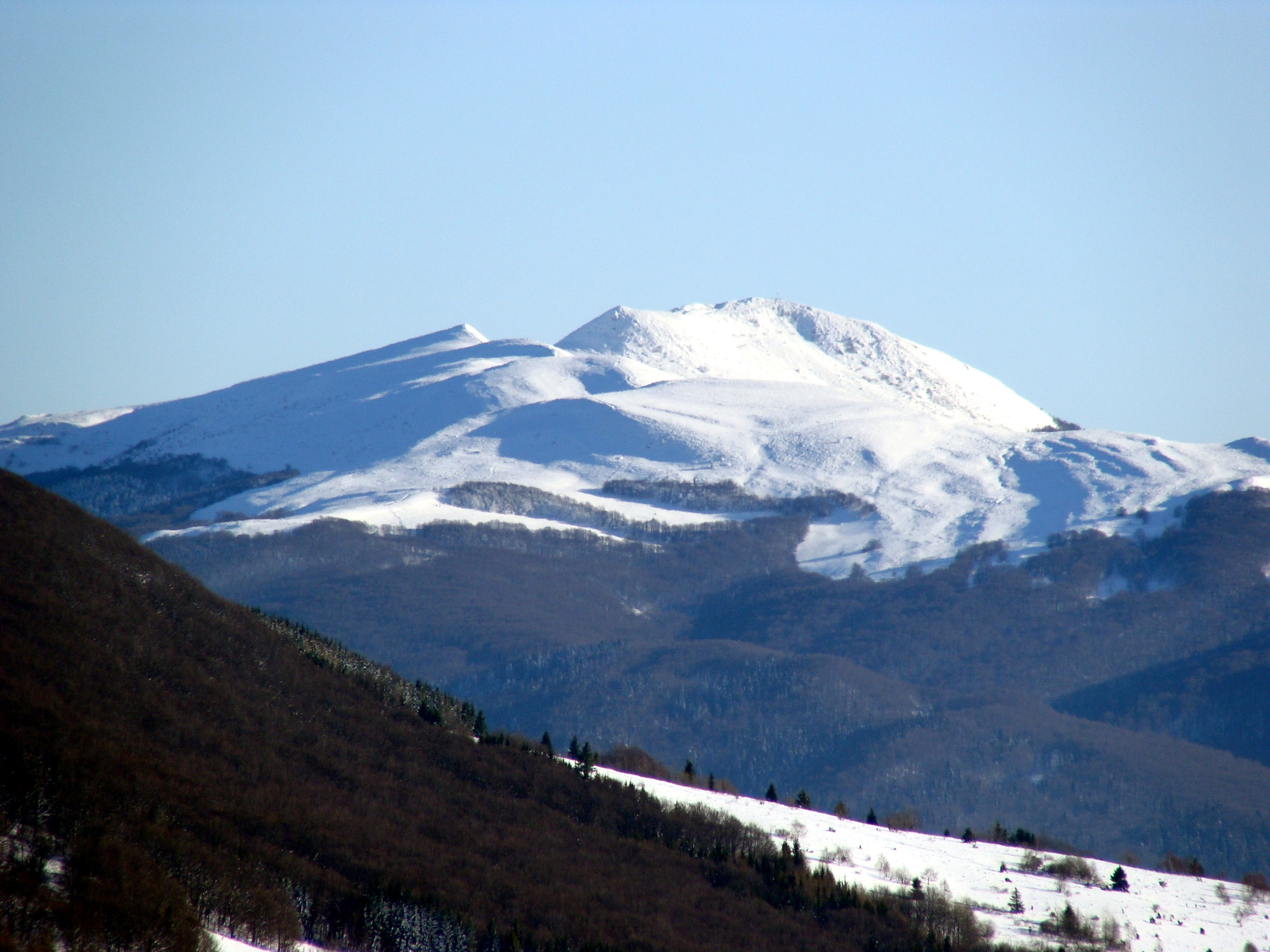
Tarnica Mountain

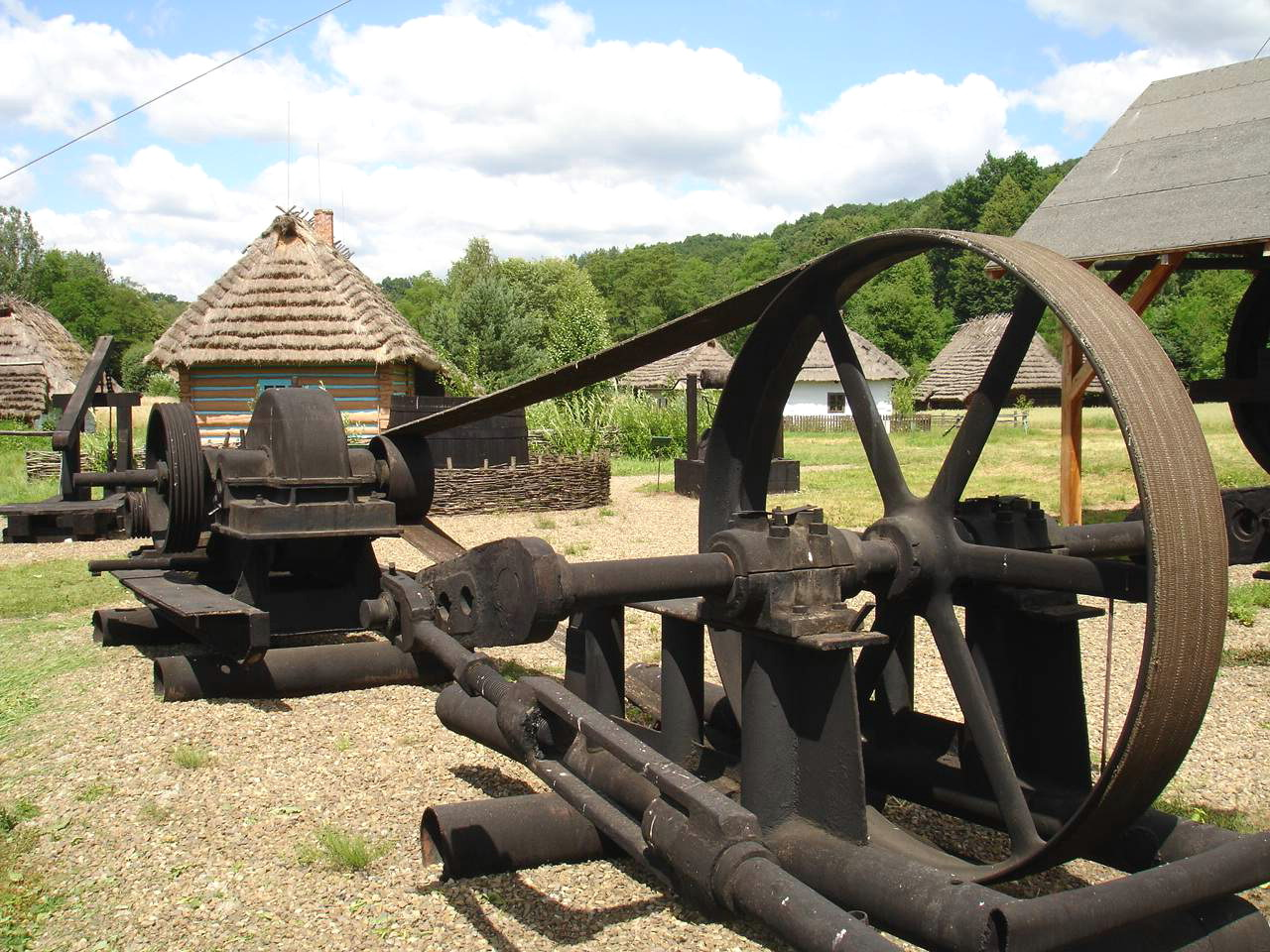
A historic oil well

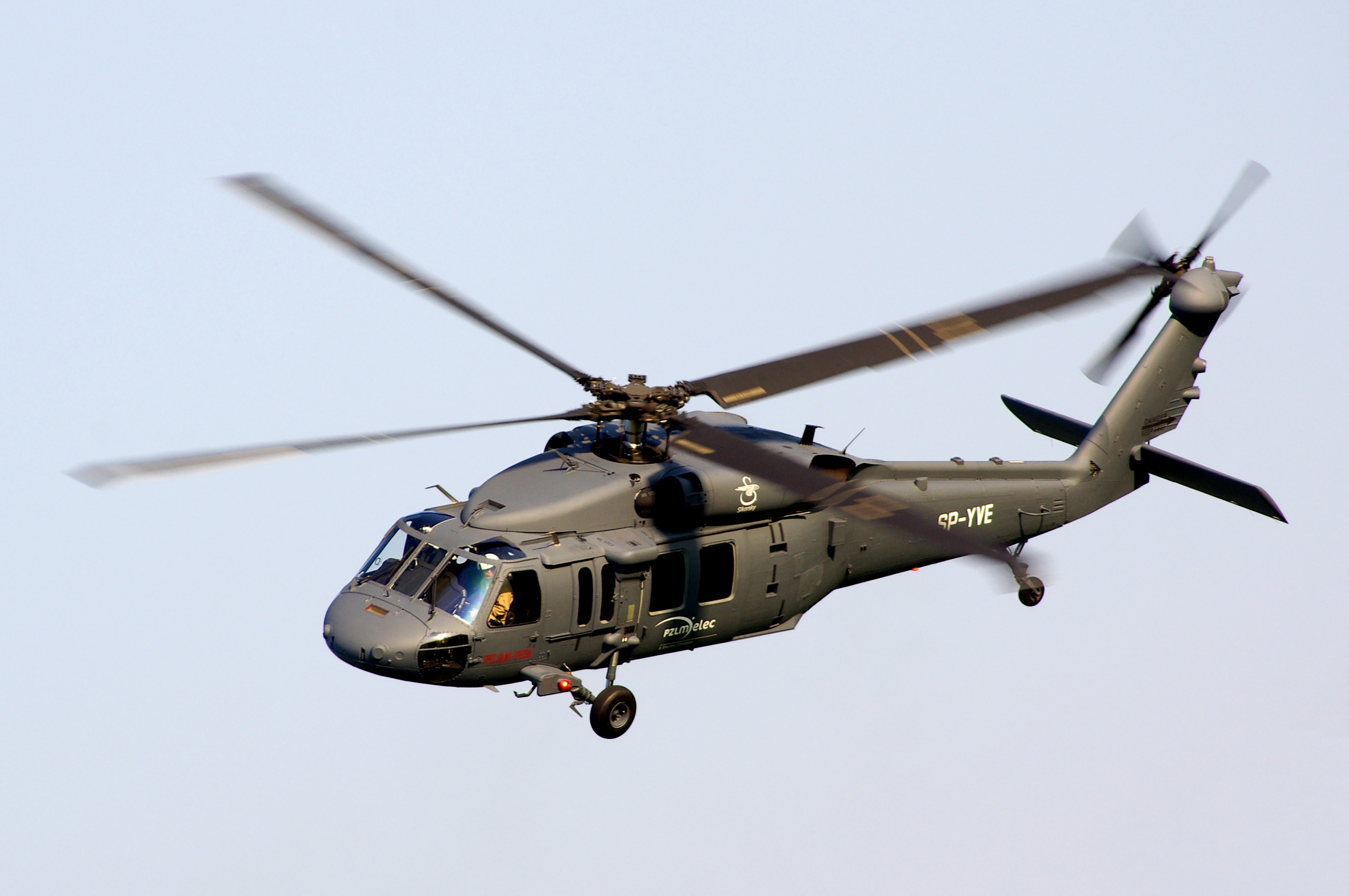
Black Hawk helicopters are produced by PZL Mielec

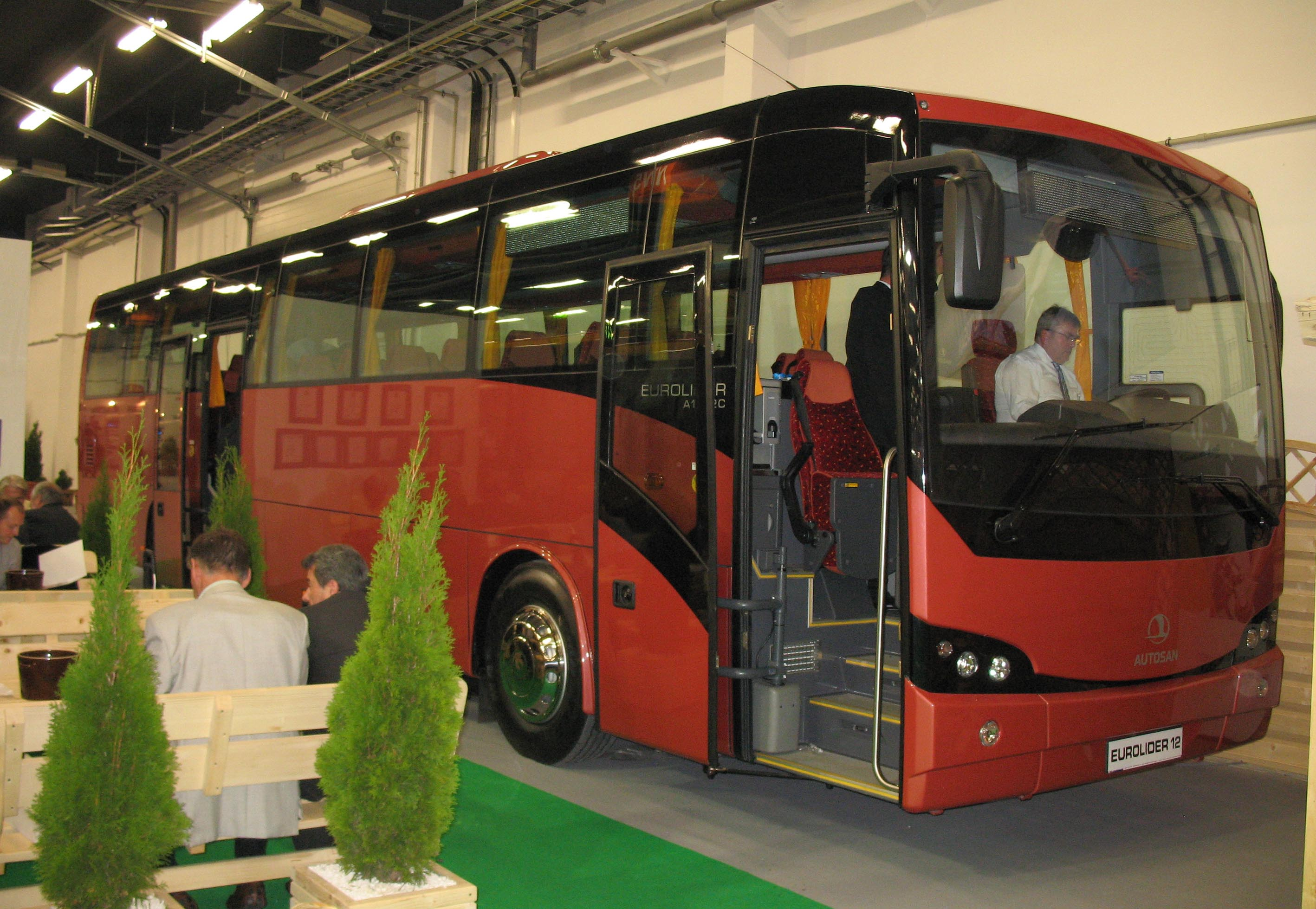
Autosan bus and coach manufacturer has its headquarters in Sanok

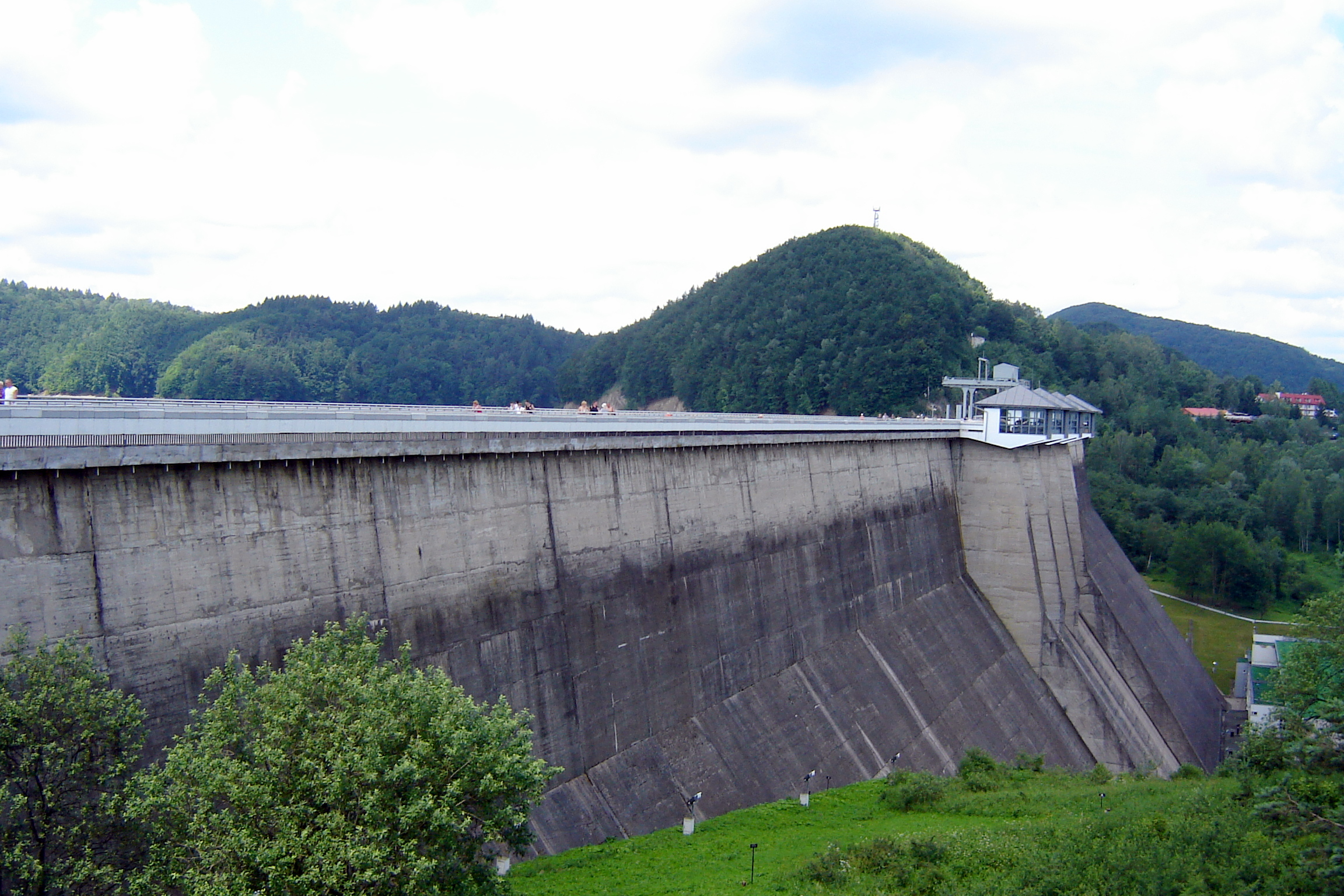
Solina Dam is the largest dam in Poland

== Curiosities ==
- In the 17th century, there was a sizeable Scottish community in Krosno. There is a monument to Robert Gilbert Porteous in Krosno, Scottish immigrant, the city's wealthiest 17th-century merchant.
- In 1711, Jarosław was the place of refuge of Hungarian leader Francis II Rákóczi and his court, including essayist Kelemen Mikes, after the failure of the Rákóczi's War of Independence against Austria.

== See also ==
- Galicia
- Second Polish Republic's Lwów Voivodeship
