= Bieszczady Forest Railway =

Narrow-gauge railway line in Poland

Bieszczadzka Kolejka Leśna
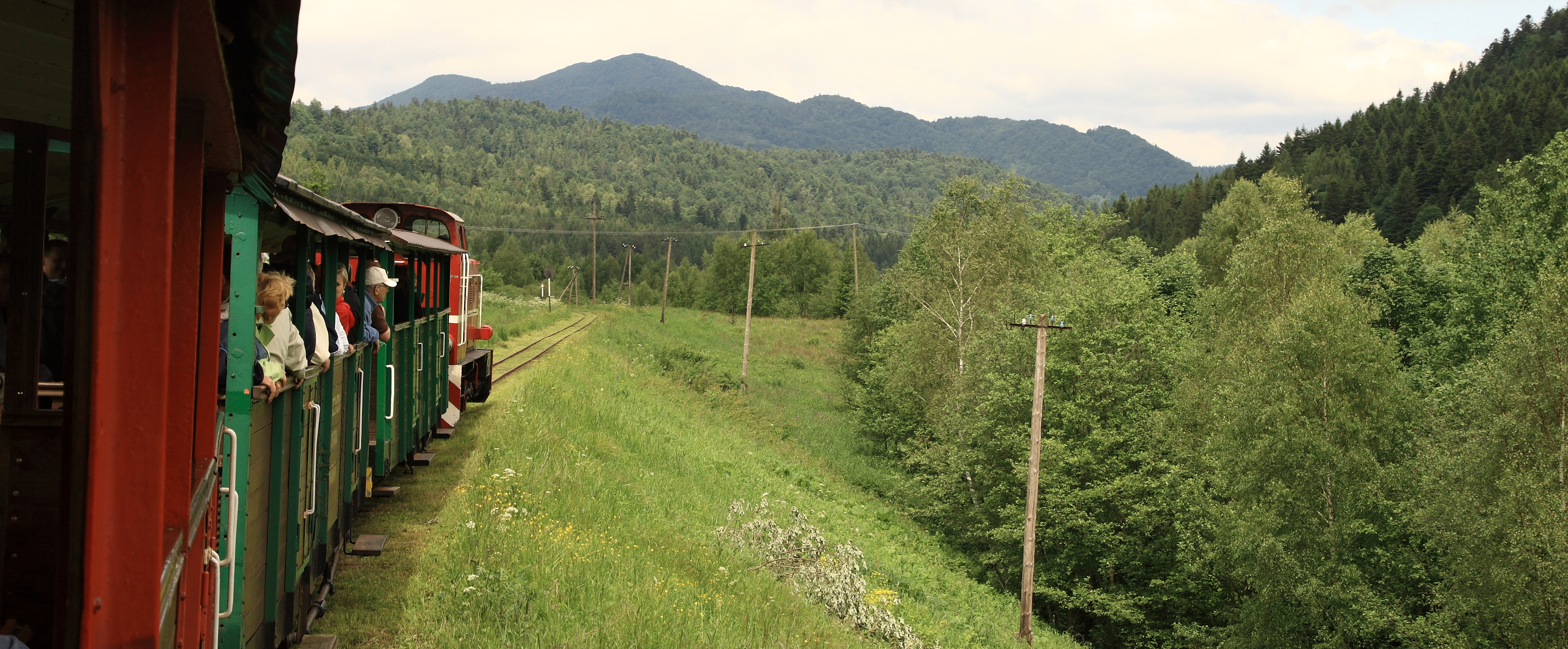
- On a track towards Przysłup
- Locale: Bieszczady, Poland
- Terminus: Majdan
- Coordinates: 49.205829°N 22.298700°E

Commercial operations
- Original gauge: 760 mm (2 ft 5 15/16 in); 750 mm (2 ft 5 1/2 in)

Preserved operations
- Owned by: State Treasury
- Operated by: Fundacja Bieszczadzkiej Kolejki Leśnej
- Stations: 5
- Length: 20 kilometres (12.4 mi)
- Preserved gauge: 750 mm (2 ft 5 1/2 in)

Commercial history
- Opened: 1898
- 1944: ceased operation due to war damages
- 1953: taken over by State Forests, reconstruction started
- 1963: passenger traffic renewed
- Closed: 1994

Preservation history
- 1997: Re-opened as a heritage railway

Website
- http://kolejka.bieszczady.pl/

The Bieszczady Forest Railway (Polish: Bieszczadzka Kolejka Leśna) is a 750 mm (2 ft 5 1/2 in) narrow-gauge railway built in a sparsely populated, forested region of the Bieszczady Mountains. Construction commenced at the end of the 19th century and completed before World War I. Regular traffic ceased in 1994. Nowadays, from 1997, a part of the railway is utilized as a heritage railway and a tourist attraction. Trains run regularly on weekends from the beginning of May until October, and also on weekdays in July and August. It is the highest narrow-gauge line in Poland.

The main station with all the rolling stock is located in Majdan near Cisna.

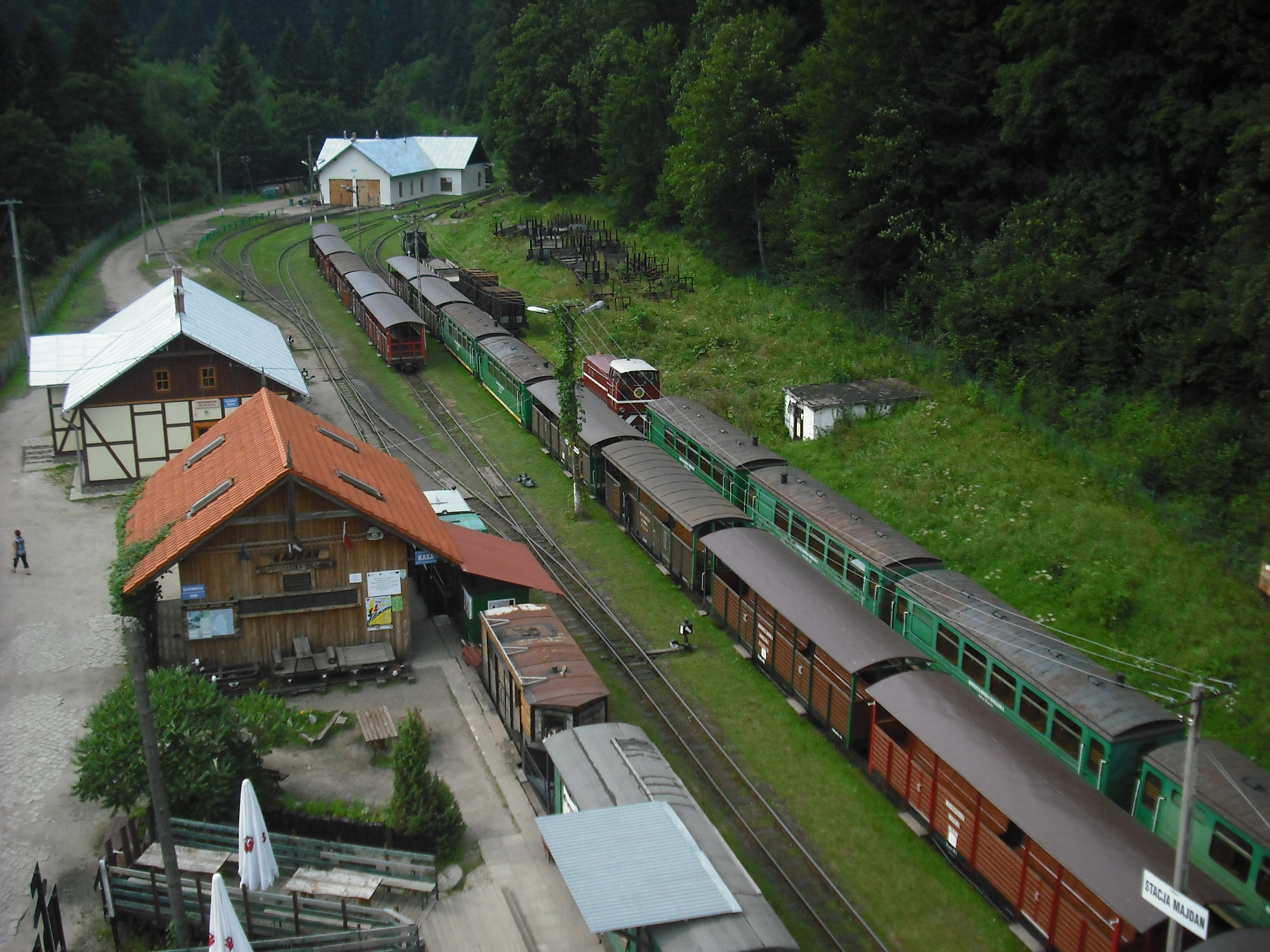
Majdan train station

== History ==
Construction of a narrow-gauge railway in the Bieszczady mountains started in 1890, when Galicia was under Austro-Hungarian rule. Its main purpose was to make forest exploitation easier, by linking the heart of Bieszczady with the standard-gauge First Hungarian-Galician Railway (Erste Ungarisch-Galizische Eisenbahn) in Nowy Łupków. The first line, 25 km long, led from Nowy Łupków eastwards to Cisna, mostly along the Solinka river valley, and was opened on 21 January 1898. The gauge initially was 760 mm. The railway was operated by kkStB, and there ran two pairs of mixed trains and a number of timber trains daily. The main depot and a terminal station was in Majdan (a settlement south of Cisna). In 1900-1909 there were built further private forest extensions from Majdan towards Kalnica, Beskid (part of Smerek) and Roztoki Górne. The line from Majdan had a different course, than today, and was getting round Cisna center.

During World War I the railway was used by the Austro-Hungarian army, and was largely destroyed. In 1918, after Poland had regained independence, the railway was taken over by Polish State Railways (PKP). During the economic crisis in the 1930s, its importance decreased and private extensions towards Kalnica, Smerek and Roztoki Górne were disassembled. During World War II and the German occupation, the railway was taken over by German Ostbahn. It was modernized, and the gauge was changed to the current 750 mm. During East Front fighting in 1944, and subsequent fighting with the Ukrainian Insurgent Army, the railway was demolished, and tracks and sleepers were removed in many places or damaged by tanks.

After the war, the Bieszczady mountains got deserted due to the forced resettlement of Ukrainian population, and PKP railways lost interest in renewing operation. By 1953 the line was handed over to State Forests administration (Lasy Państwowe), and subsequently it was rebuilt to serve as a timber railway. By the 1960s it was enlarged: towards the north-west to Mików (linking it with a former private railway to Rzepedź), and eastwards through Cisna to Wetlina and Moczarne. It was the highest narrow-gauge line in Poland. A total length was 73 km The main depot was still in Majdan near Cisna. In 1963, a limited passenger traffic began, mainly for tourists coming to the Bieszczady – it was the only public railway in Poland beside Polish State Railways at that time. Passenger volume reached over 21,000 in 1965. From the late 1970s, a steam traction was replaced with diesel locomotives PKP class Lyd2. Due to a competition from a road transport, a deep economic crisis in the 1980s and then Poland's difficult transition to a market economy in the 1990s, the railway, still operated by State Forests, fell into financial difficulties, and ceased operation by December 1994. Its infrastructure and part of the rolling stock were preserved thanks to placing the railway in the National Monument Registry in 1992. The most eastward extension from Wetlina to Moczarne was included into a strict preservation area of the Bieszczady National Park.

== Restoration as a heritage railway ==
Thanks to efforts of local authorities, community and railroad workers, the Bieszczady Forest Railway Foundation was created in 1996 and it took over the railway operation as a tourist attraction, on a shortened track. It acquired its current name Bieszczadzka Kolejka Leśna (lit. Bieszczady Light Forest Railway), which had been its popular designation before. From 4 July 1997 the trains started to run on an 11-km route from Majdan eastwards to Przysłup. From the following year, the trains also ran westwards to Balnica and further to Wola Michowa (17 km). For some time the trains ran even to Smolnik, but eventually Balnica became the last station, and the westward route was shortened to 9 km. Soon the renewed railway became the major tourist attraction in the Bieszczady, which were a popular tourist destination again. It runs several times a day in the summer season starting from May to September, and occasionally in other months; it is also possible to hire a special train. Due to a landfall near Przysłup, eastward track was shortened to Dołżyca from 2020.

From 2007, it regularly carried over 50,000 passengers a year, and from 2014 over 100,000 passengers. In 2018 it broke a barrier of 150,000 passengers, and in 2021, in spite of a pandemic, it carried a record 168,100 passengers. From 2017, it gained a position of one of two most popular narrow-gauge railways in Poland (along with Seaside Narrow-Gauge Railway), and in some years it was the most popular one (2017-2018, 2020).

In 2007, the railway operated four diesel locomotives Lyd2 class and 15 passenger wagons, open and closed. Then there were added two steam locomotives, Las and Kp4 classes (not available in all years).
