= Great Bieszczady Loop Road =

Road in Poland

Great Bieszczady Loop Road is a common name for an automobile and bicycle tourist route in the Polish part of the Carpathians and Sanocko-Turczańskie Mountains.

The road begins at Lesko. Sections of the route are as follows:

- Voivodeship road 893: Lesko – Hoczew – Baligród – Cisna
- Voivodeship road 897: Cisna – Wetlina – Ustrzyki Górne (with a road to Wołosate )
- Voivodeship road 896: Ustrzyki Górne – Smolnik – Czarna – Ustrzyki Dolne,
- National road 84: Ustrzyki Dolne – Lesko.

The road is 144 kilometres (89 mi). The road offers views of the mountains and connects the villages with historical monuments and tourist attractions. It runs through Ciśniańsko-Wetliński Landscape Park, Bieszczady National Park, San Valley Landscape Park and Nature Park Słonne Mountains.
