= Hoczewka =

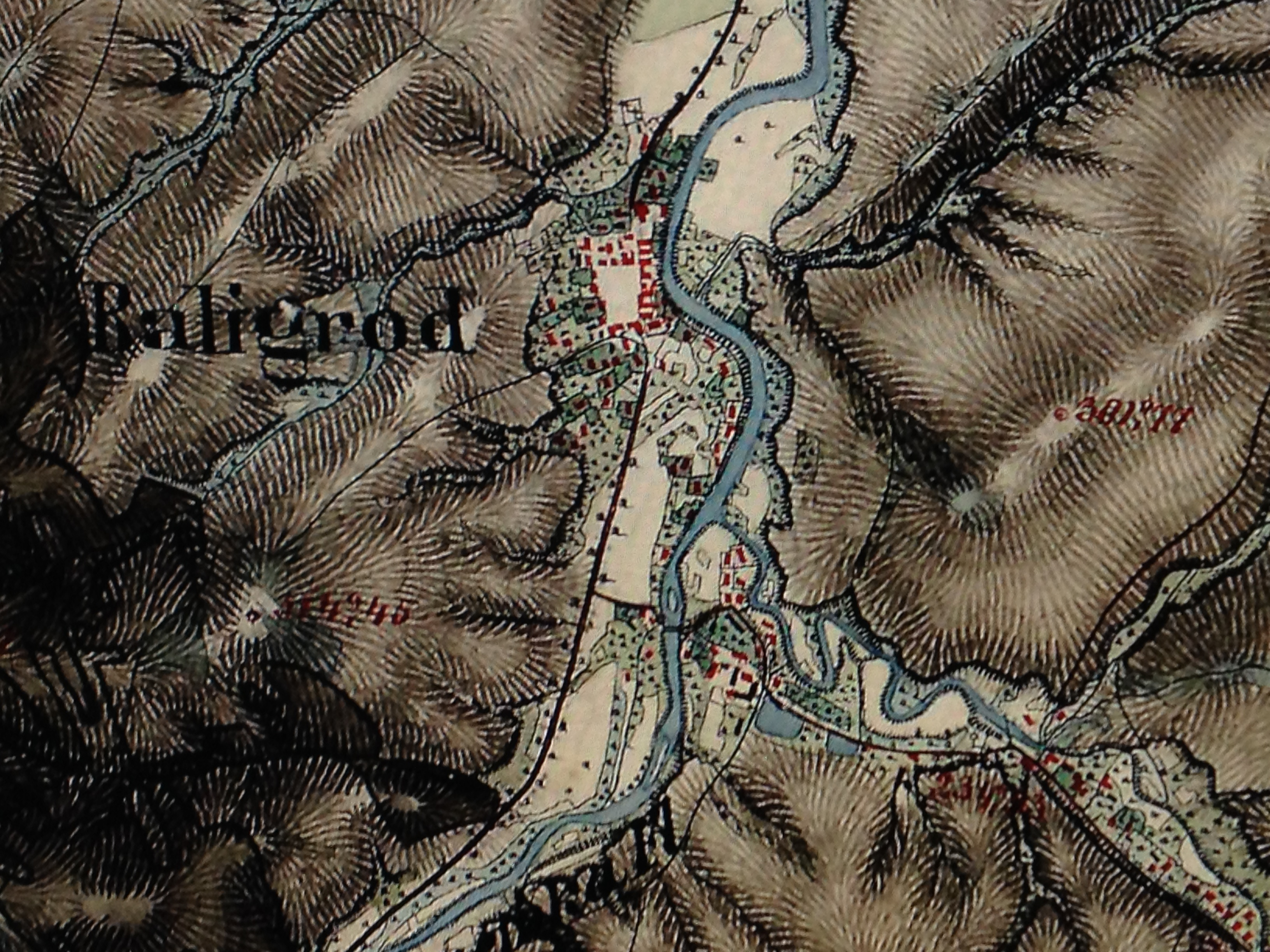

Location
- Country: Poland
- Voivodeship: Podkarpackie
- County (Powiat): Lesko

Physical characteristics
- Source: Slope of Wołosań
  - location: northwest of Habkowce, Gmina Cisna
  - coordinates: 49°14′29″N 22°17′39″E
  - elevation: 980 m (3,220 ft)
- Mouth: San
  - location: Hoczew, Gmina Lesko
  - coordinates
  - elevation: 230 m (750 ft)
- Length: 27.8 km (17.3 mi)
- Basin size: 180.1 km^{2} (69.5 mi^{2})
- Discharge
  - location: Hoczew
  - average: 3.1 m^{3}/s (110 cu ft/s)

Basin features
- Progression: San→ Vistula→ Baltic Sea

Hoczewka is a right tributary of the San River in southeastern Poland. It flows for 27.8 kilometres, and joins the San near Hoczew.
