= Przysłup, Podkarpackie Voivodeship =

Przysłup
- Village
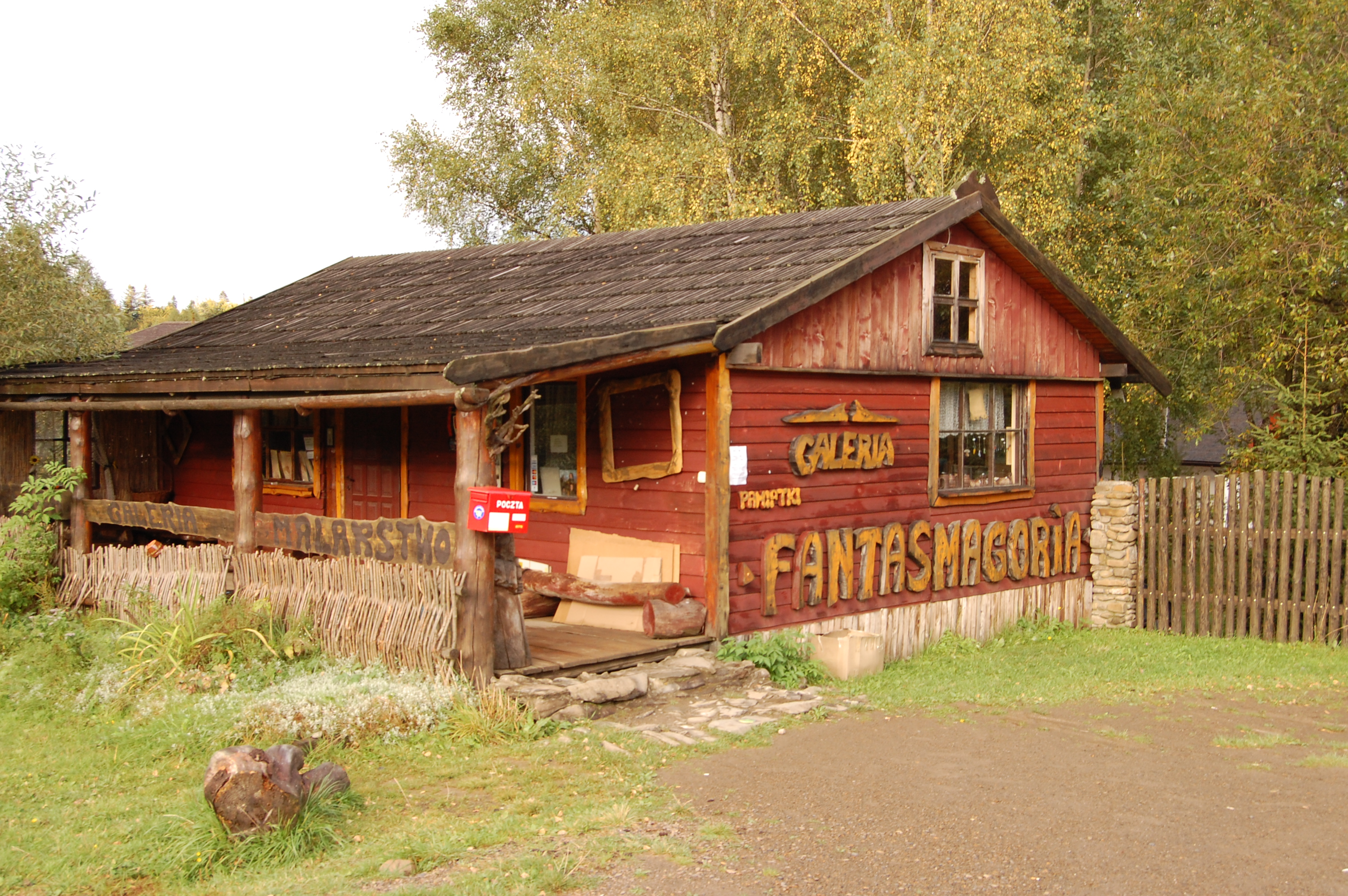
- Folk art gallery in Przysłup

- Location within Poland
- Coordinates: 49°11′13″N 22°22′51″E
- Country: Poland
- Voivodeship: Subcarpathian
- County: Lesko
- Gmina: Cisna
- Population: 70

Przysłup [ˈpʂɨswup] is a village in the administrative district of Gmina Cisna, within Lesko County, Subcarpathian Voivodeship, in south-eastern Poland, close to the border with Slovakia.

The village is situated by the grand Bieszczady loop road and is a popular tourist place, with inns and folk art galleries. There is an ending station of Bieszczadzka Forest Railway in Przysłup.
