= Majdan, Lesko County =

Majdan
- Village
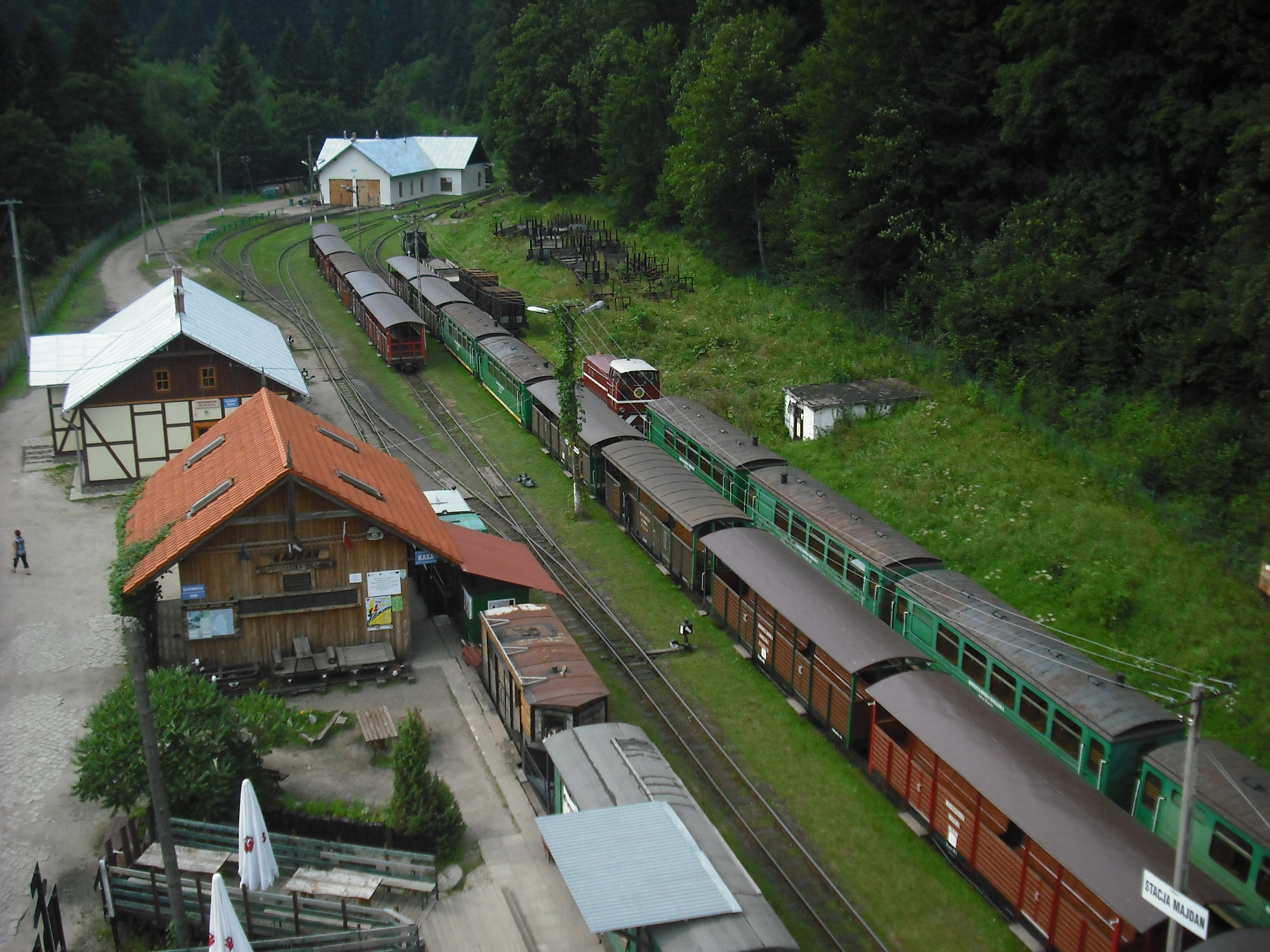

- Location within Poland
- Coordinates: 49°12′21″N 22°17′50″E
- Country: Poland
- Voivodeship: Subcarpathian
- County: Lesko
- Gmina: Cisna
- Population: 100

Majdan (Polish pronunciation: [ˈmajdan]) is a hamlet, a part of Cisna village, in the administrative district of Gmina Cisna, within Lesko County, Subcarpathian Voivodeship, in south-eastern Poland, close to the border with Slovakia.

In Majdan there is a main station and depot of Bieszczadzka Forest Railway.
