= Smerek (disambiguation) =

Smerek may refer to:

- Smerek, Podkarpackie Voivodeship, village in Poland
- Smerek (mountain), mountain in Western Bieszczady Mountains, Poland, see Ancient and Primeval Beech Forests of the Carpathians and Other Regions of Europe
- Smerek (river), river in Western Bieszczady Mountains, Poland
- Smerek (surname)
