= Zygmunt Kaczkowski =

Polish writer, independence activist and Austrian spy

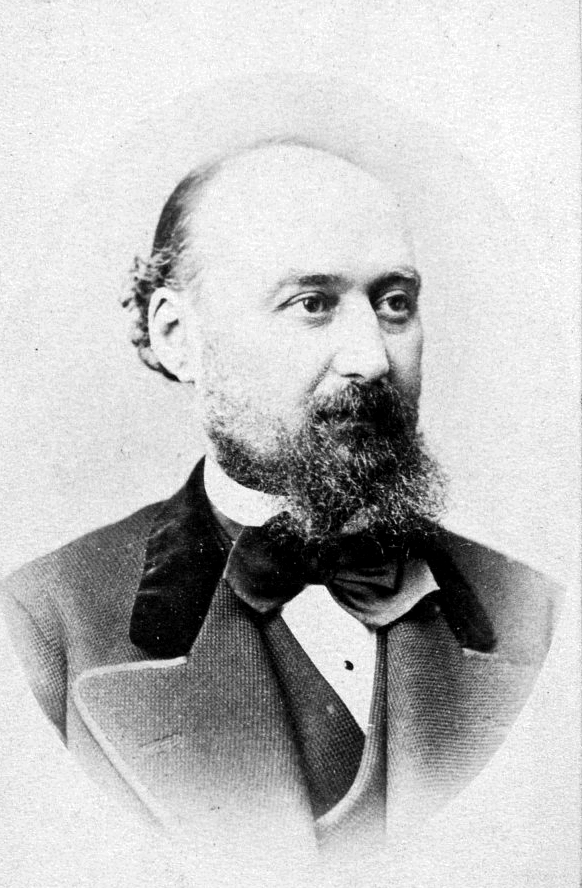

Zygmunt Kaczkowski (1825–1896) was a Polish writer, independence activist, and an Austrian spy. He was convicted in 1864 of espionage by an underground court in the January Uprising. There is a consensus that this accomplished writer is today a forgotten figure of Polish literature, virtually erased from national consciousness (one of the "absent greats"—wielcy nieobecni).

== Biography ==
Zygmunt, Józef, Erazm of three names Kaczkowski was born in Kamionka Wołoska (now in Ukraine) to Ignacy Kaczkowski and Franciszka née Niklewicz. (Note: Geographical Dictionary of the Kingdom of Poland gives Bereźnica Wyżna as his birthplace.)

He has been described as one of the "absent greats" of Polish literature, an able writer across several genres, including the gawęda szlachecka. One of the most important works of Kaczkowski was Olbrachtowi rycerze ("Olbracht's Knights"; Paris, 1889), a historical novel in three volumes written, it is said, in response to the famous Trilogy of Henryk Sienkiewicz, a writer with whom in his day he was esteemed as an equal. Although published in his mature period, Olbrachtowi rycerze was likely written when Kaczkowski was in his twenties. In his early teens he penned a dissertation on Cicero in Latin, his first literary work, and when about 20 wrote a drama in five acts. Kaczkowski's remarkable faithfulness to the regional, detailed, ungeneralised realities of the szlachta whose life he depicted having been a merit noticed and praised by informed readers, one that made him sensationally sought after as a publicist at an early age and nationally famous as the author of some fifty books before he reached the age of 32. Kaczkowski was the editor-in-chief of a Lwów daily, a town in which he had acquired a reputation for the number of mistresses he had.

Kaczkowski was also a secret agent working for years on end in the 1860s for the Imperial Austria, one of the Partitioning Powers. His cover was blown in December 1863 when a partly encrypted diplomatic cable sent from Lwów to the central government in Vienna by Count Mensdorff-Pouilly, the Austrian steward of Galicia, was intercepted at the Lwów post-office and deciphered by the Polish underground, supposedly revealing the surname "Kaczkowski" (encoded with a monoalphabetic substitution cipher, without the first name being indicated) in the context of certain payments to be made to a person of that name. Although ready to defend himself, Kaczkowski was put on trial in absentia by the provincial Lwów organs of the insurrectionist Provisional National Government of Poland—his judges unwilling to confront him face to face and thereby to reveal their identities—in seeming violation of the principle audi alteram partem of natural justice. By this authority, and in this way, he was declared guilty of espionage and sentenced to banishment from all Polish lands ("on pain of death") in January 1864, at the age of 38. Kaczkowski complied and left Polish territory within four days, as commanded by the writ of the sentence, but he never ceased to maintain his innocence, vigorously denying the charges levelled against him even in print, that the degree of harm caused by defamation was "exponentially proportional to the degree of fame originally enjoyed by the victim". Indeed, the verdict against him was itself very promptly rescinded on appeal by the highest organs of the (underground) national government in Warsaw, and although a review of the case never took place, he lived out his days, chiefly in Paris, a man exonerated by default.

After his death, on his tombstone at the Champeaux cemetery in Montmorency there were inscribed, in Polish and in French, the words: "A combattu toute sa vie par la plume pour la cause de sa Patrie" (All his life fought with his pen for his Fatherland). However, after the collapse of the Habsburg monarchy in the following century, during the interbellum period when the secret archives of the state by then no longer in existence were finally opened to researchers, his role as a secret agent for the Austrians was indeed unequivocally demonstrated by the documents in his dossier examined by Eugeniusz Barwiński, the results of whose investigations were published in book form in 1920.

There is a consensus of opinion that this accomplished writer is today a forgotten figure of Polish literature, virtually erased from national consciousness (one of the "absent greats"—wielcy nieobecni), on account of the non-literary aspects of his biography.

== Literature ==
- Adam Krechowiecki, Zygmunt Kaczkowski i jego czasy: na podstawie źródeł i materyałów rękopiśmiennych ("Zygmunt Kaczkowski and His Times: Based on Original Sources and Manuscripts"), Lwów, Zakład Narodowy im Ossolińskch, 1918
