= Hoczew =

- Village
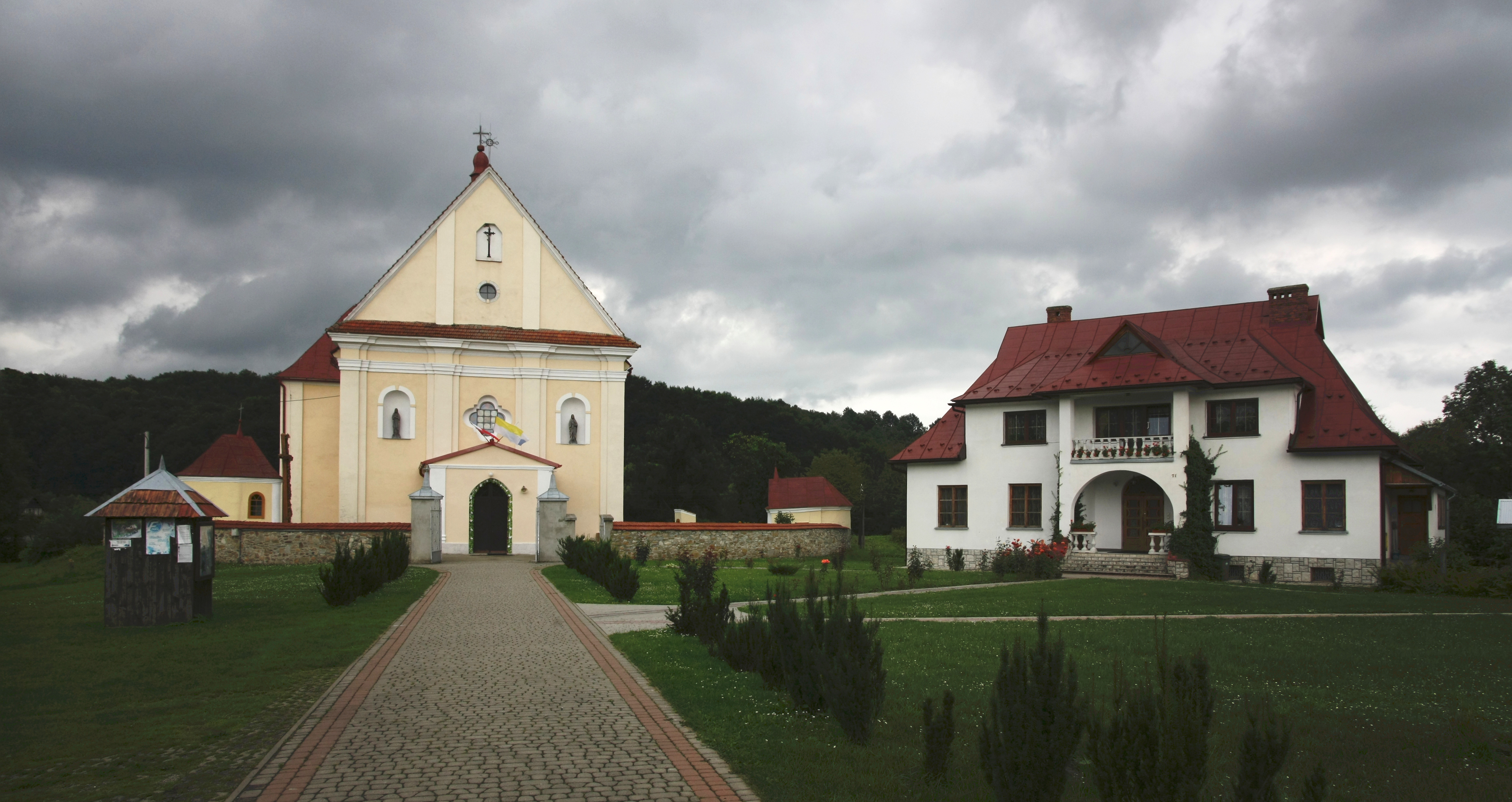
- Saint Anne's Church

- Location within Poland
- Coordinates: 49°26′N 22°19′E
- Country: Poland
- Voivodeship: Subcarpathian
- County: Lesko
- Gmina: Lesko
- Population: 710

Hoczew [ˈxɔt͡ʂɛf] is a large village in the administrative district of Gmina Lesko, within Lesko County, Subcarpathian Voivodeship, in south-eastern Poland.

== Etymology ==
The etymology of the town's name is unclear; it might have pre-Slavic origins.

== Location and characteristics ==
The village is located at the point where the Hoczewka flows into the San and at the fork of two roads, leading from Baligród and Polańczyk, from a single road leading from Lesko. It is linked by bus with Lesko, Sanok, Cisna, Wetlina, and Polańczyk. Features of the town include a post office, a bar, and Salamandra, a hotel. Many of its inhabitants work in Lesko or Sanok.

=== Attractions ===
The most important monument of Hoczew is the parish church, dedicated to Saint Anne, consecrated in 1745 by Wacław Sierakowski, the Bishop of Przemyśl. It is an example of Baroque architecture. A late 17th century painting of the Virgin and Child with Saint Anne is contained within, and the oldest relic is the gravestone of Matiasz III Bał, a nobleman who died in 1576.

A 19th-century former clergy house is found on the road to nearby Dziurdowo, housing a collection of various items collected by local teacher Zdzisław Pękalski (d. 1941). Today, it is an art gallery. Close to this location, a tavern known as the Kazimierzówna was located, but fell into disrepair and was demolished. In the northern half of the village, a Roman Catholic cemetery is located. Near the village, on the road to Baligród, a hard-to-access natural monument is found, a series of knickpoints on the Hoczewka.

== History ==
The oldest sign of human habitation in Hoczew is a gorod from the 9th and 10th centuries, found atop a hill near the confluence of the San and Hoczewka. Its location and size imply a defensive, and not residential, function. The first mention of Hoczew itself comes from 1400, when it was owned by the local judge in Sanok, Jaczek. In 1427, Hoczew and most of the lands around the Hoczewka became part of the property of Matiasz ze Zboisk, a local noble. He was the progenitor of the Bal family.

The earliest church in Hoczew existed as early as 1424. In 1510, Mikołaj Bal, an official from Sanok, funded the construction of the first Church of Saint Anne. A small castle in Hoczew is mentioned in 1493. After Mikołaj's death, his sons, Matiasz III and Stanisław, converted to Calvinism. After the death of the previous parish priest, they did not allow a new priest to take charge in the parish of Hoczewka. By order of the bishop of Przemyśl, they were cursed, the Catholic Church's lands were retaken by the institution, and they were tried by a secular court, although not convicted of any offence.

The Bals lost Hoczew in the early 17th century, following the marriage of Zofia Balówna with the voivode of Podolia, Stanisław Bełżecki. As of the early 18th century, it was owned by the Urbański family (the owners of Lutowiska), and from 1740 onwards, it was owned by the Fredro family. Their most notable member was the writer Aleksander Fredro.

=== Historical demographics (1921) ===
As of 1921, 848 people lived in the 144 homes of Hoczew. Of the 848 inhabitants, 470 were Greek Catholics, 310 were Roman Catholics, and 59 were Jews.
