= Eska Rock =

Coordinates: 52°14′11″N 21°06′50″E

- Poland
- Frequency: see in section FM frequencies in Poland
- RDS: EskaROCK

Programming
- Language: Polish
- Format: Modern rock, mainstream rock, indie rock, alternative rock

Ownership
- Owner: ZPR Media Group
- Sister stations: Radio Eska

History
- First air date: November 22, 2004
- Former frequencies: see in section FM frequencies in Poland

Links
- Webcast: Live stream
- Website: eskarock.pl

Eska Rock (often stylized as Eska ROCK) is a Polish radio channel broadcast by Grupa Radiowa Time. The station plays mainly modern rock, indie rock and alternative rock, from "classic" rock songs, to the newest "hits".

Eska Rock started broadcasting in Poznań on 22 November 2004, in Łódź and Warsaw on 5 September 2005 and in Kraków on 20 March 2006. From 2 June 2008 to 1 December 2013, Eska Rock broadcast in 18 Polish cities. On 2 December 2013, the frequencies on which Eska Rock broadcast were switched with the frequencies of another station owned by Grupa Radiowa Time, VOX FM. Since then until 2 July 2024, Eska Rock was broadcast only in Warsaw at 93.3 MHz. On 27 March 2024 Eska Rock's owner acquired its competitor Muzo.fm from Telewizja Polsat and requested KRRiT to change its name to Eska ROCK and at the same time to rename the station broadcasting locally in Warsaw to Eska ROCK Warszawa. On 2 July 2024 Muzo.fm was shut down with Eska Rock taking its place.

Eska Rock headquarters were located in Primate's Palace, Warsaw, until in 2010 the station moved to 10, Jubilerska Street in Warsaw.

== FM frequencies in Poland ==
Frequencies currently used by Eska Rock:

- Bydgoszcz – 90.5 MHz
- Gdańsk – 93.9 MHz
- Kielce – 92.9 MHz
- Kraków – 104.9 MHz
- Łódź – 102.3 MHz
- Olsztyn – 92.4 MHz
- Poznań – 93.9 MHz
- Warsaw – 93.3 MHz (broadcasting under the name Eska ROCK Warszawa), 102 MHz
- Wrocław – 103.7 MHz

Frequencies on which Eska Rock broadcast from 2 June 2008 to 1 December 2013:

- Białystok – 88.6 MHz
- Gdańsk – 104.4 MHz
- Gdynia – 105.6 MHz
- Katowice – 95.5 MHz
- Kielce – 95.5 MHz
- Koszalin – 95.4 MHz
- Kraków – 107.0 MHz
- Lublin – 106.1 MHz
- Łódź – 97.9 MHz
- Olsztyn – 94.7 MHz
- Płock – 90.4 MHz
- Poznań – 107.4 MHz (local broadcast)
- Rzeszów – 97.1 MHz
- Szczecin – 95.7 MHz
- Siedlce – 91.3 MHz
- Warsaw – 104.4 MHz
- Wetlina – 87.6 MHz
- Wrocław – 101.5 MHz
- Zielona Góra – 95.3 MHz
- Kalnica – 87.6 MHz (planned, but not used in the end)

== Eska Rock staff ==
=== Management ===
- Zbigniew Frączek – director of program
- Darek Król – head of music
- Marta Niedzielska – director of promotion
- Małgorzata "Małgo" Wierzejewska – secretary of editorial staff

=== Producers ===
- Daniel Walczak

=== Presenters ===
- Agnieszka "Hi Szkuta" Szkuta
- Małgorzata "Małgo" Wierzejewska
- Basia "Barbra" Klaman
- Jacek Niewęgłowski
- Michał "Majkel" Cieślik
- Darek Król
- Mariusz Nałęcz-Nieniewski
- Wiktor Brzozowski
- Dawid Zygmunt

=== Newsreaders ===
- Barbara "Barbra" Klaman
- Jacek Niewęgłowski
- Jarema Jamrożek

== Past Eska Rock staff ==
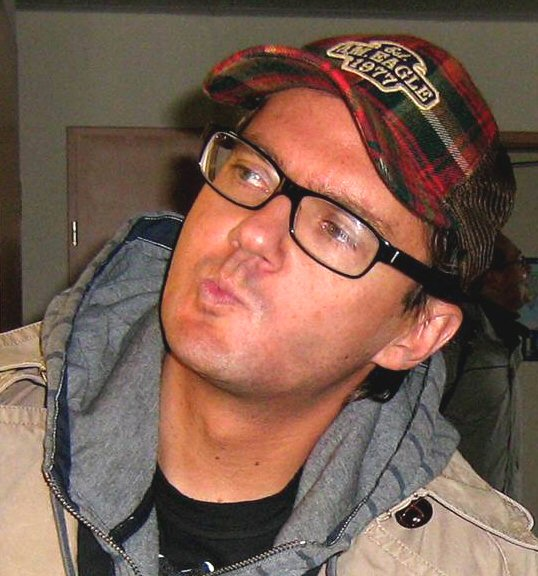
Kuba Wojewódzki, host of "Zwolnienie z WF-u" (2012–2013) and "Poranny WF" (2008–2012)

- Paweł Kostrzewa – director of program (2 June 2008 – 1 December 2008), host on "pROCKreacja".
- Marcin "Bisior" Bisiorek – director of program (1 December 2008 – November 2013), host on "Poduszkowiec" (Mondays, 9–11 pm) and "Gramy Co Chcemy Weekend"
- Jerzy Owsiak – host on "Dźwiękoszczelny Magazyn Jurka Owsiaka" (3 August 2008 – 4 April 2010)
- Kuba Wojewódzki – host on morning shows "Poranny WF", "Śniadanie Mistrzów" (28 January 2008 – 25 June 2012), and "Zwolnienie z WF-u" (June 2012 – December 2013)
- Michał Figurski – co-host on "Poranny WF" and "Śniadanie Mistrzów" (28 January 2008 – 25 June 2012)
- Czesław Mozil – co-host on "Zwolnienie z WF-u" (June 2012 – December 2013)
- Agnieszka Szulim – co-host on "Zwolnienie z WF-u" (June 2012 – December 2013)
- Maciej Stuhr – co-host on "Zwolnienie z WF-u" (June 2012 – 2013)
- Bartosz Węglarczyk – co-host on "Zwolnienie z WF-u" (September–November 2012)
- Jarosław "Jaro" Sobierajewicz – host on "Gramy Co Chcemy" in Poznań (local broadcast, Weekdays)
- Kamil Olszewski – executive producer and creative editor of "Zwolnienie z WF-u", host on "Poranna Rozgrzewka" (Weekdays, 6–10 am)
- Jarosław "Wendro" Wendrowski – host on "Gramy Co Chcemy" (Weekdays, 1–4 pm), "Gramy Co Chcemy Weekend"
- Idalia Tomczak – co-host on "Radar" (Weekdays, 4–7 pm)
- Konrad "Kondziu" Olszewszki – co-host on "Radar" (Weekdays, 4–7 pm), "Gramy Co Chcemy Weekend"
- Anna "Dobroć" Nowaczyk – co-host on "NRD Najlepsza Rockowa Dwudziestka" (Monday–Saturday, 7-9 pm), host on "Na Fali" (Thursdays, 9–11 pm)
- Robert ("Pegaz") Zawieja – co-host on "NRD Najlepsza Rockowa Dwudziestka" (Monday–Saturday, 7-9 pm), host on "Sanatorium" (Tuesdays, 9–11 pm)
- Radosław ("Radzio") Nałęcz – host on "Gramy Co Chcemy Weekend".
- Arkadiusz Frąckowiak – host on "Gracie Co Chcecie" (Weekdays, 11 pm–12 am)
- Mariusz "Misiek" Jankowski – host on "MiSie Podoba" (Wednesdays, 9–11 pm)
