= Kalnica =

Kalnica may refer to the following places:

- Kálnica, Slovakia
- Kalnica, Podlaskie Voivodeship (north-east Poland)
- Kalnica, Lesko County in Subcarpathian Voivodeship (south-east Poland)
- Kalnica, Sanok County in Subcarpathian Voivodeship (south-east Poland)
