= Aleksander Ostrowski =

Polish skier and mountaineer

Aleksander "Olek" Ostrowski
- Born: 11 January 1988; Wetlina, Poland
- Disappeared: 15 July 2015; Gasherbrum II
- Monuments: Polish Himalayan Memorial, Nepal; Tatra Symbolic Cemetery, Popradské Pleso; Olek Ostrowski Memorial Ski race
- Occupations: Skier and mountaineer
- Years active: 2004–2015
- Known for: First Polish ski descent from Cho Oyu, First Pole to ski Northern Face of Lenin Peak

Aleksander "Olek" Ostrowski (11 January 1988 – disappeared 25 July 2015) was a Polish skier and mountaineer.

== Early life and education ==
Ostrowski was born and grew up in Wetlina in the Bieszczady Mountains. He began skiing at age 3 and soon started to take part in FIS competitions. In 2004, he won the Open Podkarpacie Amateur Alpine Skiing Championships in carving and giant slalom. He then went to represent his region Subcarpathian Voivodeship in the Polish junior championships. In 2007, he graduated high school in Ustrzyki Dolne and went on to university studies in geography at Jagiellonian University in Kraków.

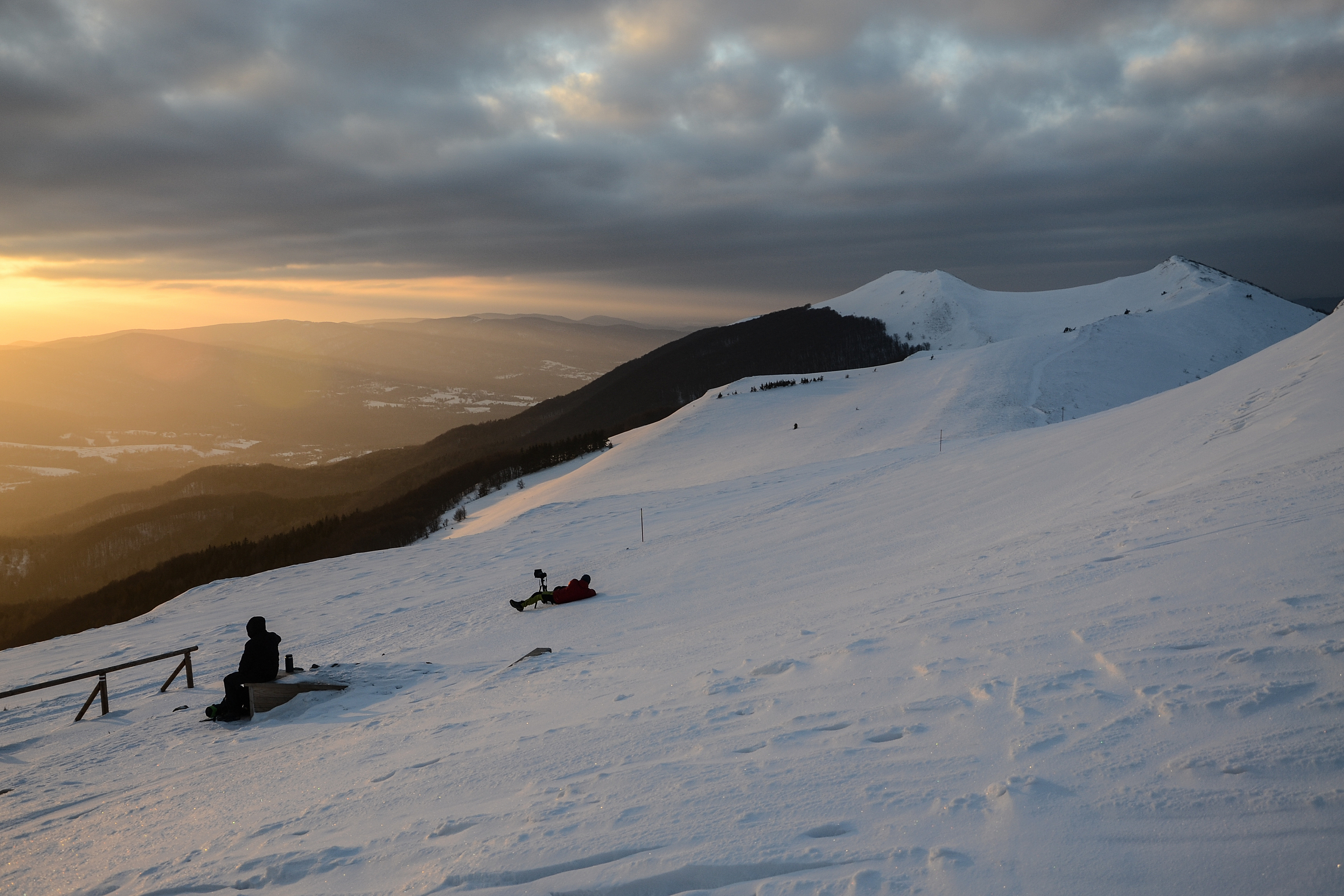
Poland's Bieszczady mountains, where Ostrowski grew up

Alongside his studies, he remained dedicated to the mountains. At university, he became a member of the Alpine club. In 2007, he became a certified mountain rescuer with Poland's prestigious Mountain Volunteer Search and Rescue based in Sanok.

He continued to compete successfully in alpine skiing competitions, and additionally went on to become a ski instructor and ultramarathon runner. He participated mostly in mountain runs, competing in numerous races in the Tatra Mountains.

== Mountaineering career ==
Ostrowski began alpine climbing close to home in Poland, first in the Tatras. He then went on to the Alps to climb Mont Blanc, the Matterhorn, and Grossglockner. Ostrowski combined his pastimes of climbing and skiing to become a skilled ski mountaineer and became notable for his ski descents. In 2012, he made a solo ski descent from the north face Lenin Peak (7134 m), becoming the first Pole to do so. Two years later in 2014, he joined a group expedition and became the first Pole to ski down Mount Kazbek (5 033 m).

Later that year, he organized a ski expedition funded by supporters via Polak Potrafi, a crowdfunding website, attempting to be the first Pole to ski Cho Oyo. On 29 September 2014 Ostrowski summited his first eight-thousander solo and then successfully skied down from the summit without the use of additional oxygen. In his descent, he set a new Polish altitude record for downhill skiing, and became the first Pole to ski Cho Oyu.

For his solo ascent and ski descent of Cho Oyu, he was awarded a "Kolosa Award", one of the year's highest honors from the Polish travel industry with distinction in Mountaineering. He later received the Trip of the Year award from National Geographic.

After summiting Cho Oyo, Ostrowski set his sights on another eight-thousander, Gasherbrum II in the Karakoram. Ostrowski again sought to climb without oxygen, and without the help of high-altitude porters, and be the first to Pole to ski down from the summit. He again turned to crowdfunding to support the climb, successfully raising PLN 50,316 for the expedition, 125% of the project's goal. Alongside Piotr Śnigórski, a photographer, ski instructor and climber, the two began their climb on 21 July 2015. After two days of climbing, Śnigórski and Ostrowski reached Camp 3, and by 24 July they made their push towards the summit. After hours of climbing in heavy snow, Ostrowski and Śnigórski abandoned their summit attempt on 25 July after reaching 7,600 meters.

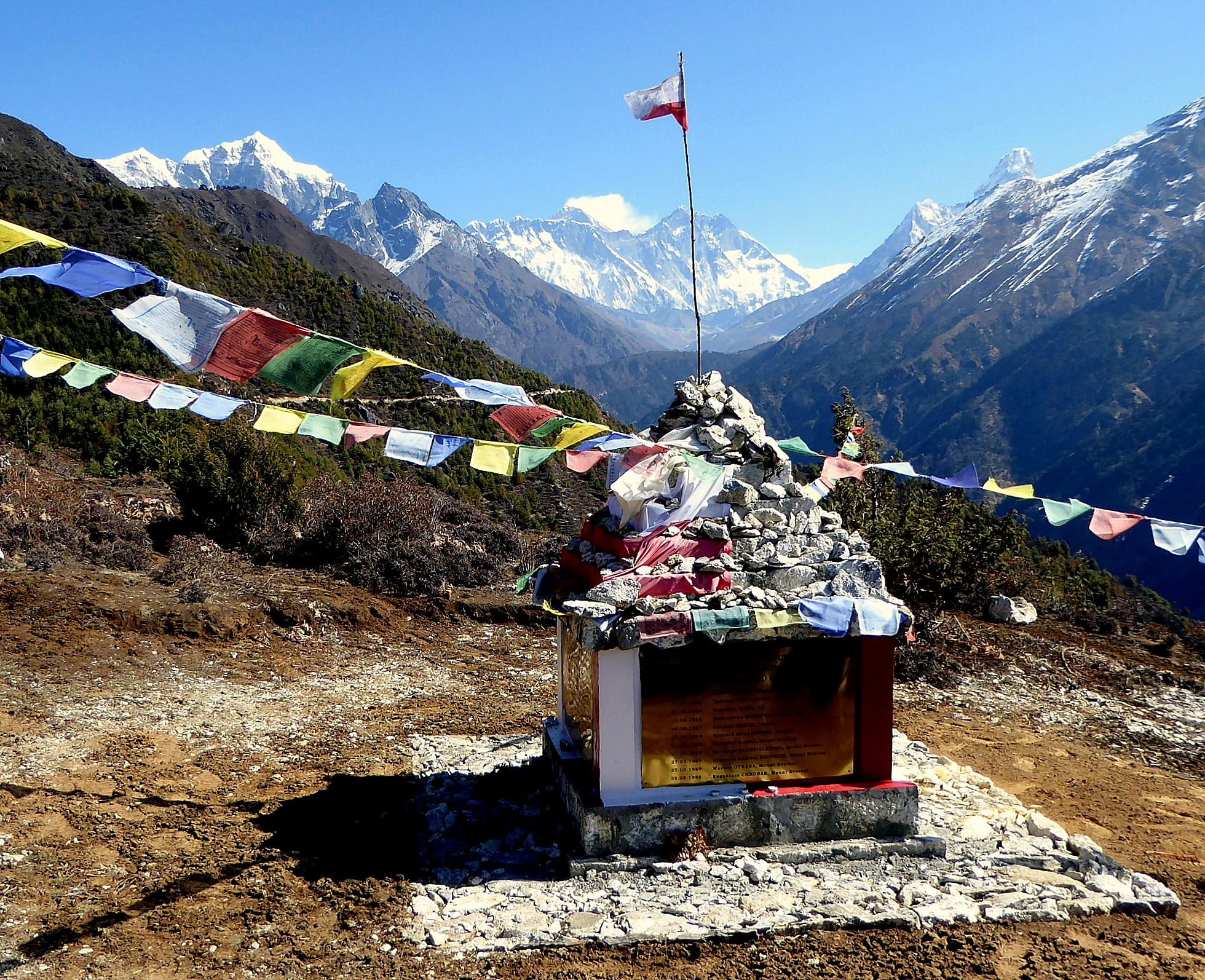
Memorial of Polish Himalayan Mountaineers, Namche Bazaar, Nepal

As they made their way down, Ostrowski went missing while descending from camp two to camp one, possibly due to falling in a crevasse. On 26 July high-altitude porters went to search for Ostrowski. Upon hearing the news, countrymen Andrzej Bargiel and Darek Załuski, came to base camp to support search activities, despite summitting Broad Peak days earlier. According to statements by Bargiel, he pleaded with officers for hours to allow him to search for the missing climber, only to be denied as Pakistan's military closed the mountain. On 27 July the search was called off. No sign of Ostrowski has ever been found.

== Memorials ==
Following his death, his family and his fellow mountain rescue colleagues organized an annual sports competition for alpine skiers in his memory. The event has become one of the most prominent alpine competitions for young skiers as well as alpine mountain rescue personnel in Poland. In 2024, the 6th edition of the event was held in his local Bieszczaldy Mountains.

On 11 November 2016 a plaque dedicated to his memory was unveiled at the Tatra Symbolic Cemetery on the western slopes of Ostrva in the High Tatras. He is also commemorated on the Polish Himalayan Memorial in Namche Bazaar, Nepal alongside the names of other Polish climbers who have been lost in the Himalayas.
