= Terka =

- Village
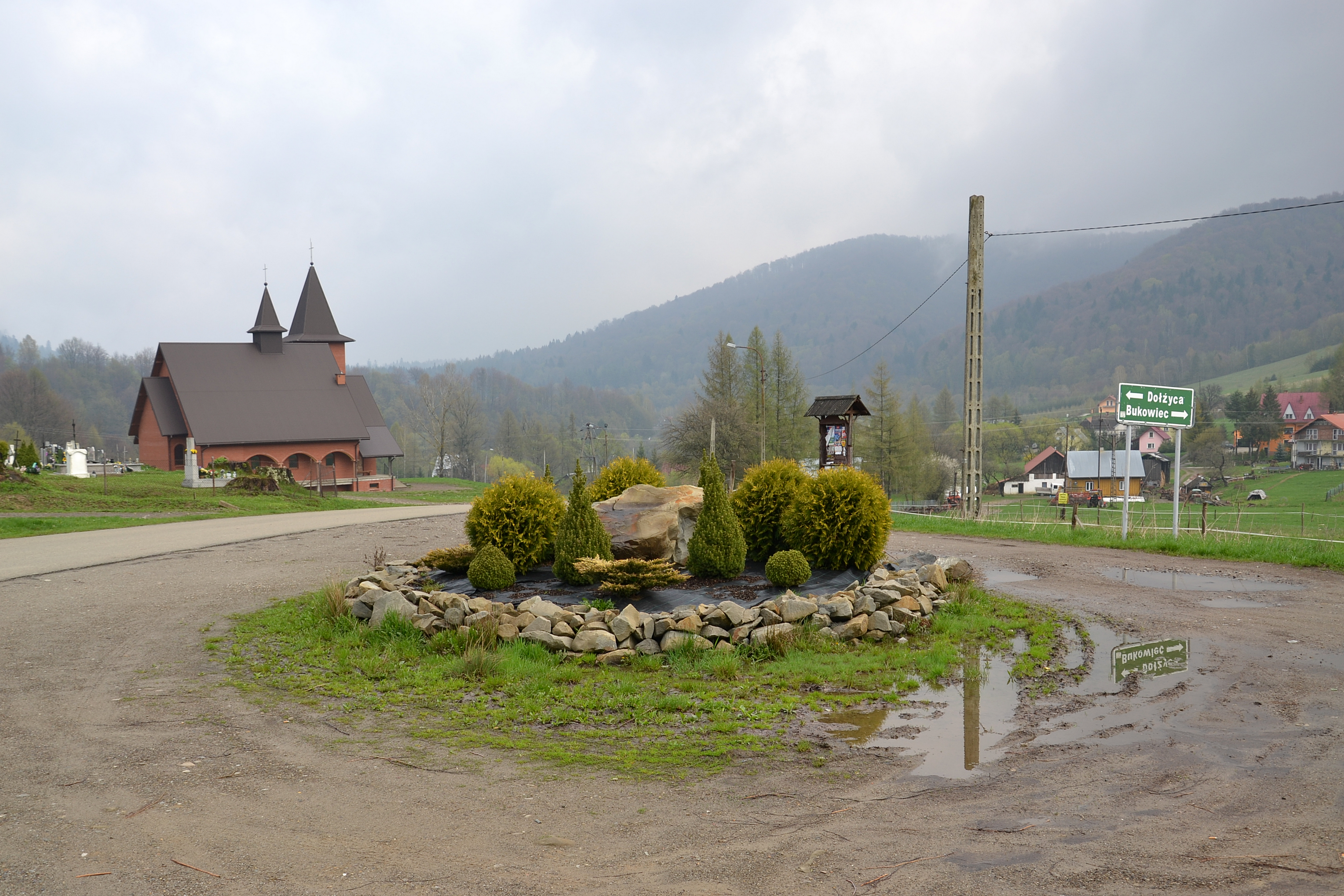

- Location within Poland
- Coordinates: 49°18′N 22°26′E
- Country: Poland
- Voivodeship: Subcarpathian
- County: Lesko
- Gmina: Solina
- Population: 190

Terka [ˈtɛrka] is a village in the administrative district of Gmina Solina, within Lesko County, Subcarpathian Voivodeship, in south-eastern Poland.
