= Rybne, Podkarpackie Voivodeship =

Rybne
- Village
- Location within Poland
- Coordinates: 49°20′32″N 22°24′06″E
- Country: Poland
- Voivodeship: Subcarpathian
- County: Lesko
- Gmina: Solina

Rybne ([ˈrɨbnɛ]) is a village in the administrative district of Gmina Solina, within Lesko County, Subcarpathian Voivodeship, in south-eastern Poland.
