= Bukowiec, Lesko County =

Bukowiec
- Village
- Location within Poland
- Coordinates: 49°18′35″N 22°24′35″E
- Country: Poland
- Voivodeship: Subcarpathian
- County: Lesko
- Gmina: Solina

Bukowiec [buˈkɔvʲɛt͡s] is a village in the administrative district of Gmina Solina, within Lesko County, Subcarpathian Voivodeship, in south-eastern Poland.
