= Zawój =

- Village
- Location within Poland
- Coordinates: 49°16′N 22°27′E
- Country: Poland
- Voivodeship: Subcarpathian
- County: Lesko
- Gmina: Cisna

Zawój [ˈzavui̯] is a village in the administrative district of Gmina Cisna, within Lesko County, Subcarpathian Voivodeship, in south-eastern Poland, close to the border with Slovakia.

The historical path "Bieszczady Odnalezione", opened on June 14, 2012, runs through Zawoya, leading through the villages of Yavorzec, Luh and Zawoya, which no longer exists. On its route there are bilingual plaques (in Polish and Ukrainian), indicating the boundaries of the villages, places left by Orthodox churches, cemeteries, wells with reconstructed sumps and cranes (visible along the road from Polanki to Kalnica) and cellars of former houses, as well as accounts collected by the Association for the Development of Wetlina and the Surrounding Area of the accounts of former residents of these villages, forcibly displaced in 1945–1947. Delineation of the historical path was intended to save from oblivion the last traces of former residents (Ukrainians, Poles and Jews) and to honor the memory of all those who had to leave their homes in the spring of 1947.
