= Buk, Podkarpackie Voivodeship =

Buk
- Village
- Location within Poland
- Coordinates: 49°14′42″N 22°23′30″E
- Country: Poland
- Voivodeship: Subcarpathian
- County: Lesko
- Gmina: Cisna

Population
  - Total: 50
- Postal code: 38-607
- Vehicle registration: RLS

Buk [buk] is a village in the administrative district of Gmina Cisna, within Lesko County, Subcarpathian Voivodeship, in south-eastern Poland, close to the border with Slovakia.
