= Berezka =

- Village
- Location within Poland
- Coordinates: 49°23′34″N 22°23′15″E
- Country: Poland
- Voivodeship: Subcarpathian
- County: Lesko
- Gmina: Solina

Berezka [bɛˈrɛska] is a village in the administrative district of Gmina Solina, within Lesko County, Subcarpathian Voivodeship, in south-eastern Poland.
