= Jawor, Gmina Solina =

Jawor
- Village
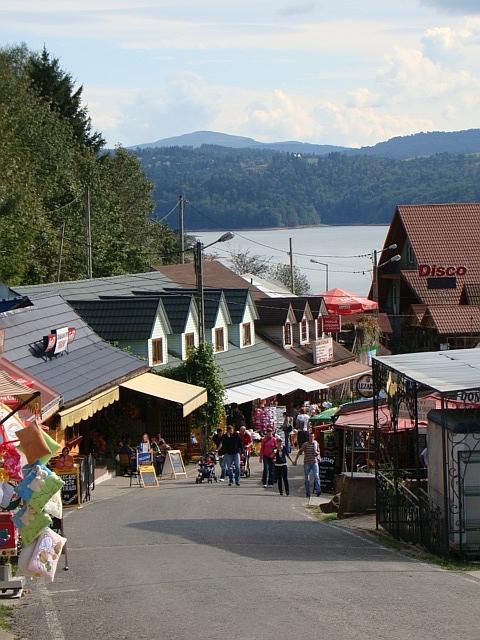

- Location within Poland
- Coordinates: 49°23′13″N 22°27′12″E
- Country: Poland
- Voivodeship: Subcarpathian
- County: Lesko
- Gmina: Solina

Jawor [ˈjavɔr] is a village in the administrative district of Gmina Solina, within Lesko County, Subcarpathian Voivodeship, in south-eastern Poland.
