= Zawóz =

- Village
- Location within Poland
- Coordinates: 49°21′N 22°27′E
- Country: Poland
- Voivodeship: Subcarpathian
- County: Lesko
- Gmina: Solina

Zawóz [ˈzavus] is a village in the administrative district of Gmina Solina, within Lesko County, Subcarpathian Voivodeship, in south-eastern Poland.
