= Krzywe, Lesko County =

Krzywe
- Village
- Location within Poland
- Coordinates: 49°11′33″N 22°21′32″E
- Country: Poland
- Voivodeship: Subcarpathian
- County: Lesko
- Gmina: Cisna
- Population: 50

Krzywe [ˈkʂɨvɛ] is a village in the administrative district of Gmina Cisna, within Lesko County, Subcarpathian Voivodeship, in south-eastern Poland, close to the border with Slovakia.
