= Wołkowyja =

- Village
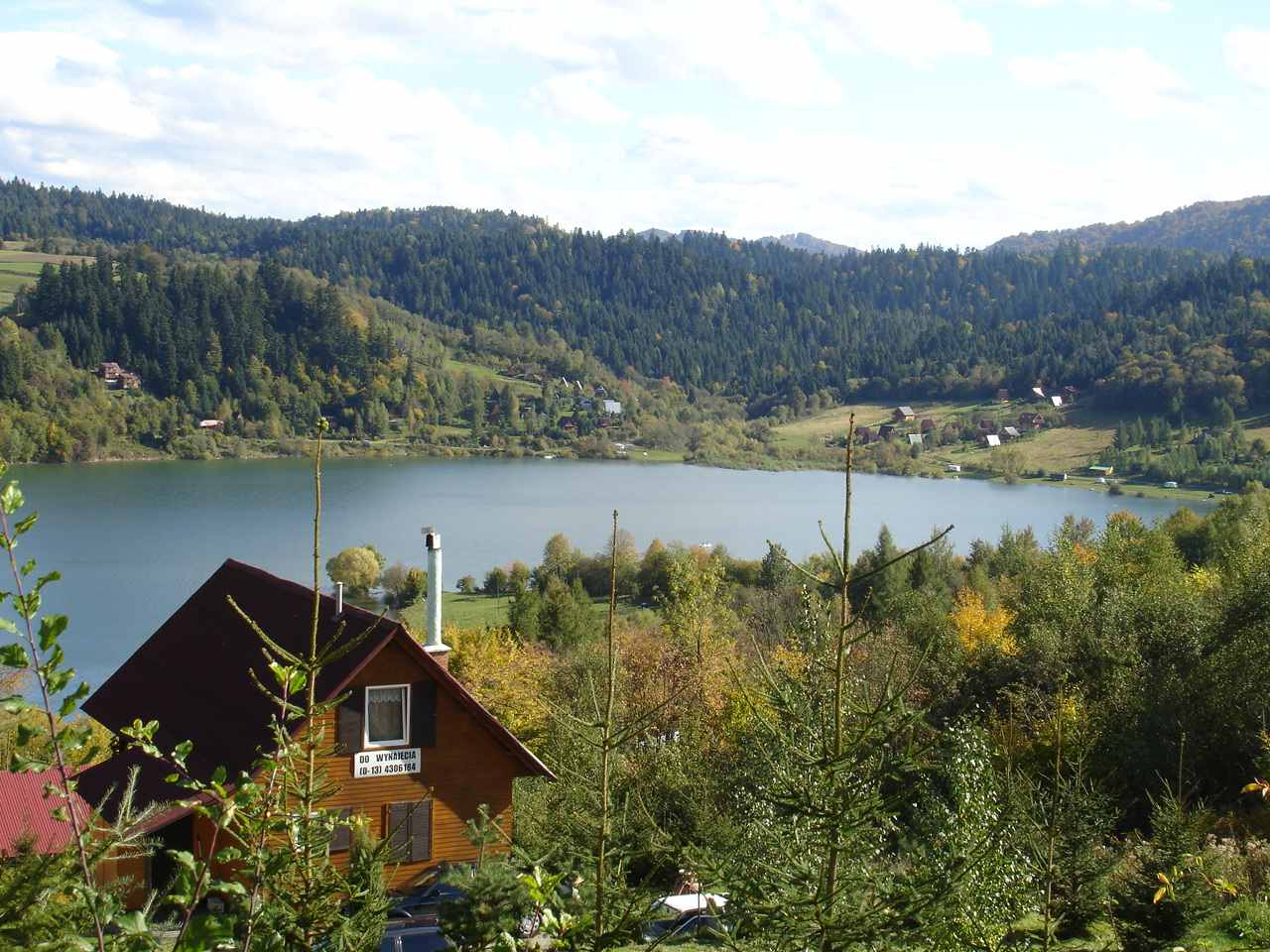
- Wołkowyja with Lake Solina

- Location within Poland
- Coordinates: 49°20′N 22°25′E
- Country: Poland
- Voivodeship: Subcarpathian
- County: Lesko
- Gmina: Solina
- Elevation: 460 m (1,510 ft)
- Population: 496
- Website: http://www.wolkowyja.eu

Wołkowyja [vɔu̯kɔˈvɨja] is a village in the administrative district of Gmina Solina, within Lesko County, Subcarpathian Voivodeship, in south-eastern Poland.
