= Myczków =

- Village
- Location within Poland
- Coordinates: 49°22′46″N 22°24′40″E
- Country: Poland
- Voivodeship: Subcarpathian
- County: Lesko
- Gmina: Solina

Myczków [ˈmɨt͡ʂkuf] is a village in the administrative district of Gmina Solina, within Lesko County, Subcarpathian Voivodeship, in south-eastern Poland.
