= LUH =

Luh or LUH may refer to:

== Places ==
- Velký Luh, a village and municipality in the Czech Republic
- Łuh, a village in Subcarpathian Voivodeship of Poland
- Luh, Velykyi Bereznyi Raion, a village in Velykyi Bereznyi Raion, Zakarpattia Oblast, Ukraine

== Other uses ==
- Leibniz University Hannover, Germany
- Light Utility Helicopter or Eurocopter UH-72 Lakota
- HAL Light Utility Helicopter
- LUH, a British-Dutch band featuring Ellery Roberts of WU LYF and Ebony Hoorn

== People with the surname ==
- Bor S. Luh (1916–2001), Chinese-born American food scientist
