= Liszna =

Liszna may refer to the following places:

- Liszna, Lublin Voivodeship (east Poland)
- Liszna, Lesko County in Subcarpathian Voivodeship (south-east Poland)
- Liszna, Sanok County in Subcarpathian Voivodeship (south-east Poland)
