= Roztoki Górne =

- Village
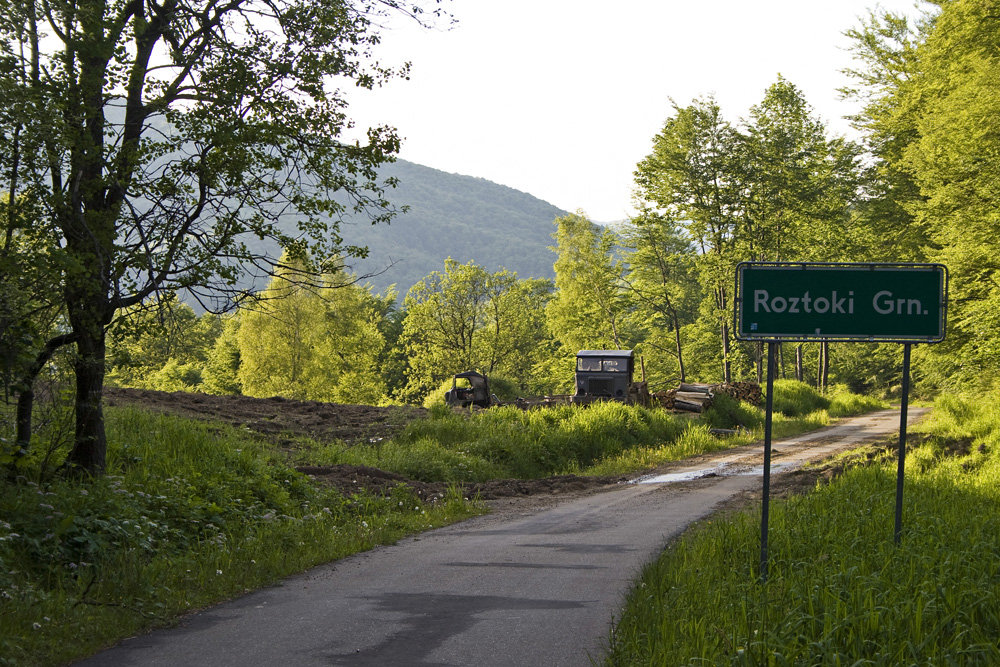

- Location within Poland
- Coordinates: 49°9′17″N 22°18′55″E
- Country: Poland
- Voivodeship: Subcarpathian
- County: Lesko
- Gmina: Cisna
- Elevation: 700 m (2,300 ft)
- Population: 16

Roztoki Górne [rɔsˈtɔkʲi ˈɡurnɛ] is a village in the administrative district of Gmina Cisna, within Lesko County, Subcarpathian Voivodeship, in south-eastern Poland, close to the border with Slovakia.
