= Smerek, Podkarpackie Voivodeship =

Smerek
- Village
- Location within Poland
- Coordinates: 49°10′36″N 22°26′1″E
- Country: Poland
- Voivodeship: Subcarpathian
- County: Lesko
- Gmina: Cisna
- Elevation: 644 m (2,113 ft)
- Population: 100

Smerek [ˈsmɛrɛk] is a village in the administrative district of Gmina Cisna, within Lesko County, Subcarpathian Voivodeship, in south-eastern Poland, close to the border with Slovakia.

Smerek station is a terminus of the Bieszczadzka Forest Railway.
