= Łuh =

- Village
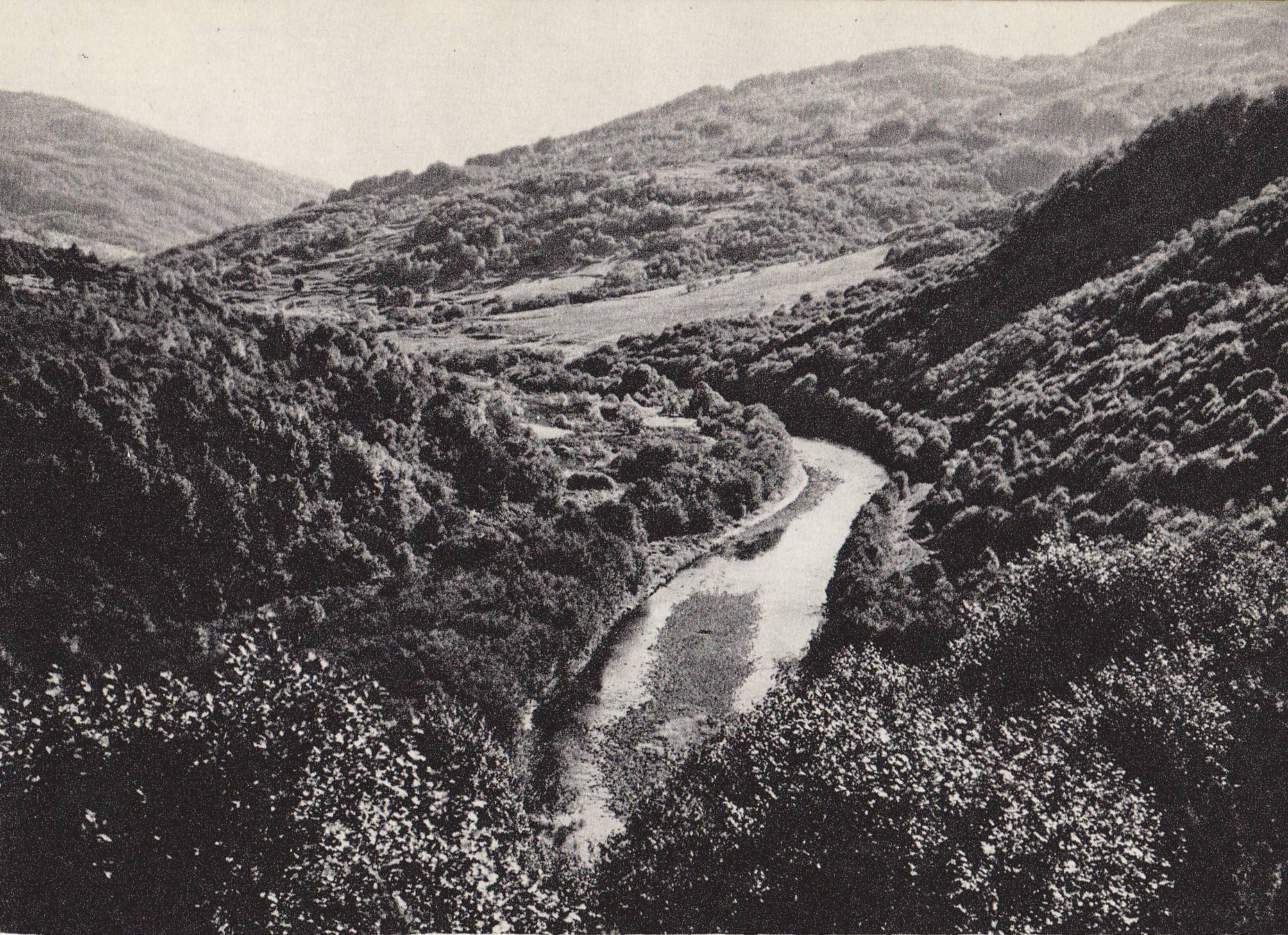

- Location within Poland
- Coordinates: 49°14′00″N 22°26′12″E
- Country: Poland
- Voivodeship: Subcarpathian
- County: Lesko
- Gmina: Cisna

Łuh [wux] is a village in the administrative district of Gmina Cisna, within Lesko County, Subcarpathian Voivodeship, in south-eastern Poland, close to the border with Slovakia.
