= Moczarne =

- Settlement
- Interactive map of Moczarne
- Location within Poland
- Coordinates: 49°6′40″N 22°31′14″E
- Country: Poland
- Voivodeship: Subcarpathian
- County: Lesko
- Gmina: Cisna

Moczarne [mɔˈt͡ʂarnɛ] is a settlement in the administrative district of Gmina Cisna, within Lesko County, Subcarpathian Voivodeship, in south-eastern Poland, close to the border with Slovakia.
