= Habkowce =

- Village
- Location within Poland
- Coordinates: 49°13′57″N 22°18′1″E
- Country: Poland
- Voivodeship: Subcarpathian
- County: Lesko
- Gmina: Cisna
- Population: 30

Habkowce [xapˈkɔft͡sɛ] is a village in the administrative district of Gmina Cisna, within Lesko County, Subcarpathian Voivodeship, in south-eastern Poland, close to the border with Slovakia.
