= Radio Eska =

Polish radio network

- Country: Poland
- Broadcast area: Poland
- Headquarters: Warsaw
- Branding: Hity na Czasie

Programming
- Format: CHR

Ownership
- Owner: ZPR Media Group
- Parent: Radio ESKA S.A.
- Sister stations: Eska Rock

History
- Founded: 1993

Coverage
- Stations: See list

Links
- Website: www.eska.pl

Radio Eska (stylised as Radio ESKA) is a commercial radio network in Poland. Part of the Time Radio Group, owned by the ZPR Media Group, Eska's sister stations include Eska Rock, Vox FM and Eska2. It is the third radio station in terms of listenership in Poland. The headquarters of Radio ESKA S.A. are located at 10 Jubilerska Street in Warsaw. Eska has organized Polish awards ceremony Eska Music Awards from 2002 until 2017.

== Chronology ==
=== Origins of broadcasting ===
Shortly after the fall of communism in Poland, radio stations with names such as 'Radio Eska' or 'Radio S' (phonetically Eska) appeared in three major Polish cities – Wrocław, Warsaw and Poznań, usually continuing the tradition of underground Solidarity radio stations from the communist era.

Despite the similar name and timing of their arrival on the market, the stations were initially formally independent of each other and set up on the initiative of different people. However, as early as 1993, the three then separate stations were taken over by the ZPR Media Group. In 1994, Eska Nord, a local station in the tricity area was established.

==== Independent stations ====
Radio Eska Wrocław started its full-time broadcast on 21 March 1993. In 1998, the station broadcast 36 news services per day and had a weekly listenership of around 250,000. Radio S in Poznań began broadcasting on 11 February 1991. The founder of the station and its director until 2000 was Krystyna Laskowicz, an activist of the anti-communist underground during the communist period.

Radio Eska Warszawa began broadcasting on 18 June 1990 (or 22 May 1990; disputed). At the beginning, the station had a journalistic character. However, competition in the market forced a slow transformation into a spoken word and music station. In the 1990s, the radio station broadcast mainly lighter rock and pop music and programmes featuring disco polo music, popular in Poland at the time, but also programmes featuring Russian songs, and one could also hear the hits of the 1960s, 1970s, 1980s and 1990s.

=== Creation of the national network ===
When the Radio Eska stations were taken over by the ZPR Media Group at the beginning of 1993, efforts were made to build a nationwide radio network on the basis of the radio stations they owned. The first step in this direction was the creation of the Super FM network, bringing together over a dozen local stations.

Eska Nord was not included in the emerging network. Instead, it was decided to build a completely new station Eska Trójmiasto on the basis of the previously acquired radio station, Radio ARnet. Due to the similarity of the names of the two stations, there was a dispute between the owners of the two stations, which was eventually resolved by changing the name of Radio Eska Trójmiasto to Hit FM. Radio Hit FM implemented the format of the Eska network, but because it had a different name to the rest of the stations on the network, it had a completely separate programme production team. This situation lasted until 2008, when Radio Eska Nord (which was taken over) changed its name to RMF Maxx Trójmiasto - this allowed ZPR to change the name of Radio Hit FM back to the earlier name Eska Trójmiasto.

== List of Eska stations ==
Currently, Eska's network consists of 44 local stations:

1. Radio ESKA Bełchatów – 89,4 MHz
2. Radio ESKA Beskidy – 97 MHz (broadcasting from Żywiec)
3. Radio ESKA Białystok – 90,6 MHz
4. Radio ESKA Braniewo – 100,7 MHz
5. Radio ESKA Bydgoszcz – 94,4 MHz
6. Radio ESKA Elbląg – 94,1 MHz
7. Radio ESKA Gorzów – 93,8 MHz
8. Radio ESKA Grudziądz – 90,6 MHz
9. Radio ESKA Iława – 89 MHz
10. Radio ESKA Jelenia Góra – 90,2 MHz
11. Radio ESKA Kielce – 103,3 MHz
12. Radio ESKA Koszalin:
  - Koszalin – 95,9 MHz
  - Kołobrzeg – 107,2 MHz
13. Radio ESKA Kraków – 97,7 MHz
14. Radio ESKA Kraśnik – 92,8 MHz
15. Radio ESKA Leszno – 102 MHz
16. Radio ESKA Lublin – 103,6 MHz
17. Radio ESKA Łomża – 88,8 MHz
18. Radio ESKA Łódź – 90,1 MHz
19. Radio ESKA Małopolska:
  - Bochnia – 106,8 MHz
  - Nowy Sącz – 106,8 MHz
  - Zakopane – 106,8 MHz
20. Radio ESKA Olsztyn – 89,9 MHz
21. Radio ESKA Opole – 90,8 MHz
22. Radio ESKA Ostrów-Kalisz:
  - Kalisz – 101,1 MHz
  - Ostrów Wielkopolski – 89,3 MHz
23. Radio ESKA Ostrzeszów – 96,9 MHz
24. Radio ESKA Piła – 105,6 MHz
25. Radio ESKA Płock – 95,2 MHz
26. Radio ESKA Poznań – 93 MHz
27. Radio ESKA Południe:
  - Bielsko-Biała – 97,6 MHz
  - Cieszyn – 90,5 MHz
  - Gliwice – 93,4 MHz
  - Oświęcim – 94,9 MHz
  - Ustroń - 107,1 MHz
28. Radio ESKA Przemyśl – 90,3 MHz
29. Radio ESKA Radom – 106,9 MHz
30. Radio ESKA Rzeszów:
  - Krosno – 104,9 MHz
  - Rzeszów – 99,4 MHz
  - Sanok – 89,5 MHz
  - Ustrzyki Dolne – 106,5 MHz
31. Radio ESKA Siedlce – 96,8 MHz
32. Radio ESKA Starachowice – 102,1 MHz
33. Radio ESKA Suwałki — 89,4 MHz
34. Radio ESKA Szczecin
  - Szczecin - 96,9 MHz
  - Świnoujście - 89,2 MHz
35. Radio ESKA Szczecinek:
  - Szczecinek – 99 MHz
  - Łobez – 106,5 MHz
36. Radio ESKA Śląsk – 99,1 MHz (broadcasting from Katowice)
37. Radio ESKA Tarnów – 98,1 MHz
38. Radio ESKA Trójmiasto:
  - Gdańsk – 94,6 MHz
  - Gdynia – 90,7 MHz
39. Radio ESKA Toruń – 104,6 MHz
40. Radio ESKA Warszawa – 105,6 MHz
41. Radio ESKA Wrocław:
  - Jelenia Góra – 90,2 MHz
  - Wrocław – 97,4 MHz; 104,9 MHz
42. Radio ESKA Zamość – 97,3 MHz
43. Radio ESKA Zielona Góra – 105,7 MHz
44. Radio ESKA Żary - 106,6 MHz

== Listenership ==
According to a Radio Track study (carried out by Millward Brown SMG/KRC), Radio Eska's share in terms of listening, in the period from October to December 2025, was 6.7 per cent, which gave the station third place in terms of listenership in Poland.
