= Bereźnica Wyżna =

- Village
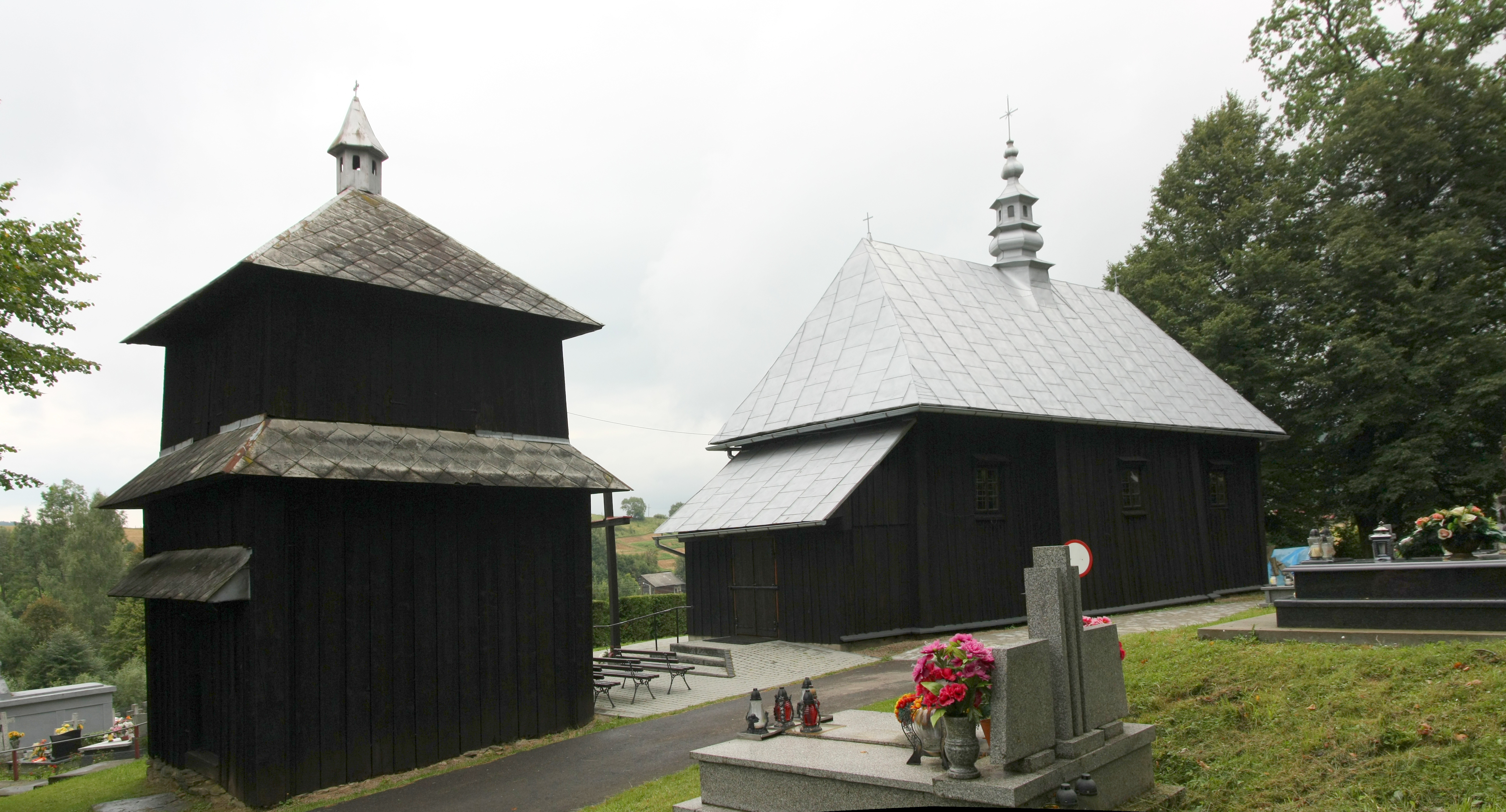
- Roman Catholic Church of the Nativity of the Virgin Mary, formerly a Greek Catholic church

- Location within Poland
- Coordinates: 49°21′11″N 22°21′40″E
- Country: Poland
- Voivodeship: Subcarpathian
- County: Lesko
- Gmina: Solina

Population
  - Total: 230

Bereźnica Wyżna [bɛrɛʑˈɲit͡sa ˈvɨʐna] is a village in the administrative district of Gmina Solina, within Lesko County, Subcarpathian Voivodeship, in south-eastern Poland.
