= Smrek =

Smrek is a Slovak language surname. Notable people with the surname include:

- Anna Smrek (born 2003), Canadian volleyball player, daughter of Mike
- Mike Smrek (born 1962), Canadian basketball player who played in the National Basketball Association
- Peter Smrek (born 1979), Slovak ice hockey player
- Stanislav Smrek (born 1986), Slovak footballer

== See also ==
- Smerek (surname)
