= Strzebowiska =

- Village
- Location within Poland
- Coordinates: 49°10′53″N 22°23′54″E
- Country: Poland
- Voivodeship: Podkarpackie
- County: Lesko
- Gmina: Cisna
- Population: 50

Strzebowiska [stʂɛbɔˈvʲiska] is a village in the administrative district of Gmina Cisna, within Lesko County, Podkarpackie Voivodeship, in south-eastern Poland, close to the border with Slovakia.
