= Solinka, Podkarpackie Voivodeship =

Solinka
- Village
- Location within Poland
- Coordinates: 49°10′14″N 22°14′25″E
- Country: Poland
- Voivodeship: Subcarpathian
- County: Lesko
- Gmina: Cisna
- Population: 10

Solinka [sɔˈlʲiŋka] is a village in the administrative district of Gmina Cisna, within Lesko County, Subcarpathian Voivodeship, in south-eastern Poland, close to the border with Slovakia.
