= Gmina Solina =

Gmina Solina Solina Commune
- Gmina
- Coat of arms
- Interactive map of Gmina Solina
- Coordinates (Solina): 49°23′N 22°28′E
- Country: Poland
- Voivodeship: Subcarpathian
- County: Lesko
- Seat: Polańczyk

Area
  - Total: 184.25 km^{2} (71.14 sq mi)

Population (2006)
  - Total: 5,106
  - Density: 27.71/km^{2} (71.77/sq mi)
- Website: http://www.esolina.pl

Gmina Solina is a rural gmina (administrative district) in Lesko County, Subcarpathian Voivodeship, in south-eastern Poland. It takes its name from its former seat, the village of Solina, which lies approximately 15 kilometres (9 mi) south-east of Lesko and 80 km (50 mi) south-east of the regional capital Rzeszów. The present seat is Polańczyk.

The gmina covers an area of 184.25 square kilometres (71.1 sq mi), and as of 2006 its total population is 5,106.

The gmina contains parts of the protected areas called Cisna-Wetlina Landscape Park and San Valley Landscape Park.

== Villages ==
Gmina Solina contains the villages and settlements of Berezka, Bereźnica Wyżna, Bóbrka, Bukowiec, Górzanka, Jawor, Myczków, Myczkowce, Polańczyk, Rajskie, Rybne, Solina, Terka, Werlas, Wola Matiaszowa, Wołkowyja and Zawóz.

== Neighbouring gminas ==
Gmina Solina is bordered by the gminas of Baligród, Cisna, Czarna, Lesko, Olszanica and Ustrzyki Dolne.
