= Cisna-Wetlina Landscape Park =

Protected area in Poland

Coordinates: 49°14′19″N 22°16′14″E

- Ciśniańsko-Wetliński Park Krajobrazowy
- IUCN category V (protected landscape/seascape)
- Location: Subcarpathian Voivodeship
- Area: 510.14 km^{2} (196.97 sq mi)
- Established: 1992

Cisna-Wetlina Landscape Park (Ciśniańsko-Wetliński Park Krajobrazowy) is a protected area (Landscape Park) in south-eastern Poland, established in 1992, covering an area of 510.14 square kilometres (196.97 sq mi).

The Park lies within Subcarpathian Voivodeship: in Lesko County (Gmina Baligród, Gmina Cisna, Gmina Solina) and Sanok County (Gmina Komańcza, Gmina Zagórz). Cisna-Wetlina Landscape Park is the buffer zone of the Bieszczady National Park on the west side.

Within the Landscape Park are seven nature reserves.

The highest peaks in the park reach almost 1,200 m above sea level and they are characterized by a multi-storey arrangement of mountain vegetation. There are two yew reserves in it. There are, among others bears, wolves, lynxes and wildcats.
