= Kalnica, Lesko County =

Lemko village in Poland

Kalnica Кальниця
- Village
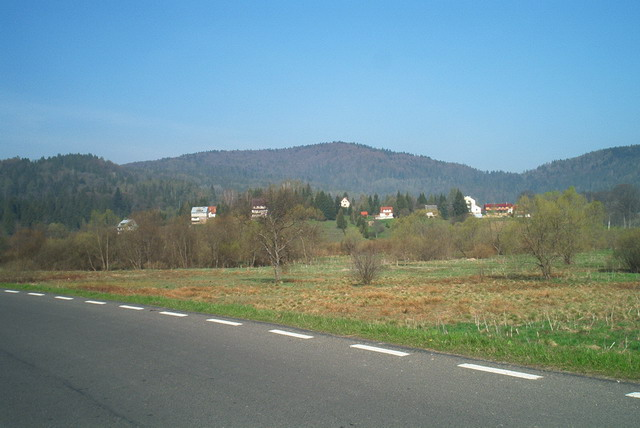
- Nickname: Górnej (Upper, as opposed to Lower Kalnica)
- Location within Poland
- Coordinates: 49°11′14″N 22°25′35″E
- Country: Poland
- Voivodeship: Subcarpathian
- County: Lesko
- Gmina: Cisna
- Population: 142
- Time zone: UTC+1, Summertime UTC+2

Kalnica [kalˈɲit͡sa] is an ancient Lesko village in Poland, in the commune of Tisna, Lise County, Subcarpathian Voivodeship. The population is 141individual (2011).

== Location ==
Kalnica is a village in the administrative district of Gmina Cisna, within Lesko County, Subcarpathian Voivodeship, in south-eastern Poland, close to the border with Slovakia.

== History ==
The exact date of Kalnica's foundation is unknown. The settlement probably existed during the time of Kyivan Rus.

Already in 1539, the village was in the possession of Mykola Gerburt.

From 1772 to 1918, it was part of Austria-Hungary.

In 1881, Kalnica had 415 inhabitants, of whom 413 were Greek Catholics and 2 Roman Catholics.

In 1904, a narrow-gauge railway to Novy Lupkov began operating.

From November 1918 to January 1919, the village was part of the Komanchan Republic. Between 1919-1939, the village was part of the Lesky District of the Lviv Voivodeship.

In 1921, the population of the village was 217 people (in 36 residential buildings): 196 Greek Catholics, 15 Jews, 6 Roman Catholics.

In 1939, the village had 720 inhabitants, of whom 690 were Ukrainians, 10 Poles (border guard) and 20 Jews.

From 1772 to 1918, Kalnica was part of Austria-Hungary.

In 1881, the village had 415 inhabitants, of whom 413 were Greek Catholics and 2 Roman Catholics. Strzebowiska belonged to the rural commune of Kalnica.

In 1904, a narrow-gauge railway to Novy Lupkov began operating.

From November 1918 to January 1919, the village was part of the Komanchan Republic. From 1919-1939, the village was part of the Lesky District of the Lviv Voivodeship.

In 1921, the population of the village was 217 people (in 36 residential buildings): 196 Greek Catholics, 15 Jews, 6 Roman Catholics.

In 1939, the village had 720 inhabitants, of whom 690 were Ukrainians, 10 Poles (border guard) and 20 Jews.

Following the UIA struggle against Soviet and Polish troops, which continued in this area from 1945-1947, the Ukrainian population was forcibly displaced, an action that some historians have characterized as ethnocide. Most inhabitants were resettled to USSR in 1946; those who avoided this were deported to the post-German territory of northern Poland in 1947 during the Vistula Operation.

In 1975-1998, the village belonged to the Krosno Voivodeship.

== Famous People ==
Ivan Biretsky(1815—1883) — Ukrainian public figure, the first collector of Lemki folklore.

Roman Sekela(1876-1938) — Ukrainian lawyer, senior officer of the UGA, public figure, writer, son-in-law of Ulyana Kravchenko.

== Demography ==
Demographic structure as at 31 March 2011:

| | Total | Pre-working age | Workable age | Post working age |
|---|---|---|---|---|
| Men | 73 | 10 | 57 | 6 |
| Women | 68 | 11 | 46 | 11 |
| Total | 141 | 21 | 103 | 17 |
