= Niklewicz =

Niklewicz, archaic feminine forms: Niklewiczowa (married) Niklewiczówna (unmarried) is a Polish surname of East Slavic origin. Notable people with the surname include:

- Adam Niklewicz (born 1957), Polish-born American sculptor
- Konrad Niklewicz (born 1975), Polish journalist and government official
- Mieczysław Niklewicz (1880–1948), Polish journalist, publisher, and public figure
