= Gmina Cisna =

Gmina Cisna Cisna Commune
- Gmina
- Coat of arms
- Interactive map of Gmina Cisna
- Coordinates (Cisna): 49°12′41″N 22°19′44″E
- Country: Poland
- Voivodeship: Subcarpathian
- County: Lesko
- Seat: Cisna

Area
  - Total: 286.89 km^{2} (110.77 sq mi)

Population (2006)
  - Total: 1,669
  - Density: 5.818/km^{2} (15.07/sq mi)
- Website: http://www.gmina.cisna.pl/

Gmina Cisna is a rural gmina (administrative district) in Lesko County, Subcarpathian Voivodeship, in south-eastern Poland, on the Slovak border. Its seat is the village of Cisna, which lies approximately 30 kilometres (19 mi) south of Lesko and 95 km (59 mi) south of the regional capital Rzeszów.

The gmina covers an area of 286.89 square kilometres (110.8 sq mi), and as of 2006 its total population is 1,669.

The gmina contains part of the protected area called Cisna-Wetlina Landscape Park.

== Villages ==
Gmina Cisna contains the villages and settlements of Buk, Cisna, Dołżyca, Habkowce, Kalnica, Krzywe, Liszna, Łuh, Majdan, Moczarne, Przysłup, Roztoki Górne, Smerek, Solinka, Strzebowiska, Wetlina, Zawój and Żubracze.

== Neighbouring gminas ==
Gmina Cisna is bordered by the gminas of Baligród, Czarna, Komańcza, Lutowiska and Solina. It also borders Slovakia.
