= Smerek (surname) =

Smerek is a surname. Notable people with the surname include:

- Don Smerek (born 1957), American football player
- Mike Smrek (born 1962), Canadian professional basketball player

== See also ==
- Smrek
