= Kalnica, Sanok County =

Lemko village in Poland

Kalnica Кальниця
- Village
- Nickname: Niżna (Lower, as opposed to Upper Kalnica)
- Location within Poland
- Coordinates: 49°21′30″N 22°12′10″E
- Country: Poland
- Voivodeship: Subcarpathian
- County: Sanok
- Gmina: Zagórz
- Population: 95

Kalnica [kalˈɲit͡sa] is a village in the administrative district of Gmina Zagórz, within Sanok County, Subcarpathian Voivodeship, in south-eastern Poland.
