= Cisna =

- Village
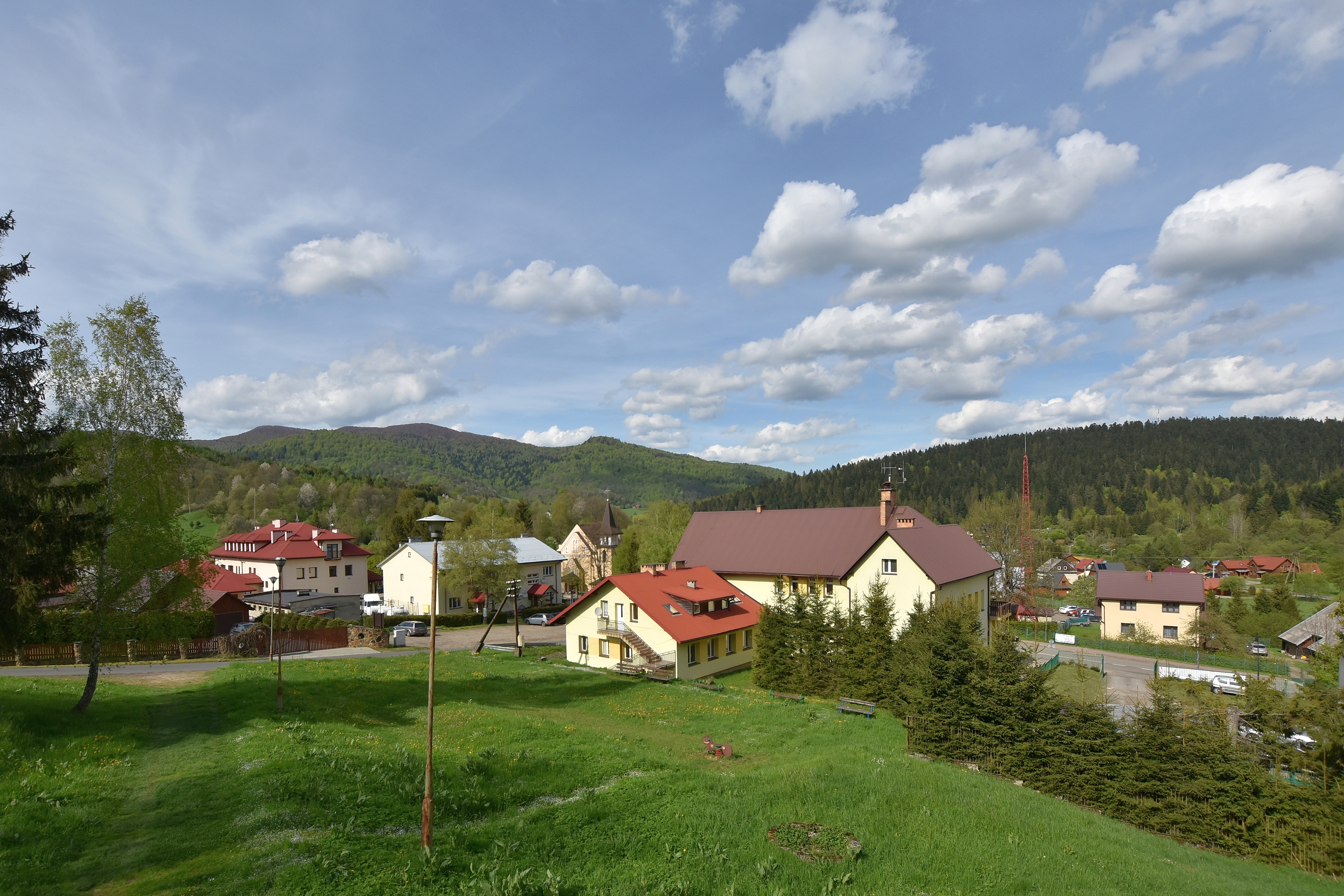
- View of the village and surrounding mountains

- Coat of arms
- Etymology: Its name comes from the west slavic dialect word cis, meaning "taxus" (taxus village)
- Location within Poland
- Coordinates: 49°12′41″N 22°19′44″E
- Country: Poland
- Voivodeship: Subcarpathian
- County: Lesko
- Gmina: Cisna
- First mentioned: 1552

Area
  - Total: 8.8 km^{2} (3.4 sq mi)
- Elevation: 482 m (1,581 ft)

Population (31 December 2002)
  - Total: 460
  - Density: 52/km^{2} (140/sq mi)
- Time zone: UTC+1 (CET)
  - Summer (DST): UTC+2 (CEST)
- Postal code: 38-607
- Area code: 13
- Car plate: RLS
- Website: http://www.cisna.pl

Cisna [ˈt͡ɕisna] is a village located in the administrative district of Gmina Cisna in Lesko County, in the Podkarpackie Voivodeship of south-eastern Poland.

== History ==
The village was founded in 1552 by the Bals family.

Jacek Fredro founded a blacksmith company in Cisna that provided the area with agricultural instruments, pots and stoves. His son Aleksander Fredro, a famous Polish poet, playwright and writer, was born there.

Between 1890 and 1895, a narrow gauge railroad was built to Nowy Łupków and in 1904 extended to Kalnica. In the interbellum, Cisna was one of the principal villages in the Bieszczady and was a well-known place to spend a holiday, growing to 60,000 inhabitants.

The Second World War destroyed almost all of the village. Afterwards, between 1945 and 1947, fighting continued in the area between Polish and Soviet armies and the Ukrainian Insurgent Army. The village was burned in 1946 and all villagers were forcibly deported to the USSR. Some people were deported from Cisna on 29 April 1947 (Operation Vistula) to the Gdańsk area of Poland.

== Hiking trails ==
- European walking route E8
  - Prešov - Miháľov - Kurimka - Dukla - Iwonicz-Zdrój – Rymanów-Zdrój - Puławy – Tokarnia (778 m or 2,552 ft) – Kamień (717 m or 2,352 ft) – Komańcza - Cisna - Ustrzyki Górne - Tarnica - Wołosate.

== See also ==
- Komancza Republic (November 1918 – January 1919)
