= Nowy Łupków =

- Village
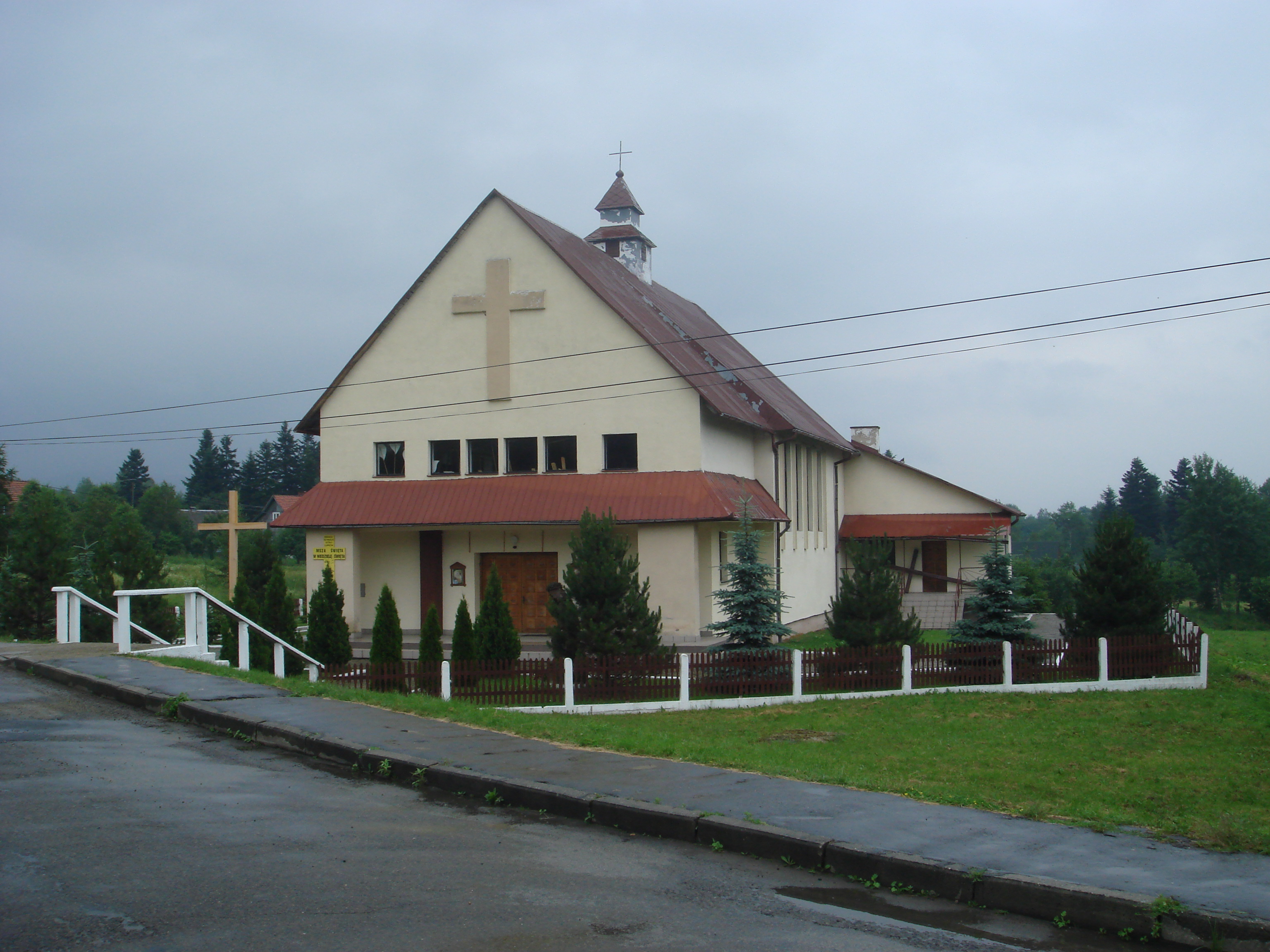
- Village church
- Interactive map of Nowy Łupków
- Location within Poland
- Coordinates: 49°15′24″N 22°5′2″E
- Country: Poland
- Voivodeship: Subcarpathian
- County: Sanok
- Gmina: Komańcza
- Population: 390

Nowy Łupków [ˈnɔvɨ ˈwupkuf] is a village in the administrative district of Gmina Komańcza, within Sanok County, Subcarpathian Voivodeship, in south-eastern Poland, close to the border with Slovakia.

The village emerged when the local railway station was built in 1872, along the line from Zagórz to then-Hungarian-owned Slovakia (First Hungarian-Galician Railway, Erste Ungarisch-Galizische Eisenbahn). At first, its inhabitants were mostly working on the railways. Currently, it is the southernmost railroad station in Poland, and a rail border crossing with Slovakia. In 1890-1898 the village was also linked with narrow-gauge Bieszczadzka Forest Railway.

A penal colony was built here after the Second World War, in which a number of Solidarność representatives were imprisoned during the Martial law in Poland period in 1981 and 1982.
