= Wetlina =

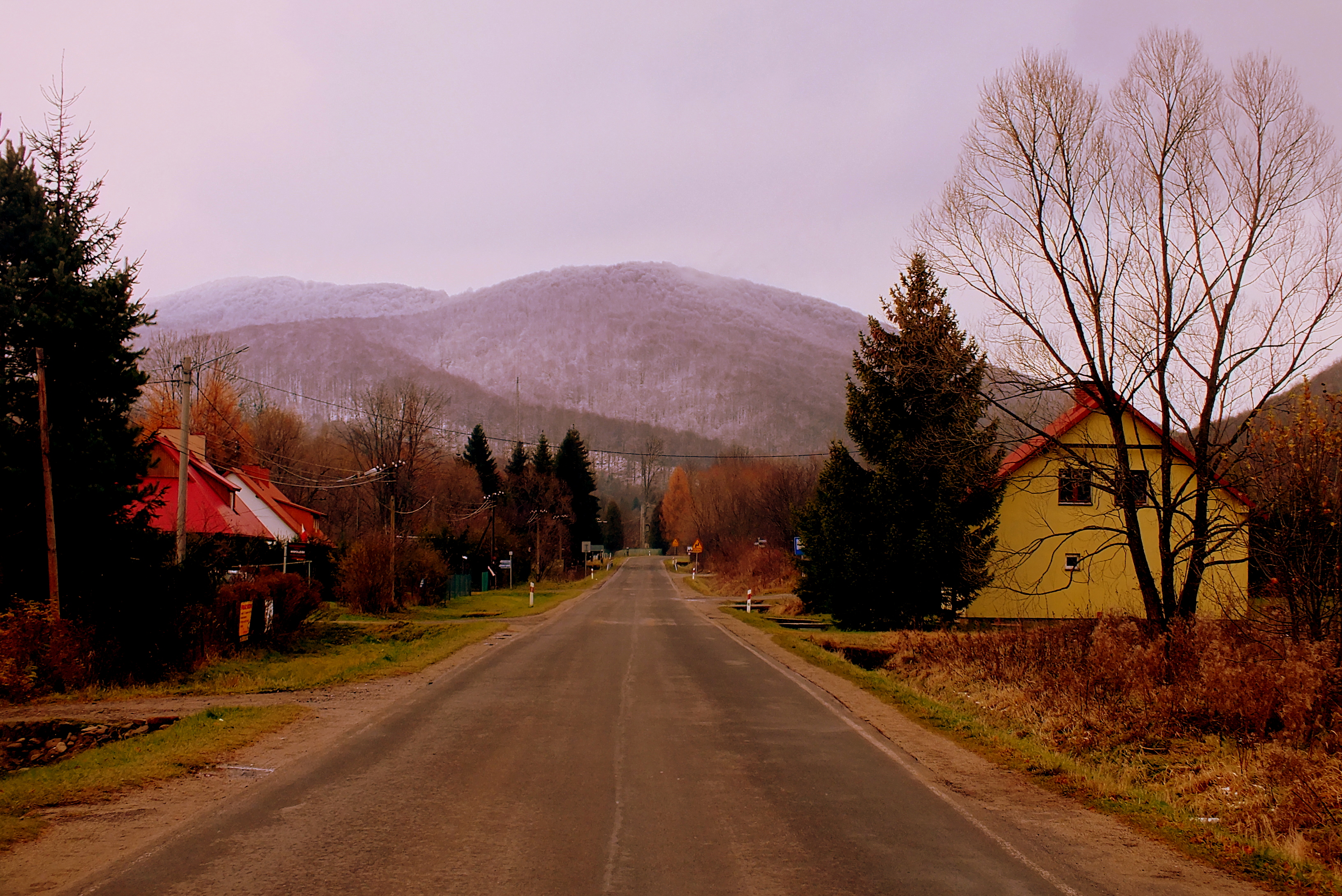

- Location within Poland
- Coordinates: 49°09′27″N 22°28′01″E
- Country: Poland
- Voivodeship: Subcarpathian
- Powiat: Lesko
- Gmina: Cisna

Population (2004)
  - Total: 307
- Time zone: UTC+1 (CET)
  - Summer (DST): UTC+2 (CEST)
- Postal Code: 38-608
- Area code: (+48) 13
- Car Plates: RLS

Wetlina [vɛtˈlʲina] is a village with a population of 307 (in 2004) located in south-eastern Poland in the Subcarpathian Voivodeship, near the border with Slovakia. It is near the entrance to Bieszczady National Park and is situated along the Wetlinka river.

== History ==
Vetlyna was first mentioned as a populated village in the year 1580, organized under Wallachian Law. In 1880 there were 115 homes listed in the local census. The majority of the population ascribed to the Greek Catholic faith.

Boykos montagnards were the primary inhabitants of the area until 1945. Following battles between the Ukrainian Insurgent Army and the People's Army of Poland, the area was completely depopulated. It was resettled during the 1950s and 1960s with forestry workers and Franciscan Friars.

On June 7, 1946, the Polish Army entered the village under operation named "Vistula." "Operation Vistula" was set forth to purge partisans from the region. The partisans had been living in the forests and mountains, and continued to harass and agitate the Poland authorities in their fight for political autonomy. It was believed that the villagers were supporting the partisans with food and supplies. The Poland Army gave the residents one hour to pack up their belongings, loaded them on trucks and deported ("resettled") the residents to distant villages in northern Poland and Ukraine. The Army set fire to all the citizens remaining possessions, including houses, barns and haystacks. They wanted nothing to remain for the partisans. Several citizens died in the deportation and only two or three families from the village were allowed to resettle in the same place. No one was allowed to resettle in the area until 1958, at which time, the Poland government allowed only ethnic Polish to settle in the region.

The foundations of the largest Cerkiew (Eastern Rite Church), Church of Christ the King (Greek Catholic) in the area is found in the village. The church was destroyed by fire in 1946 and the foundation dynamited by the Polish Army in 1950. Adjacent to the ruins, the Divine Mercy Roman Catholic Church was built in the early 1980s.

=== Population ===
The population of the area and the village for the years 1881-2004 is listed below.

Year	Population
1735	639
1881	819
1921	805
1938	1037
1947	0
1991	296
2004	307

== Geography and location ==
The village is located near the source (springs) of the Weltinka river, a primary tributary of the Solinka river. South and west of the village are the Sękowa (1022 m) and Paprotna (1193 m) mountain peaks. East of the village are the range peaks of Połonina Wetlińska, with a maximum elevation of 1253 m.

== Tourism ==
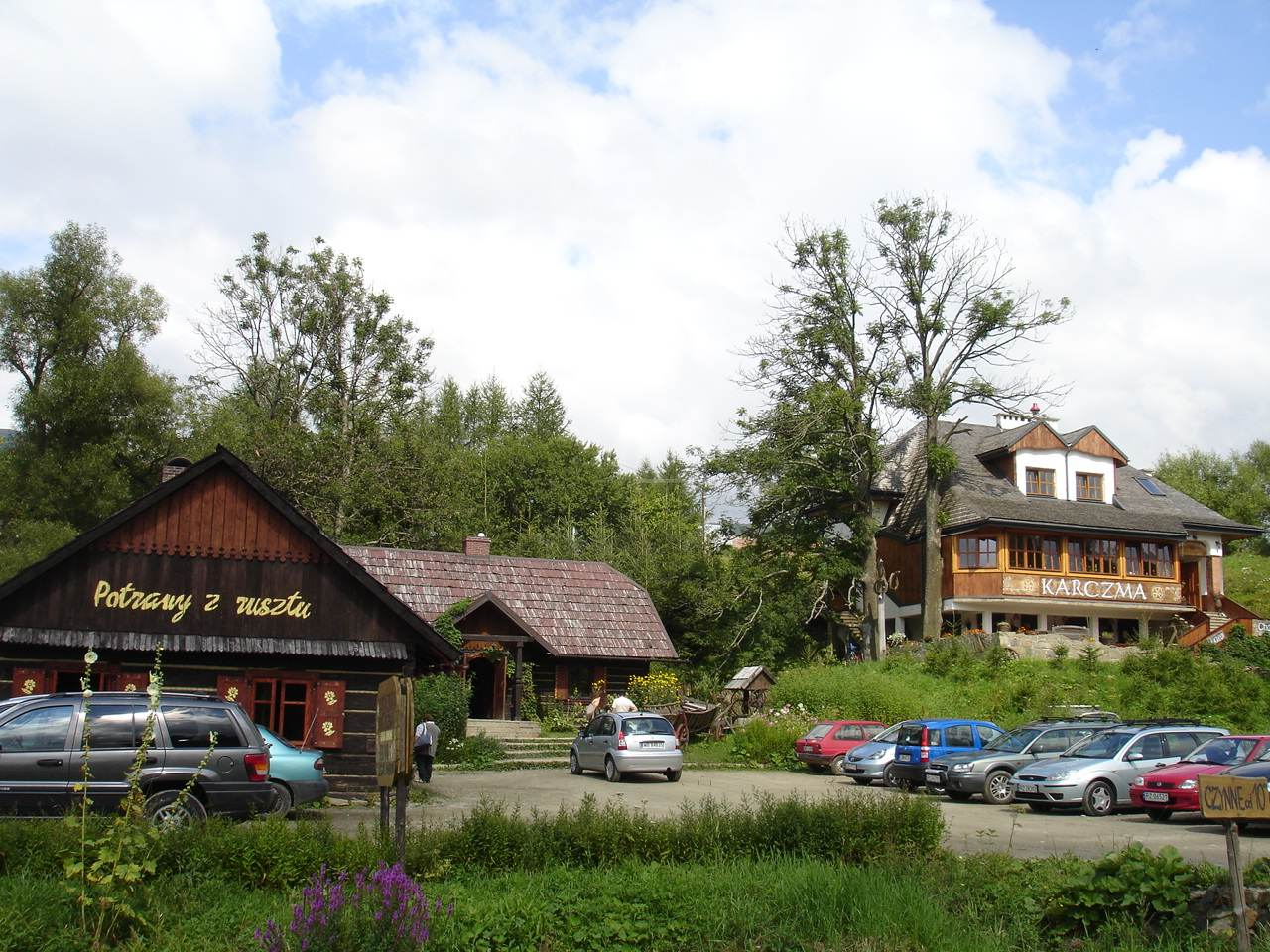
Restaurants and Pubs

Wetlina is shares in the tourism of the Bieszczady Mountain area. Trips to L'viv, festivals, and hiking are popular activities.
