= Lesko County =

Lesko County Powiat leski
- County
- Flag Coat of arms

- Location within the voivodeship
- Coordinates (Lesko): 49°28′28″N 22°19′44″E
- Country: Poland
- Voivodeship: Subcarpathian
- Seat: Lesko
- Gminas: Total 5: Gmina Baligród; Gmina Cisna; Gmina Lesko; Gmina Olszanica; Gmina Solina

Area
  - Total: 834.86 km^{2} (322.34 sq mi)

Population (2019)
  - Total: 26,532
  - Density: 31.780/km^{2} (82.310/sq mi)
  - Urban: 5,424
  - Rural: 21,108
- Car plates: RLS
- Website: www.powiat-leski.pl

Lesko County (Polish: powiat leski) is a unit of territorial administration and local government (powiat) in Subcarpathian Voivodeship, south-eastern Poland, on the Slovak border. It was created in 2002 out of five gminas which previously made up the western part of Bieszczady County. Its administrative seat and only town is Lesko, which lies 67 kilometres (42 mi) south of the regional capital Rzeszów.

The county covers an area of 834.86 square kilometres (322.3 sq mi). As of 2019 its total population is 26,532, out of which the population of Lesko is 5,424, and the rural population is 21,108.

== Neighbouring counties ==
Lesko County is bordered by Sanok County to the west, Przemyśl County to the north and Bieszczady County to the east. It also borders Slovakia to the south.

== Administrative divisions ==
The county is subdivided into five gminas (one urban-rural and four rural). These are listed in the following table, in descending order of population.

Gmina	Type	Area (km^{2})	Population (2019)	Seat
Gmina Lesko	urban-rural	111.6	11,333	Lesko
Gmina Solina	rural	184.3	5,359	Solina
Gmina Olszanica	rural	94.0	4,889	Olszanica
Gmina Baligród	rural	158.1	3,176	Baligród
Gmina Cisna	rural	286.9	1,775	Cisna

== Gallery ==
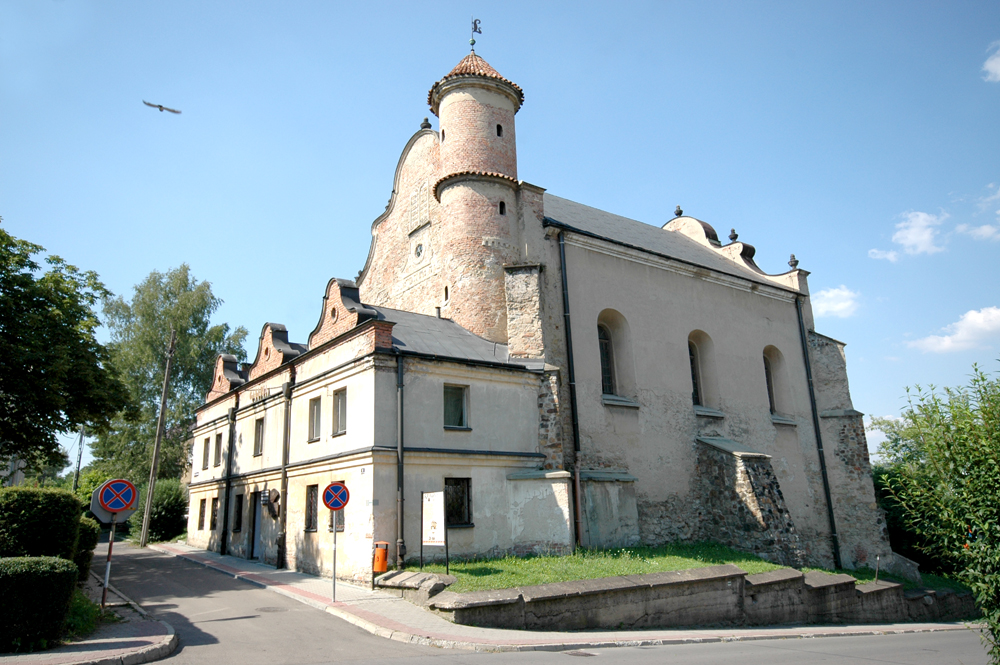

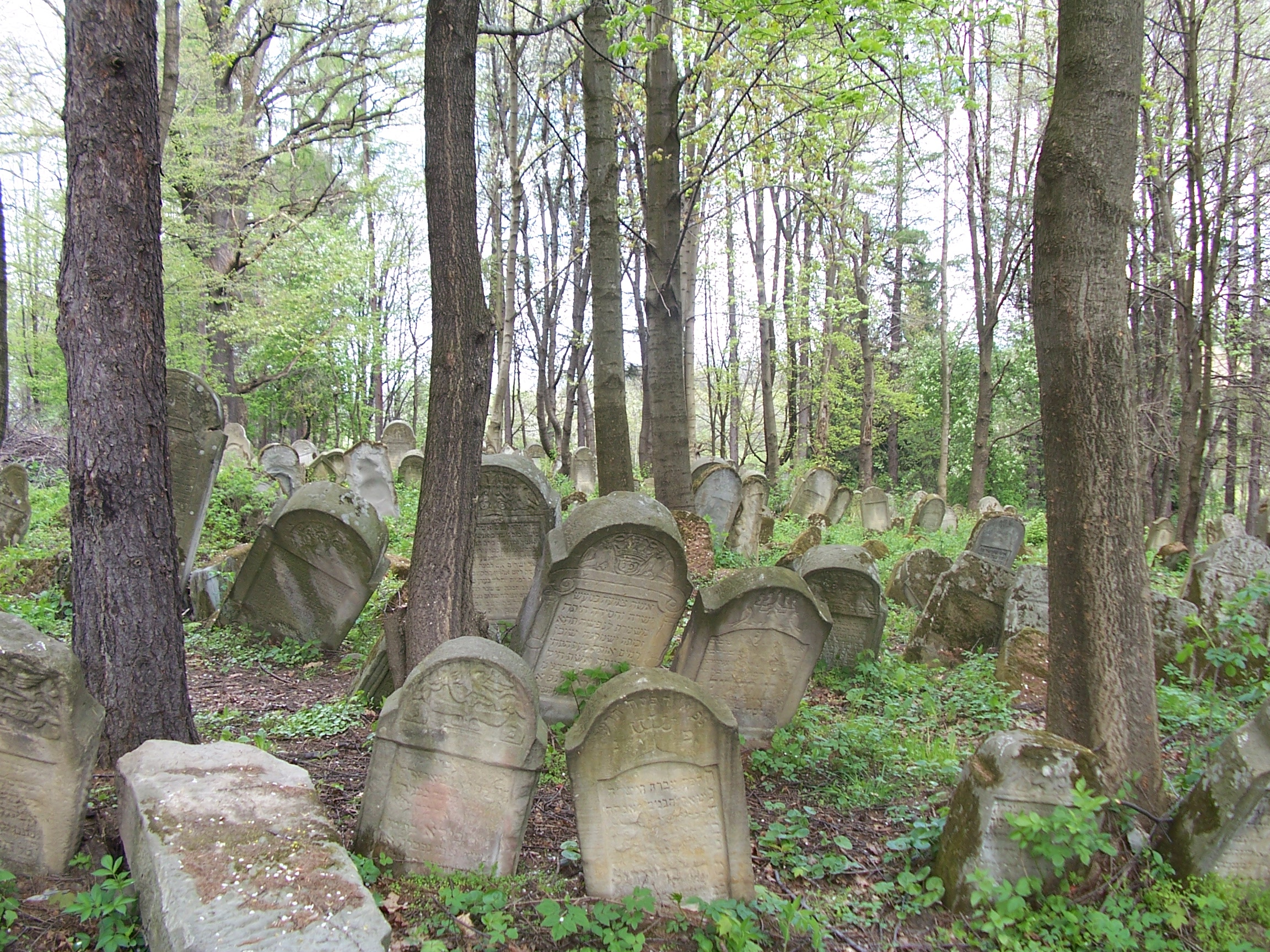

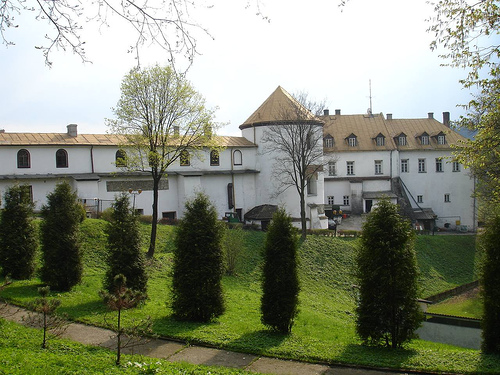

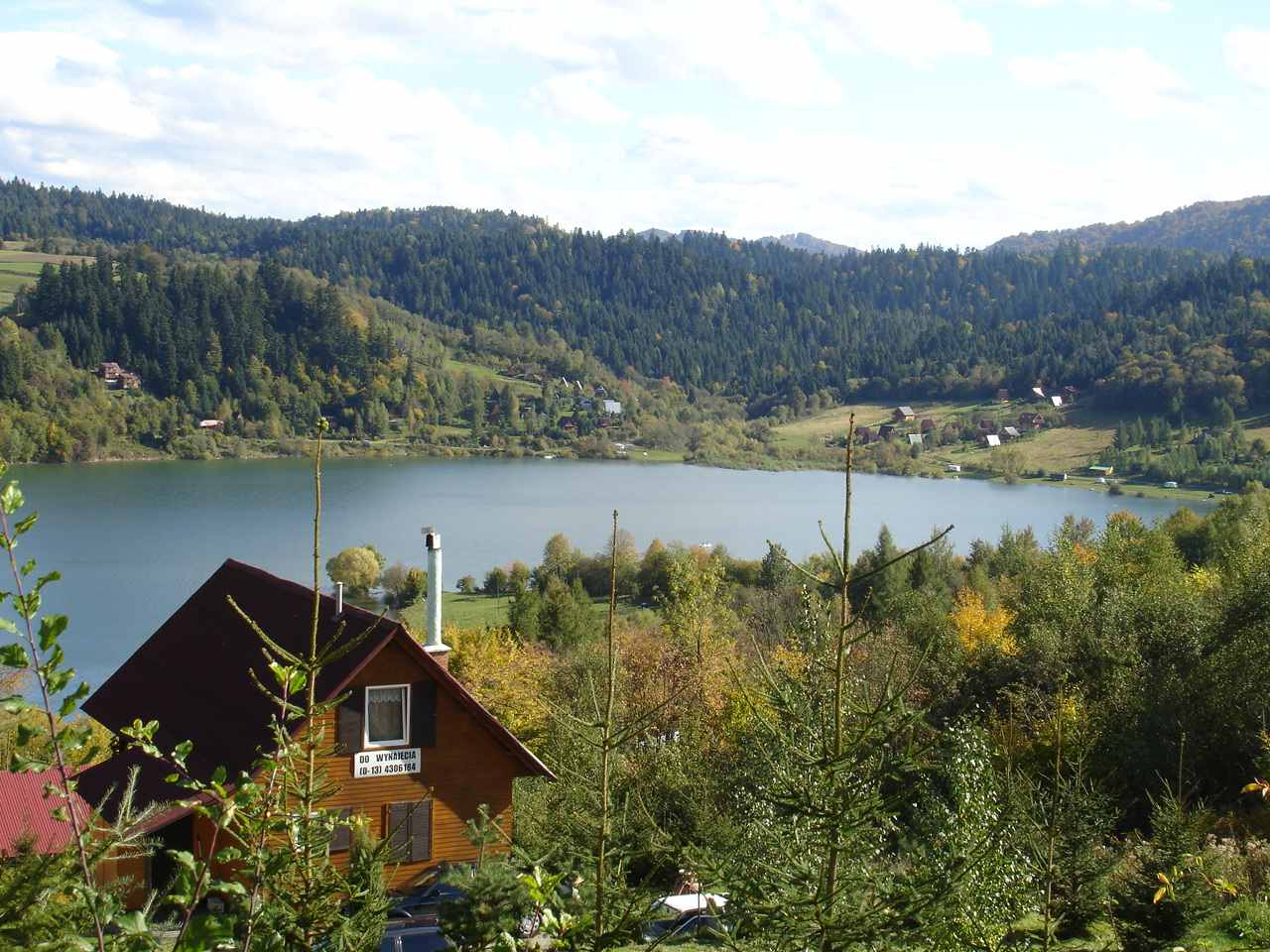

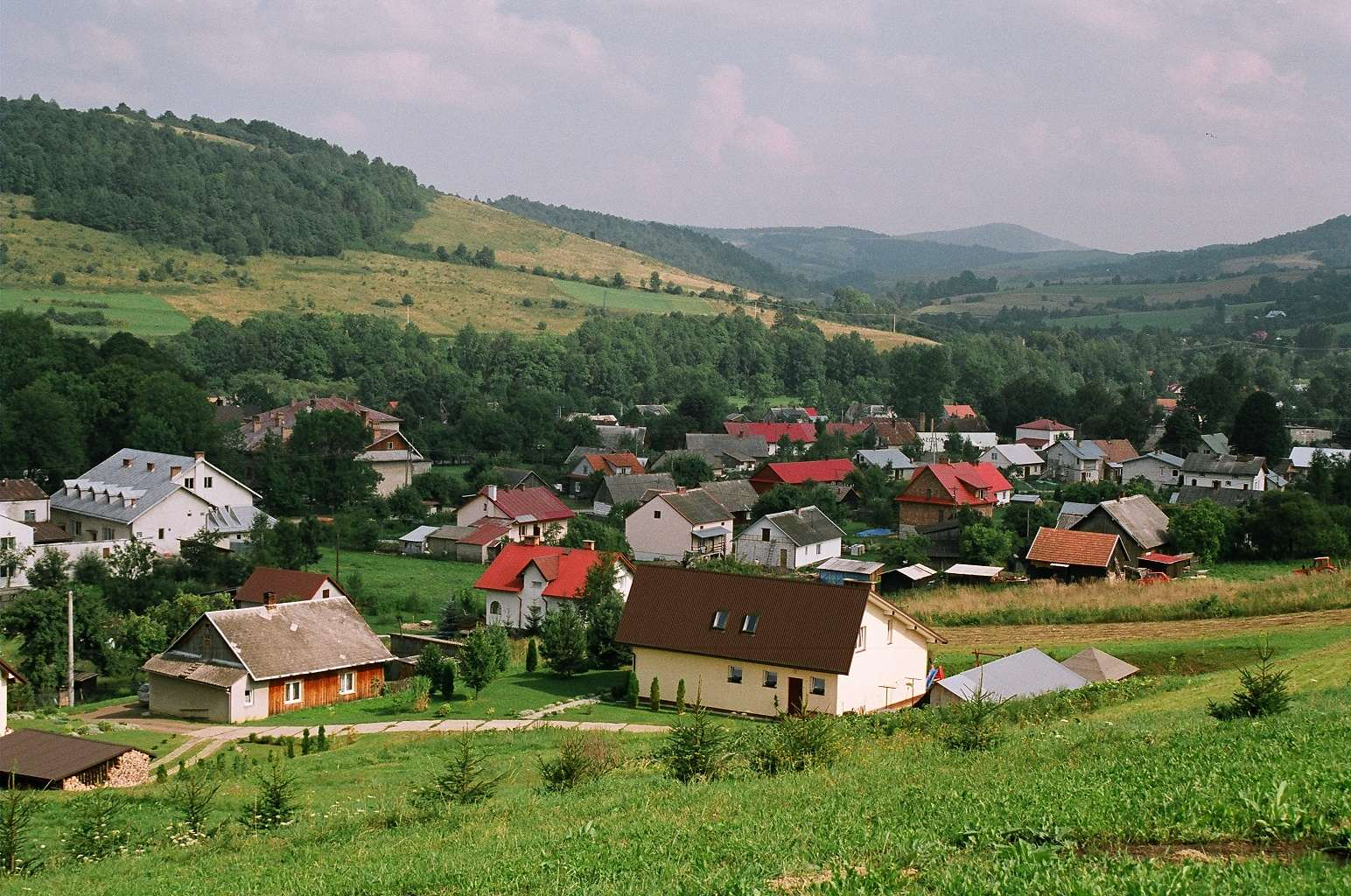

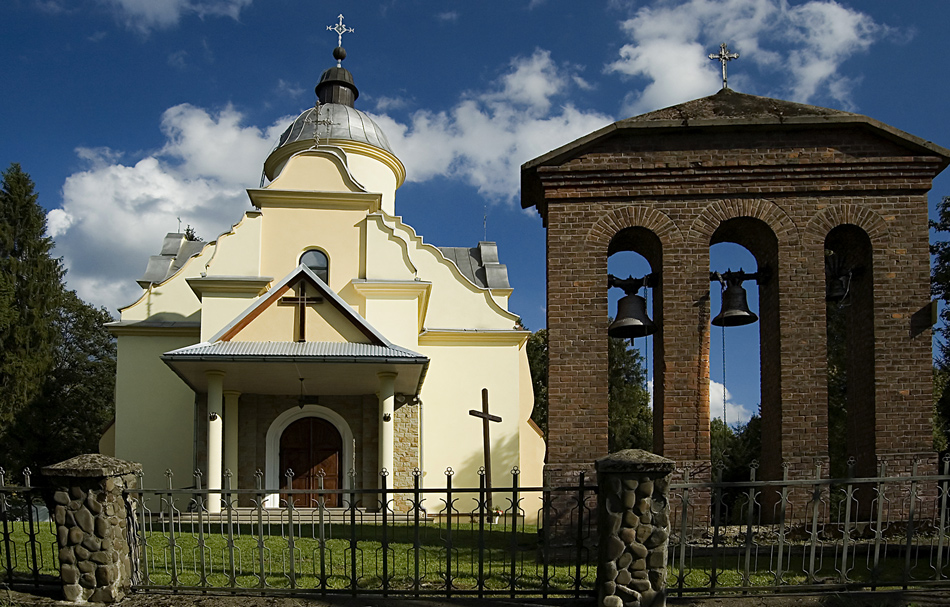

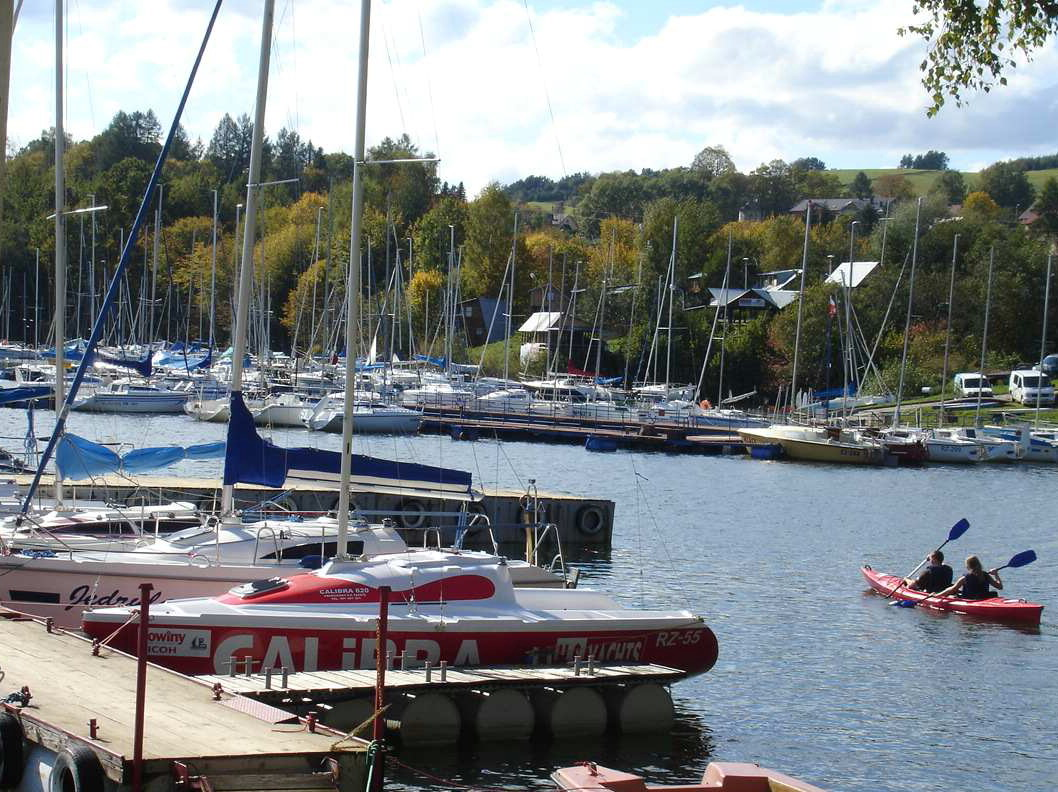

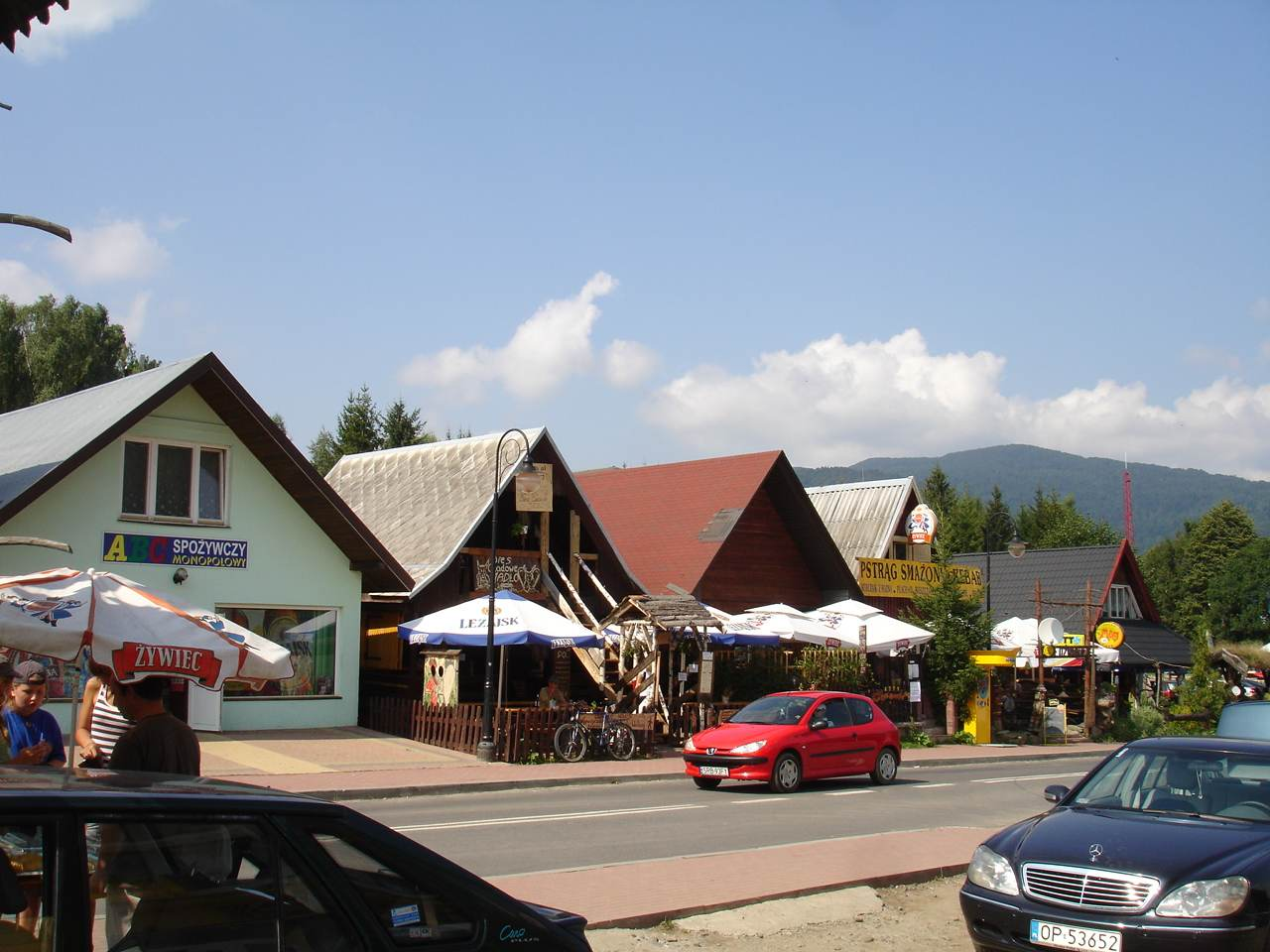

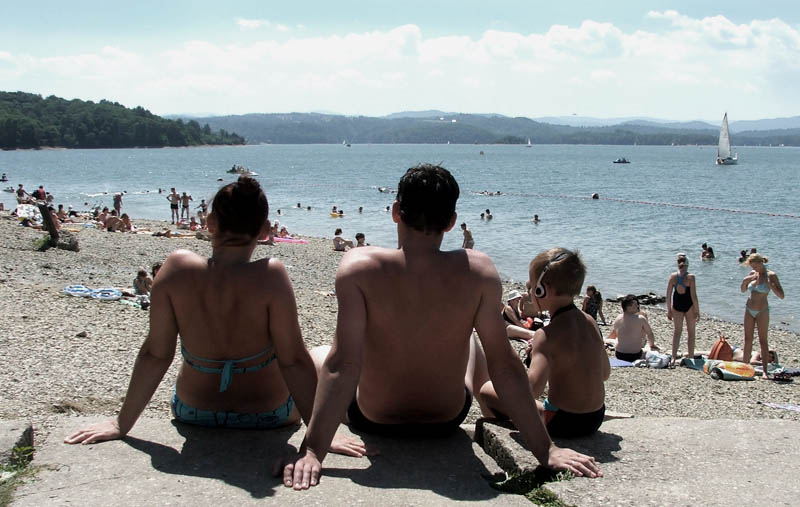
