= Petroleum Trail =

International tourist trail

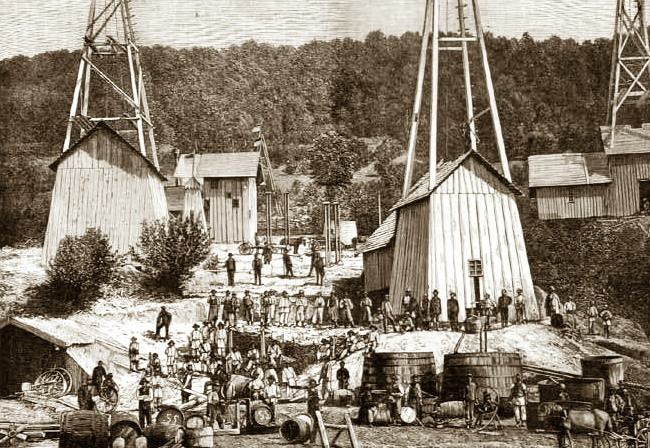
View of the oil field in Galicia. Oil wells (pl. szyby naftowe), erected in 1881

The Petroleum Trail is an international tourist trail which runs from Poland to Ukraine linking places associated with the petroleum industry of the 19th century.

== Background ==
During the mid 19th and early 20th centuries, significant oil reserves were discovered and developed in Galicia near Drohobych and Boryslav, The first European attempt to drill for oil was in Bóbrka, Krosno County, Western Galicia, in 1854. By 1867, a well at Kleczany was drilled to about 200 meters using steam. On December 31, 1872, a railway line linking Borysław (now Boryslav) with the nearby city of Drohobycz (now Drohobych) was opened. Briton John Simon Bergheim and Canadian William Henry McGarvey came to Galicia in 1882. (Note: William McGarvey helped develop a rig in the 1860s or 1870s which made his Canadian drilling technology and Canadian drillers famous around the world. John Simon Bergheim and William Henry McGarvey had unsuccessfully searched for oil in Germany under the Continental Oil Company of which McGarvey was the director. They left Germany and began their first drilling in Galicia during 1882 under the company name of MacGarvey and Bergheim.) In 1883, their company, MacGarvey and Bergheim, bored holes of 700 to 1,000 meters and found large oil deposits. In 1885, they renamed their oil developing enterprise the Galician-Karpathian Petroleum Company (German: Galizisch-Karpathische Petroleum Aktien-Gesellschaft). The company was headquartered in Vienna, with McGarvey as the chief administrator and Bergheim as field engineer, (Note: Just after the turn of the century, Bergheim was killed in a taxicab accident in London, England, leaving McGarvey to carry on alone.) and built a large refinery at Maryampole near Gorlice, in the southeast corner of Galicia.

Considered the biggest, most efficient enterprise in Austria-Hungary, Maryampole was built in six months and employed 1,000 workers. (Note: Later, Bergheim and McGarvey bought a number of small oil-producing and refining operations and acquired the Apollo Oil Company of Budapest.) Subsequently, investors from Britain, Belgium, and Germany established companies to develop the oil and natural gas industries in Galicia. This influx of capital caused the number of petroleum enterprises to shrink from 900 to 484 by 1884, and to 3,700 workers provided by 285 companies by 1890. However, the number of oil refineries increased from thirty-one in 1880 to fifty-four in 1904. By 1904, there were thirty boreholes in Borysław of over 1,000 meters. Production increased by 50% between 1905 and 1906 and then tripled between 1906 and 1909 because of unexpected discoveries of large oil reserves. By 1909, production reached its peak at 2,076,000 tons or 4% of worldwide production. Often called the "Polish Baku", the oil fields of Borysław and nearby Tustanowice accounted for over 90% of the national oil output of the Austria-Hungary Empire. From 500 residents in the 1860s, Borysław had grown to 12,000 by 1898. At the turn of the century, Galicia was ranked fourth in the world as an oil producer. (Note: In 1909, first in the world for oil production was the United States with 183,171,000 barrels, the Russian Empire was second with 65,970,000 barrels, and the Austria-Hungary Empire was third with 14,933,000 barrels per year due to its significant oil reserves discoveries between 1905 and 1909.) This significant increase in oil production also caused a slump in oil prices. A very rapid decrease in oil production in Galicia occurred just before the Balkans conflicts.

Galicia was the Central Powers' only major domestic source of oil during the Great War.

== Sanok County ==
- Zarszyn – glycol and methanol storage for natural gas mining
- Strachocina – underground gas storage, structure of the old mine
- Sanok – exposition of the 19th-century oil industry related structures in Skansen – Open Air Museum
- Tyrawa Solna – preserved structure of a mine and pumping jack
- Wielopole – buildings of the office, boiler – room, waiting room for miners

== History ==
- 1866 – Set up of oil production centres: Witryłów-Hłomcza, Polana, Łodyna-Brzegi, Zagórz, Rajskie, Stara Wieś, Głębokie, Turze Pole, Wielopole, Mokre, Tokarnia, Grabownica.
- 1928 – Discovery of Strachocina natural gas reservoir.
- 1924 – 1939 – Galician Petroleum Society "Galicja" drills on area of Jurowce, Strachocina.
- 1930s – Oil and natural gas are produced among others in: Grabownica, Strachocina, Turze Pole, Stara Wies, Humniska, Wańkowa, Ropienka, Polana, Wielopole.
- September 1939 – "Beskiden Erdöl Gewinnungs – Geselschaft", renamed for "Karpaten Oil" infill drills of reservoirs: Wielopole, Mokre, Grabownica.
- October 9, 1944 – Creation of the State Petroleum Office, which form letter Nr15 establish "... the highest organising unit of mining district – Sector Sanok ..."
- 1946 – Beginning of rotary method in drilling.
- 1953 – Creation of drilling company – Sanok.

== Old postcards ==
View at the Oil Field, Galician Petroleum Society "Galicja",1900s

View at the Oil Field, Mokre, 1914 Poland

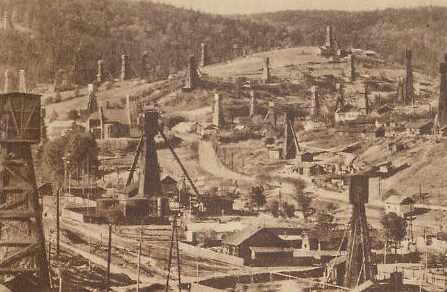
View at the Oil Field, Oil wells 1909

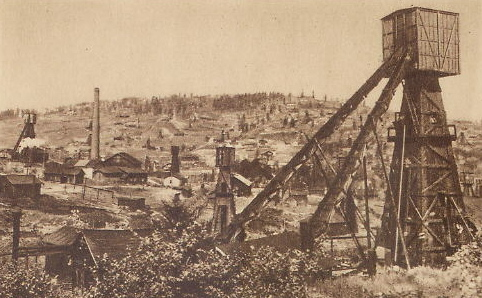
View at the Oil Field, Oil wells 1911

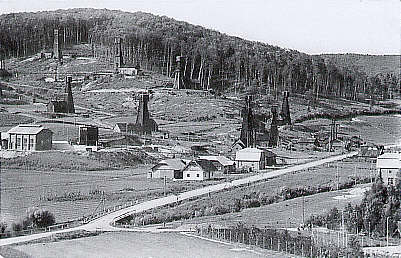
View at the Oil Field "Grabownica", 1930s

== See also ==
- Ignacy Łukasiewicz
