= Ignacy Łukasiewicz =

Polish pharmacist, engineer, businessman, inventor and philanthropist

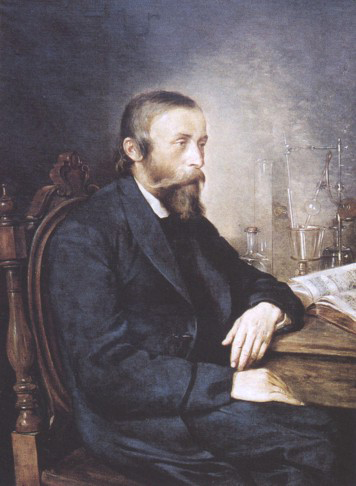
- Born: 8 March 1822; Zaduszniki, Austrian Empire
- Died: 7 January 1882 (aged 59); Chorkówka, Austria-Hungary
- Education: University of Vienna (MA)
- Occupations: Pharmacist, engineer, businessman, inventor, philanthropist

Jan Józef Ignacy Łukasiewicz (Polish pronunciation: [iɡˈnatsɨ wukaˈɕɛvitʂ]; 8 March 1822 – 7 January 1882) was a Polish pharmacist, engineer, businessman, inventor, and philanthropist. He was one of the most prominent philanthropists in the Kingdom of Galicia and Lodomeria, crown land of Austria-Hungary. He was a pioneer who in 1856 built the world's first modern oil refinery.

His achievements included the discovery of how to distill kerosene from seep crude oil, the invention of the modern kerosene lamp (1853), the introduction of the first modern street lamp in Europe (1853), and the construction of the world's first modern oil well (1854).

== Life ==
=== Youth and studies ===
Łada coat-of-arms

Ignacy Łukasiewicz was born on 8 March 1822 in Zaduszniki, near Mielec, Kingdom of Galicia and Lodomeria in the Austrian Empire (after the Partitions of Poland) as the youngest of five children. Very little is known about his father's and mother's families. His father came from a noble family, speculated to have possibly been of ultimate Armenian origin. However this connection may be a conflation with a separate, land-owning family of Armenian descent that happened to share the same surname, as Łukasiewicz's own paternal family belonged to the minor nobility and was never land-owning. His mother was connected with the Świętopełk princes.

His parents were Apolonia, née Świetlik, and Józef Łukasiewicz, a member of the local intelligentsia minor nobility entitled to use the Łada coat of arms and a veteran of Kościuszko's Uprising. The family rented a small manor in Zaduszniki, but soon after Ignacy's birth financial difficulties forced them to relocate to the nearby city of Rzeszów. There Ignacy entered the local secondary school (Konarski's Gymnasium), but failed to pass the examinations and left in 1836. In order to help his parents and financially support all the relatives, he moved to Łańcut, where he began work as a pharmacist's assistant. Toward the end of his life, Łukasiewicz often described his childhood as happy; the home atmosphere was patriotic and somewhat democratic, and he commonly recalled his first tutor, Colonel Woysym-Antoniewicz, who resided in their house.

=== Involvement in political movements ===
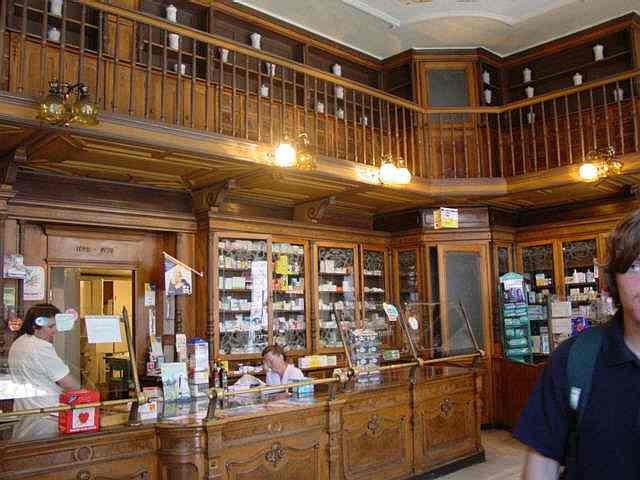
Mikolasch's Gold Star Pharmacy

Upon moving to Łańcut, Łukasiewicz also became involved in several political organizations that supported the idea of restoring Polish sovereignty and independence and participated in many political gatherings around the area. In 1840 he returned to Rzeszów, where he continued working at Edward Hübl's private pharmacy. In 1845 he met diplomat and activist Edward Dembowski, who admitted Łukasiewicz to the illegal "Centralization of the Polish Democratic Society", a party that focused on radical policies and supported a revolt against the Austrian government. The organization's aim was to prepare an all-national uprising against all three partitioning powers. Since the movement was seen as a possible danger to the Austrian monarchy, on 19 February 1846 Łukasiewicz and several other members of the party were arrested by the Austrian authorities and imprisoned in the city of Lwów. However, on 27 December 1847 Łukasiewicz was released from prison due to lack of evidence, but for the rest of his life he was regarded as "politically untrustworthy" and often observed by local police that was in possession of his records. He was also ordered to remain in Lwów with his elder brother Franciszek.

=== Career as chemist ===
On 15 August 1848 he was employed at one of the biggest and best pharmacies in Austrian Galicia (so-called "Austrian Poland"); the Golden Star (Pod Złotą Gwiazdą) Pharmacy in Lviv, modern-day Ukraine, owned by Piotr Mikolasch. In 1850, a handheld pharmaceutical almanac and a precious document entitled manuskrypt, the joint work of Mikolasch and Łukasiewicz was published. Because of this achievement, the authorities granted him a permit to continue pharmaceutical studies at the Royal Jagiellonian University in Kraków. After several years of studies, financed mostly by Mikolasch, he passed all his university examinations except for that in pharmacognosy, which prevented him from graduating. Finally on 30 July 1852 Łukasiewicz graduated from the pharmacy department at the University of Vienna, where he earned a master's degree in pharmaceutics. As soon as he returned to the pharmacy of Piotr Mikolasch in Lwów he began a new phase of his life devoted to the studies of exploiting kerosene.

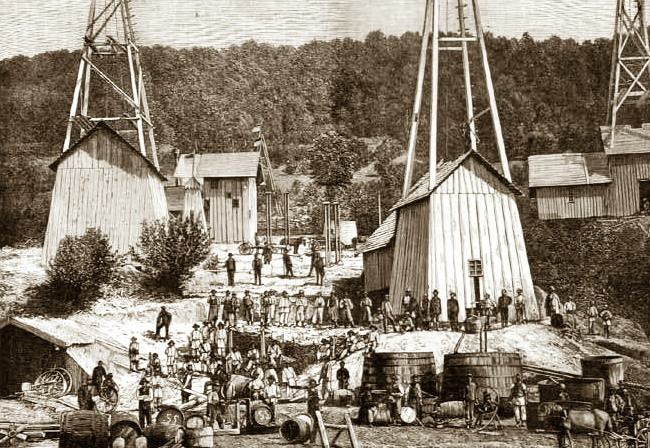
Galician oil wells

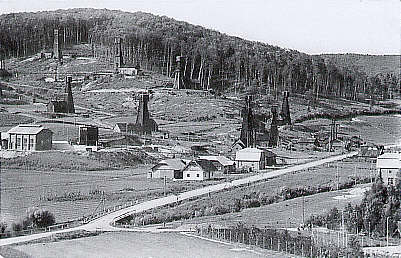
Oil wells, Grabownica Starzeńska, 1930s

=== Petroleum industry and oil lamp ===
While oil was known to exist for a long time in the Subcarpathian-Galician region, it was more commonly used as an animal drug and lubricant, but Łukasiewicz, John Zeh and Mikolasch were the first to distill the liquid in Galicia and in the world and were able to exploit it for lighting and create a brand new industry. In autumn of 1852 Łukasiewicz, Mikolasch and his colleague John Zeh analyzed the oil, which was provided in a few barrels by traders from the town of Drohobych. After pharmaceutical methods and processes the purified oil was obtained and sold in the local pharmacies, but the orders were small due to high prices. In early 1854 Łukasiewicz moved to Gorlice, where he continued his work. He set up many companies together with entrepreneurs and landowners. That same year, he opened the world's first oil "mine" at Bóbrka, near Krosno (still operational as of 2020). At the same time Łukasiewicz continued his work on kerosene lamps. Later that year, he set up the first kerosene street lamp in Gorlice's Zawodzie district. In subsequent years he opened several other oil wells, each as a joint venture with local merchants and businessmen. In 1856 in Ulaszowice, near Jasło, he opened an "oil distillery" — the world's first industrial oil refinery. As demand for kerosene was still low, the plant initially produced mostly artificial asphalt, machine oil, and lubricants. The refinery was destroyed in an 1859 fire, but was rebuilt at Polanka, near Krosno, the following year.

=== Later life and death ===
Łukasiewicz married, in 1857, his niece Honorata Stacherska and after losing their only daughter, Marianna, the couple adopted Walentyna Antoniewicz.

By 1863 Łukasiewicz, who had moved to Jasło in 1858, was a wealthy man. He openly supported the January 1863 Uprising and financed help for refugees. In 1865 he bought a large manor and the village of Chorkówka. There he established yet another oil refinery. Having gained one of the largest fortunes in Galicia, Łukasiewicz promoted the development of the oil industry in the areas of Dukla and Gorlice. He gave his name to several oil-mining enterprises in the area, including oil wells at Ropianka, Wilsznia, Smereczne, Ropa, and Wójtowa. He also became a regional benefactor and founded a spa resort at Bóbrka, a chapel at Chorkówka, and a large church at Zręcin.

As one of the best-known businessmen of his time, Łukasiewicz was elected to the Galician Sejm. In 1877 he also organized the first Oil Industry Congress and founded the National Oil Society. Ignacy Łukasiewicz died in Chorkówka, Kingdom of Galicia and Lodomeria, on 7 January 1882 of pneumonia and was buried in the small cemetery at the nearby (3 kilometers) Zręcin, next to the Gothic Revival church he had financed.

== Quotes ==
"This liquid is the future wealth of the country, it's the wellbeing and prosperity of its inhabitants, it's a new source of income for the poor, and a new branch of industry which shall bear plentiful fruit." – 1854

== See also ==
- Avunculate marriage
- List of Poles
- Petroleum
- Petroleum Trail
- Timeline of Polish science and technology
