= Zwierzyn =

Zwierzyn or Zwierzyń refers to the following places:

- Zwierzyn, Lubusz Voivodeship, Poland
- Gmina Zwierzyn, Lubusz Voivodeship, Poland
- Zwierzyn, West Pomeranian Voivodeship, Poland
- Zwierzyń, Podkarpackie Voivodeship, Poland
- Schwerin, Germany, called Zwierzyn in Polabian and Polish
