= Leśniówka =

- Village
- Location within Poland
- Coordinates: 49°40′N 21°38′E
- Country: Poland
- Voivodeship: Subcarpathian
- County: Krosno
- Gmina: Chorkówka
- Population: 540

Leśniówka [lɛɕˈɲufka] is a village in the administrative district of Gmina Chorkówka, within Krosno County, Subcarpathian Voivodeship, in south-eastern Poland.
