= Uherce Mineralne =

- Village
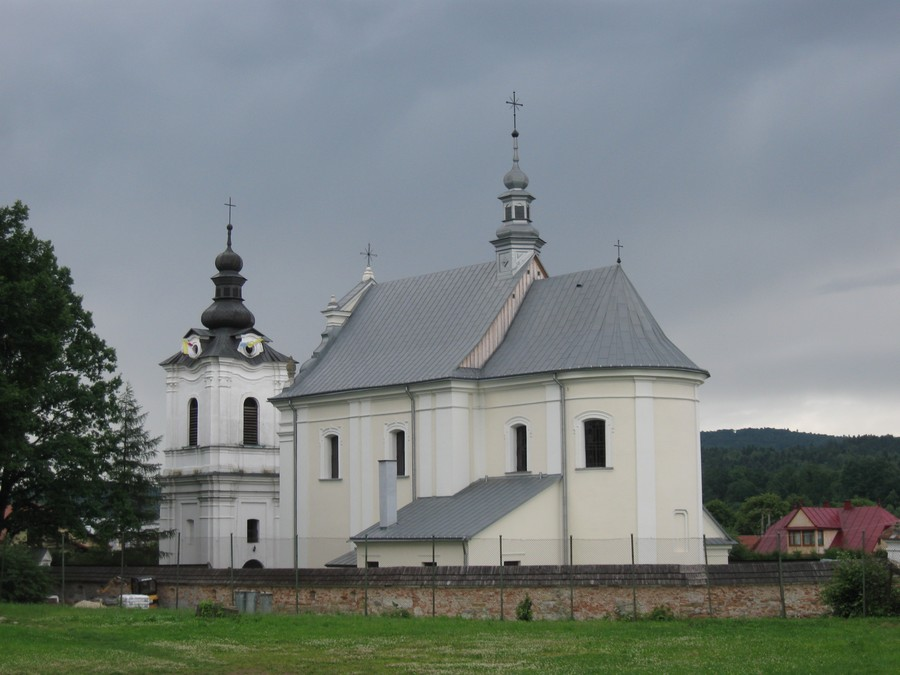
- Church of Saint Stanislaus

- Location within Poland
- Coordinates: 49°27′54″N 22°24′15″E
- Country: Poland
- Voivodeship: Subcarpathian
- County: Lesko
- Gmina: Olszanica

Population
  - Total: 1,400

Uherce Mineralne [uˈxɛrt͡sɛ mʲinɛˈralnɛ] is a village in the administrative district of Gmina Olszanica, within Lesko County, Subcarpathian Voivodeship, in south-eastern Poland.
