= Gmina Chorkówka =

Gmina Chorkówka Chorkówka Commune
- Gmina
- Flag Coat of arms
- Interactive map of Gmina Chorkówka
- Coordinates (Chorkówka): 49°39′N 21°41′E
- Country: Poland
- Voivodeship: Subcarpathian
- County: Krosno County
- Seat: Chorkówka

Area
  - Total: 77.75 km^{2} (30.02 sq mi)

Population (2006)
  - Total: 13,158
  - Density: 169.2/km^{2} (438.3/sq mi)
- Website: http://www.chorkowka.ugm.pl

Gmina Chorkówka is a rural gmina in Krosno County, Subcarpathian Voivodeship, in south-eastern Poland. Its seat is the village of Chorkówka, which lies approximately 7 kilometres (4 mi) south-west of Krosno and 49 km (30 mi) south-west of the regional capital Rzeszów.

The gmina covers an area of 77.75 square kilometres (30.0 sq mi), and as of 2006 its total population is 13,158.

== Villages ==
Gmina Chorkówka contains the villages and settlements of Bóbrka, Chorkówka, Draganowa, Faliszówka, Kobylany, Kopytowa, Leśniówka, Machnówka, Poraj, Sulistrowa, Świerzowa Polska, Szczepańcowa, Żeglce and Zręcin.

== Neighbouring gminas ==
Gmina Chorkówka is bordered by the city of Krosno and by the gminas of Dukla, Jedlicze, Miejsce Piastowe, Nowy Żmigród and Tarnowiec.
