= Machnówka =

- Village
- Location within Poland
- Coordinates: 49°39′N 21°43′E
- Country: Poland
- Voivodeship: Subcarpathian
- County: Krosno
- Gmina: Chorkówka

Machnówka [maxˈnufka] is a village in the administrative district of Gmina Chorkówka, within Krosno County, Subcarpathian Voivodeship, in south-eastern Poland.
