= Rudenka =

- Village
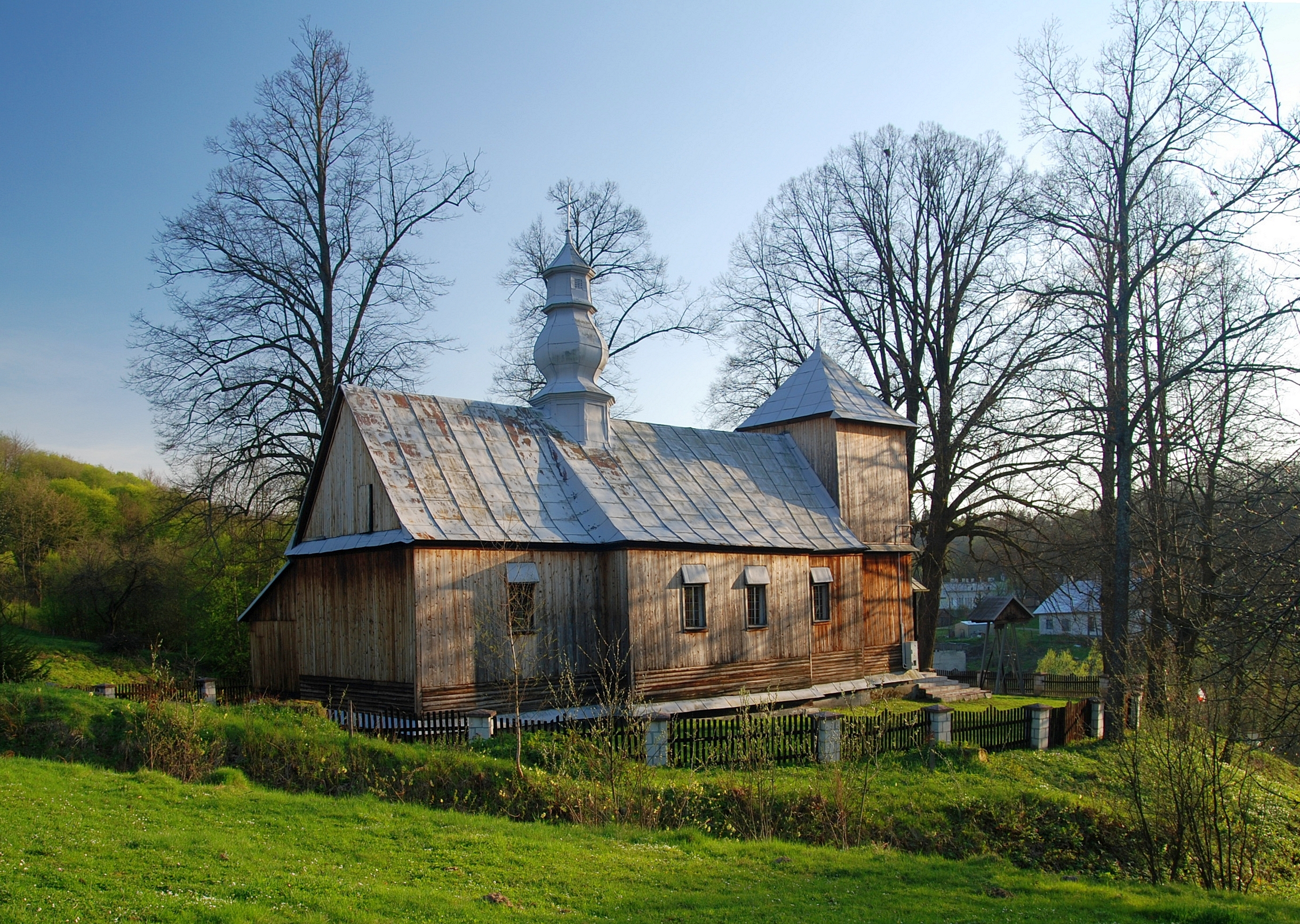
- Greek Catholic church

- Location within Poland
- Coordinates: 49°30′N 22°26′E
- Country: Poland
- Voivodeship: Subcarpathian
- County: Lesko
- Gmina: Olszanica
- Website: www.rudenka24.pl

Rudenka [ruˈdɛŋka] is a village in the administrative district of Gmina Olszanica, within Lesko County, Subcarpathian Voivodeship, in south-eastern Poland.
