= Andrew Bobola =

Polish Catholic priest and saint (1591–1657)

Saint Andrew Bobola SJ
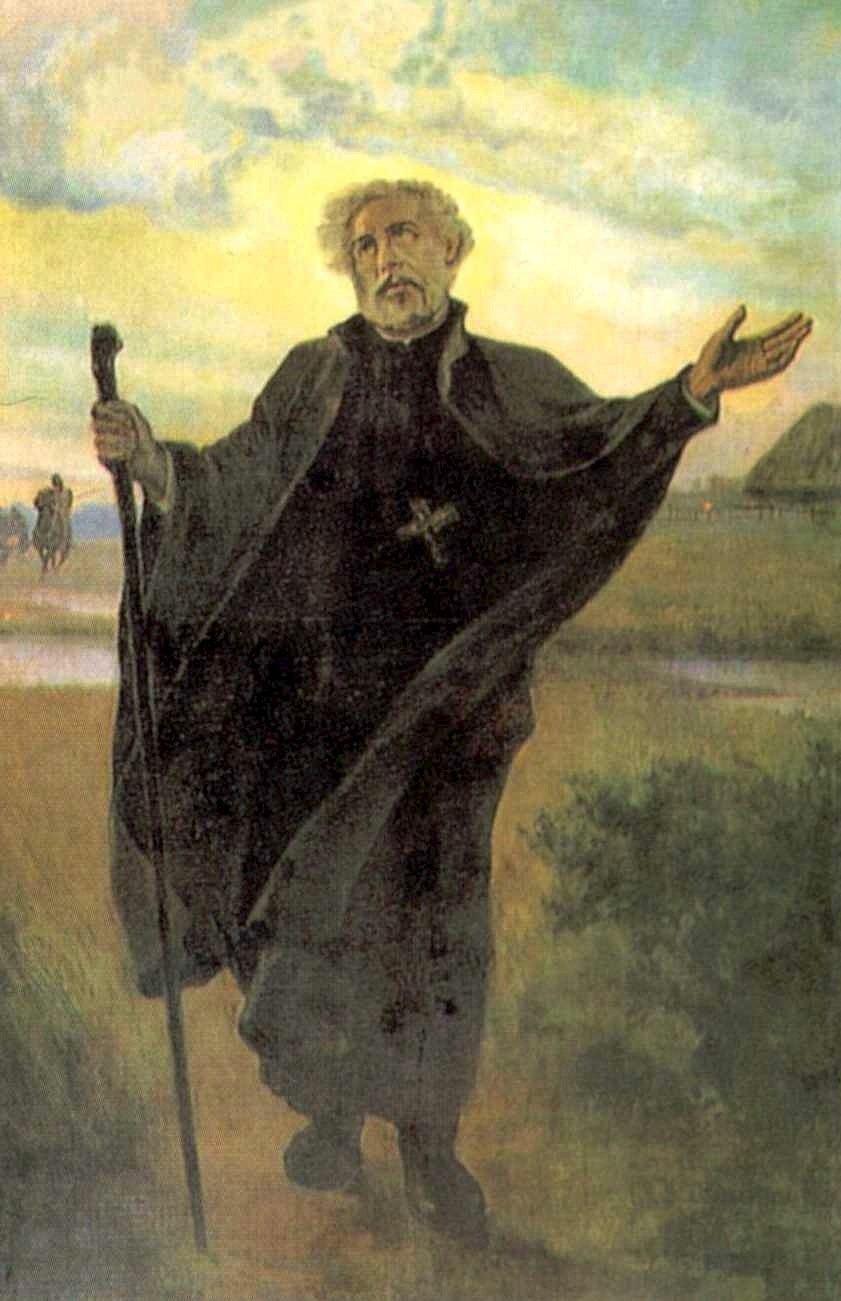

Martyr of Poland, Apostle of Lithuania
- Born: 1591; Strachocina, Sandomir Palatine, Lesser Poland, Crown of the Kingdom of Poland, Polish–Lithuanian Commonwealth.
- Died: 16 May 1657; Janów, Grand Duchy of Lithuania, Polish–Lithuanian Commonwealth
- Venerated in: Catholic Church
- Beatified: 30 October 1853, Rome, Papal States by Pope Pius IX
- Canonized: 17 April 1938, Vatican City by Pope Pius XI
- Major shrine: Shrine of Saint Andrew Bobola, Warsaw, Poland
- Feast: 16 May
- Patronage: Poland; Archdiocese of Warsaw

Andrew Bobola, SJ (Polish: Andrzej Bobola; 1591 – 16 May 1657) was a Polish missionary and martyr of the Society of Jesus, known as the "Apostle of Lithuania" and the "hunter of souls". He was beaten and tortured to death during the Khmelnytsky Uprising. He was canonized in 1938 by Pope Pius XI.

== Life ==
The progenitor of the Bobola family is believed to have been Bobola, who lived in the first half of the 13th century in Silesia. He was a subject of Duke Henry the Bearded and a łązęka—a free peasant farmer. It is possible that he was already granted knightly status and the Leliwa coat of arms. He certainly founded the family seat in Bobolice. However, only a few decades later, his heirs lost Bobolice to the Cistercians from Henryków for raubritterism.

In the first half of the 14th century, the Bobola family appears in the circle of the powerful Tarnowski family, also bearing the Leliwa coat of arms, as well as at the Polish royal court, where they gained considerable influence. Over time, the family expanded, although many of its branches maintained a middle-class status.

The exact origins of Andrew Bobola were a matter of controversy, as various armorials and biographies offered conflicting accounts.

According to Father Jan Poplatek, a Jesuit and researcher of the saint's life, Andrew Bobola came from a more prominent branch of the Bobola family. His grandfather was said to be Jan Bobola of Piaski, the administrator of Jarosław, owner of several villages, and holder of a house in the Podgórze, near Kraków. This property was reportedly granted to him in recognition of his services by Kings John I Albert and Alexander Jagiellon.

Jan had several children, among them Krzysztof, who, from his marriage to Elżbieta Wielopolska, had three sons: Jan, Andrzej, and Mikołaj. Andrzej achieved the highest position, becoming the Grand Chamberlain of the Crown and a royal secretary. Jan was a landowner and the father of, among others, Sebastian, a Jesuit and university professor, and Kacper, a canon of Kraków and royal secretary. The third brother, Mikołaj, heir to the estate of Strachocina near Krosno, was the father of Saint Andrew Bobola.

Bobola was born in 1591 into a noble family in the Sandomierz Voivodeship of the Kingdom of Poland, then a constituent part of the Polish–Lithuanian Commonwealth. In 1611 he entered the Society of Jesus in Vilnius, then in the Grand Duchy of Lithuania, the other part of the Commonwealth. He subsequently professed solemn vows and was ordained in 1622, after which he served for several years as an advisor, preacher, superior of a Jesuit residence, and other jobs in various places.

From 1652 Bobola also worked as a country "missionary", in various locations of Lithuania: these included Polotsk, where he was probably stationed in 1655, and also Pinsk, (both now in Belarus). On 16 May 1657, during the Khmelnytsky Uprising, he was captured in Pinsk, and then killed in the village of Janów (now Ivanava, Belarus), by the Cossacks of Bohdan Chmielnicki.

Several descriptions of Bobola's death exist, with these invariably involving him being subjected to a variety of tortures before being killed:

- One account states that Bobola "had just offered up the holy sacrifice" when the Cossacks entered Pinsk; upon seeing them, he believed his death to be imminent and thus "fell upon his knees, raised his eyes and his hands [and] exclaimed, 'Lord, thy will be done!'". He was then captured and stripped of his habit, tied to a tree, and had a crown placed on his head, after which he was scourged, burnt with torches, and had an eye torn out; a sword was used to carve shapes resembling a tonsure and a chasuble into his head and his back respectively. The Cossacks also removed the skin from his fingers and forcibly inserted needles under his fingernails. Bobola continuously prayed for his torturers until his tongue was torn out and his head crushed, thereby killing him.
- A second account states that the Cossacks first tried to make Bobola renounce his religion; when he refused, he was stripped, tied to a hedge, and whipped. A crown of twigs was mockingly placed on his head and he was then dragged to a butcher's shop where, after continued refusals to renounce his faith, the skin was torn off his chest and back and holes were cut into his palms. Bobola was subjected to further tortures for two hours before having an awl driven into his heart, being strung up by his feet, and being killed with a sabre just as a Polish rescue party entered Janów.
- A third account states that Bobola was seized and severely beaten by two Cossacks who then tied him to their saddles in order to take him to Janów; there, he was subjected to tortures including burning, strangulation, and flaying, before finally being killed with a sabre.

In contrast to the above, a Soviet Russian examination of Bobola's corpse in January 1923 found no traces of gross mechanical violence on the surviving parts of the corpse that could establish cause of death.

== Veneration ==
Andrzej Bobola memorial church in Janów Poleski, 19th-century image

Bobola's body was originally buried in the Jesuit church in Pinsk. It was later moved to their church in Polotsk. By the beginning of the 18th century, however, nobody knew where Bobola's body was buried. In 1701 Father Martin Godebski, S.J., the rector of the Pinsk College, reputedly had a vision of Bobola. This caused him to order a search for the body. It was reportedly found completely incorrupt, which is recognized by the Church and its supporters as evidence of holiness.

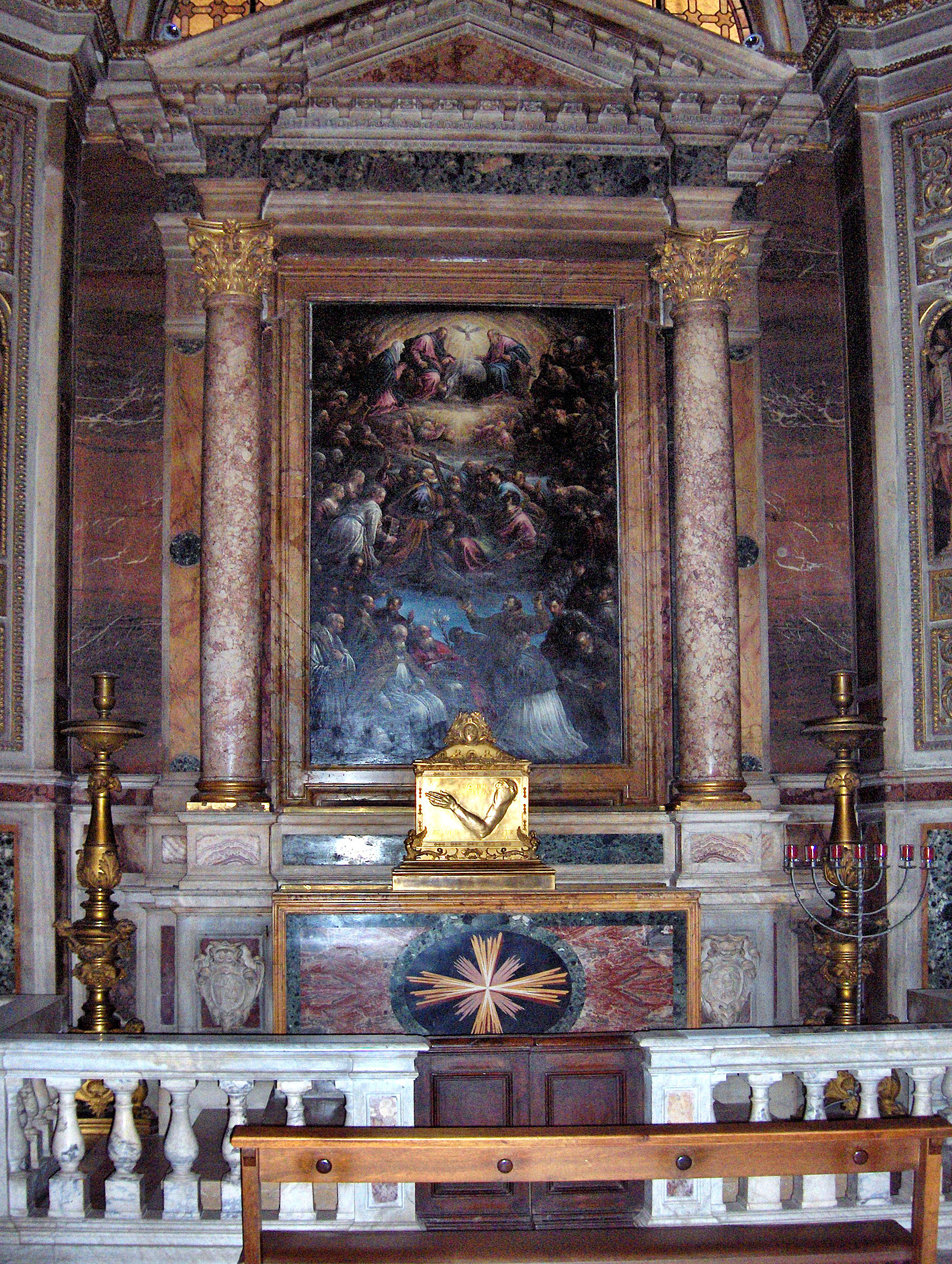
The altar with the relics of the arm of Andrew Bobola in the church of Il Gesù in Rome

On 23 June 1922, the coffin with the relics of Andrew Bobola was opened in Polotsk and an examination was carried out. In December 1922, the coffin with the corpse of Andrew Bobola was delivered to Moscow and placed in the hall of the Popular Exhibition on Health Protection of the People's Commissariat for Health. In January 1923, he was examined by a special commission and an act was drawn up, according to which the corpse of Andrew Bobola is a naturally mummified corpse, which is in the stage of slow decomposition. The results of the examinations were published in 1924 in the journal Revolution and Church. Later described by an American journalist as a "remarkably well-preserved mummy", to the Museum of Hygiene of People's Commissioners of Health in Moscow. The whereabouts of the remains were not known to the Catholic authorities, and Pope Pius XI charged the Papal Famine Relief Mission in Russia, headed by American Jesuit Father Edmund A. Walsh, with the task of locating and "rescuing" them. In October 1923—as a kind of "pay" for help during famine—the remains were released to Walsh and his assistant director, Father Louis J. Gallagher, S.J. Well-packed by the two Jesuits, they were delivered to the Holy See by Gallagher on All Saints' Day (1 November) 1923. In May 1924, the relics were installed in Rome's Church of the Gesù, the main church of the Society of Jesus.

Since 19 June 1938 the body has been venerated at a shrine in Warsaw, with an arm remaining at the original shrine in Rome (see photo at left).

Declared blessed by Pope Pius IX on 30 October 1853, Bobola was canonized by Pope Pius XI on 17 April 1938. His feast day was originally celebrated by the Jesuits on 23 May, but it is now generally celebrated on 16 May. In 2002, the Bishops' Conference of Poland declared Bobola a patron saint of Poland.

== See also ==
- List of Catholic saints

== Bibliography ==
- Popłatek, Jan (1936). Błogosławiony Andrzej Bobola Towarzystwa Jezusowego. Życie - męczeństwo - kult [Blessed Andrew Bobola of the Society of Jesus: Life – Martyrdom – Veneration] (in Polish). Kraków.
