= Zręcin =

- Village
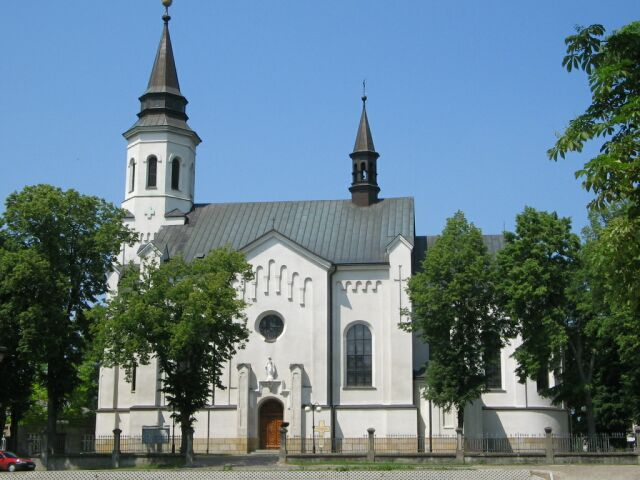
- Saint Stanislaus Church

- Location within Poland
- Coordinates: 49°40′4″N 21°41′26″E
- Country: Poland
- Voivodeship: Subcarpathian
- County: Krosno
- Gmina: Chorkówka
- Population (approx.): 2,000

Zręcin [ˈzrɛnt͡ɕin] is a village in the administrative district of Gmina Chorkówka, within Krosno County, Subcarpathian Voivodeship, in south-eastern Poland.

Polish inventor Ignacy Łukasiewicz is buried at the local cemetery.
