= Orelec =

- Village
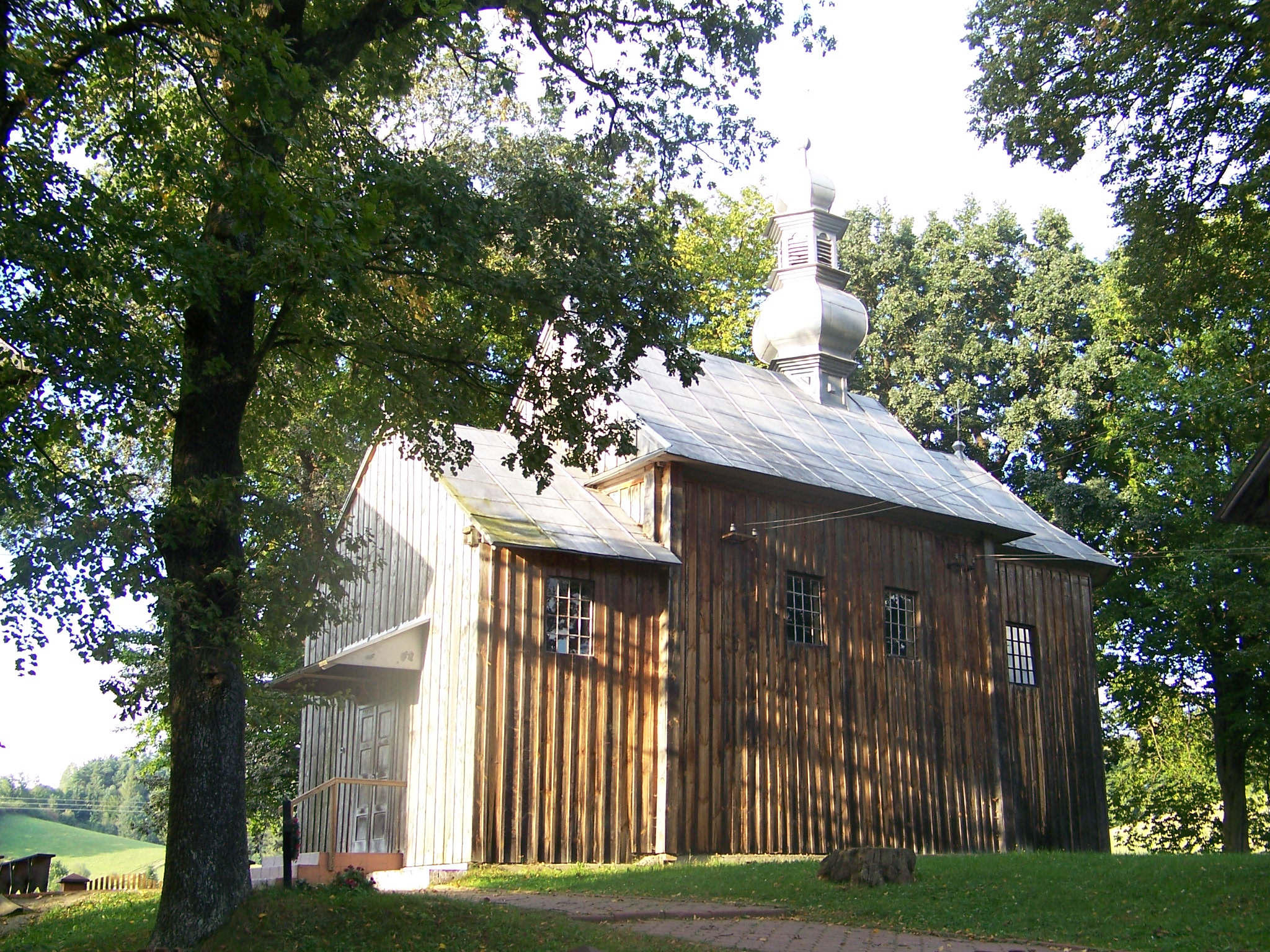
- Church of the Nativity of Saint Anne

- Location within Poland
- Coordinates: 49°27′N 22°27′E
- Country: Poland
- Voivodeship: Subcarpathian
- County: Lesko
- Gmina: Olszanica

Population
  - Total: 420

Orelec [ɔˈrɛlɛt͡s] is a village in the administrative district of Gmina Olszanica, within Lesko County, Subcarpathian Voivodeship, in south-eastern Poland.
