= Zaduszniki, Podkarpackie Voivodeship =

Zaduszniki
- Village
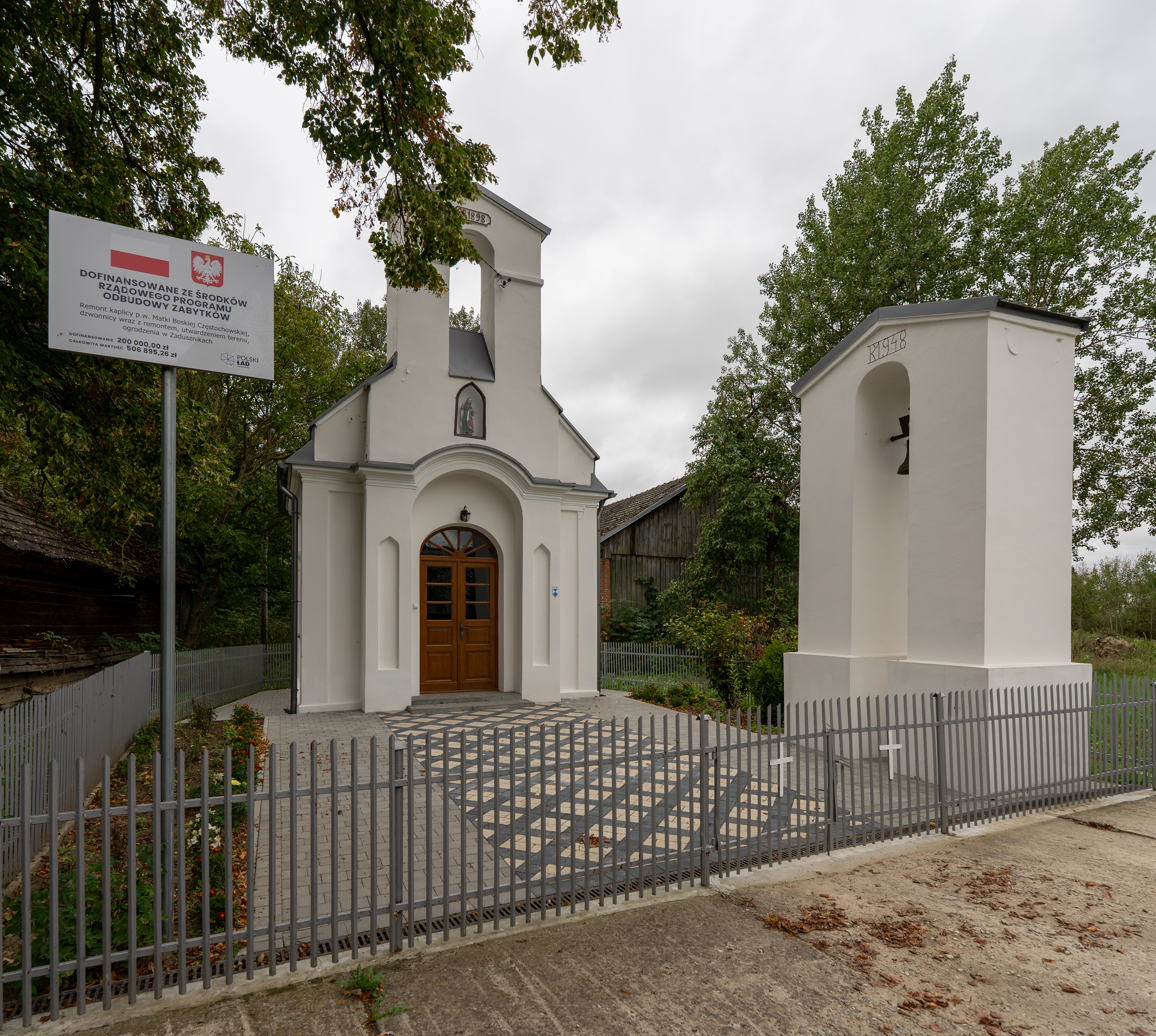
- Chapel of Our Lady of Częstochowa

- Location within Poland
- Coordinates: 50°28′N 21°28′E
- Country: Poland
- Voivodeship: Subcarpathian
- County: Mielec
- Gmina: Padew Narodowa

Population
  - Total: 260

Zaduszniki [zaduʂˈniki] is a village in the administrative district of Gmina Padew Narodowa, within Mielec County, Subcarpathian Voivodeship, in south-eastern Poland.

Pharmacist and oil pioneer Ignacy Łukasiewicz (1822–1882) was born in Zaduszniki.
