= Gmina Olszanica =

Gmina Olszanica Olszanica Commune
- Gmina
- Coat of arms
- Interactive map of Gmina Olszanica
- Coordinates (Olszanica): 49°28′N 22°27′E
- Country: Poland
- Voivodeship: Subcarpathian
- County: Lesko
- Seat: Olszanica

Area
  - Total: 94.02 km^{2} (36.30 sq mi)

Population (2006)
  - Total: 5,059
  - Density: 53.81/km^{2} (139.4/sq mi)
- Website: http://www.olszanica.pl

Gmina Olszanica is a rural gmina (administrative district) in Lesko County, Subcarpathian Voivodeship, in south-eastern Poland. Its seat is the village of Olszanica, which lies approximately 9 kilometres (6 mi) east of Lesko and 71 km (44 mi) south-east of the regional capital Rzeszów.

The gmina covers an area of 94.02 square kilometres (36.3 sq mi), and as of 2006 its total population is 5,059.

The gmina contains part of the protected area called Słonne Mountains Landscape Park.

== Villages ==
Gmina Olszanica contains the villages and settlements of Olszanica, Orelec, Paszowa, Rudenka, Stefkowa, Uherce Mineralne, Wańkowa and Zwierzyń.

== Neighbouring gminas ==
Gmina Olszanica is bordered by the gminas of Bircza, Lesko, Solina, Tyrawa Wołoska and Ustrzyki Dolne.
