= Stefkowa =

- Village
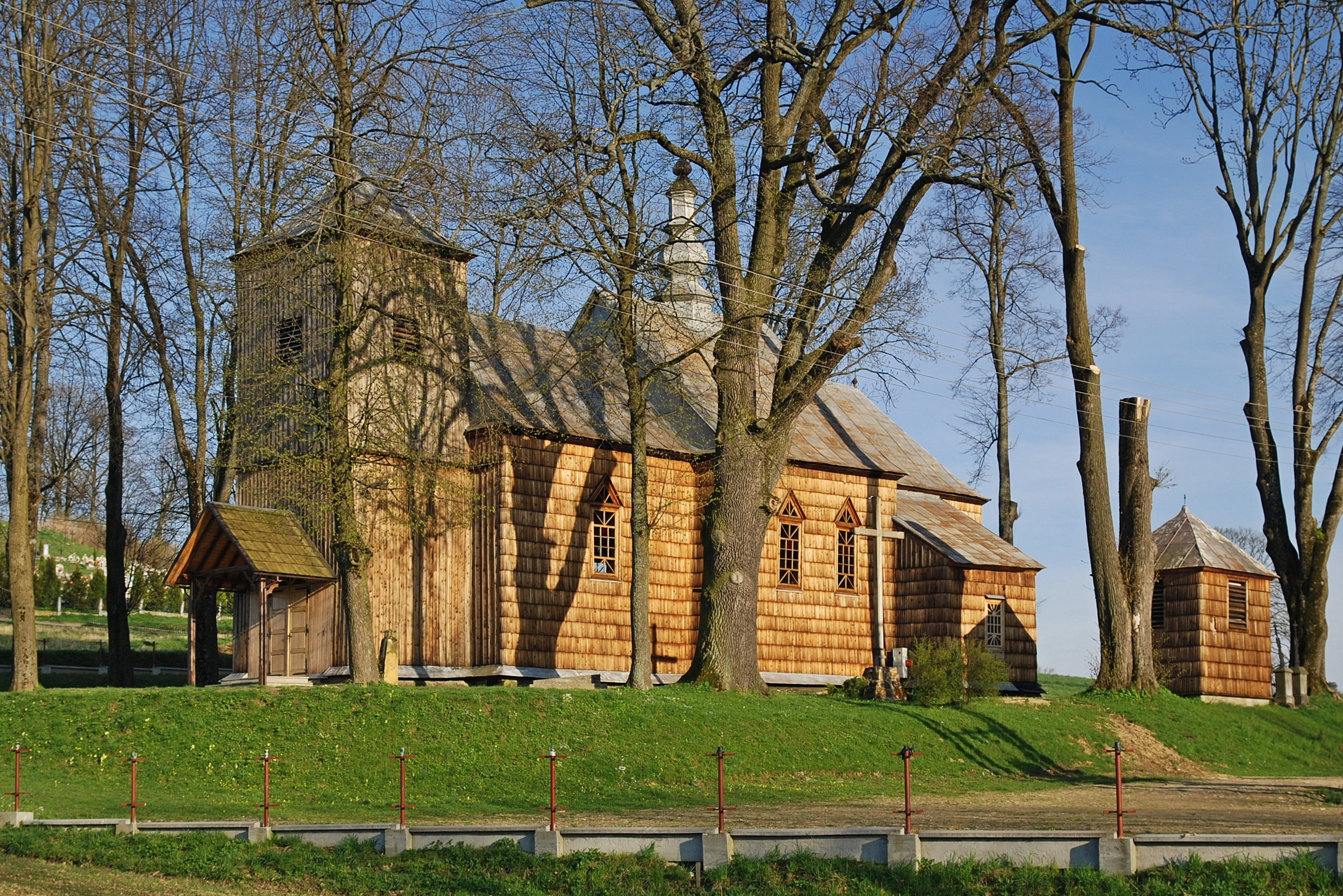
- Greek Catholic church of Saint Paraskevas

- Location within Poland
- Coordinates: 49°28′N 22°28′E
- Country: Poland
- Voivodeship: Subcarpathian
- County: Lesko
- Gmina: Olszanica
- Website: http://www.stefkowa.eu/

Stefkowa [stɛfˈkɔva] is a village in the administrative district of Gmina Olszanica, within Lesko County, Subcarpathian Voivodeship, in south-eastern Poland.
