= Olszanica, Podkarpackie Voivodeship =

Olszanica
- Village
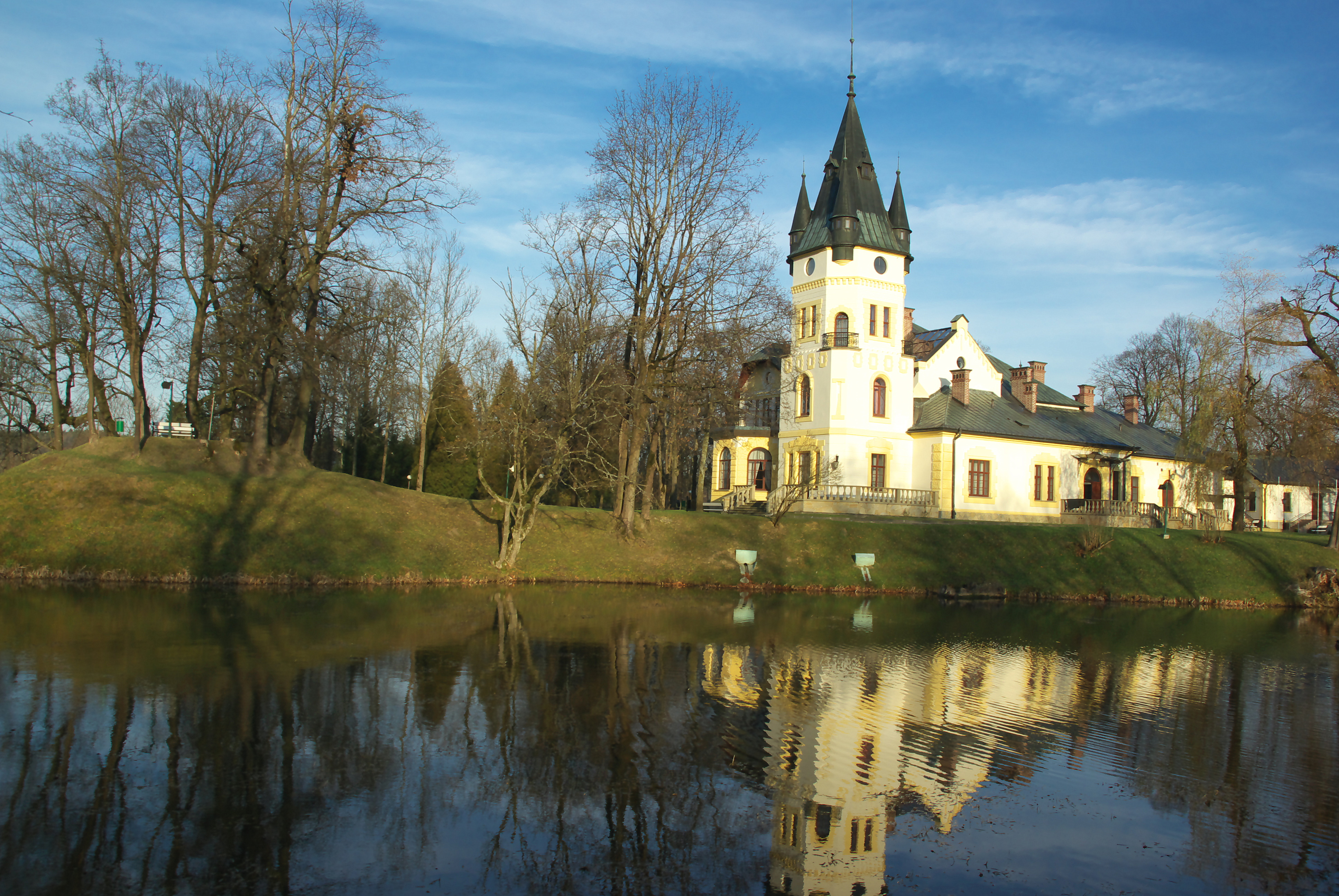
- Olszanica Palace

- Location within Poland
- Coordinates: 49°28′N 22°27′E
- Country: Poland
- Voivodeship: Subcarpathian
- County: Lesko
- Gmina: Olszanica

Population
  - Total: 1,100

Olszanica [ɔlʂaˈɲit͡sa] is a village in Lesko County, Subcarpathian Voivodeship, in south-eastern Poland. It is the seat of the gmina (administrative district) called Gmina Olszanica.

== Gallery ==
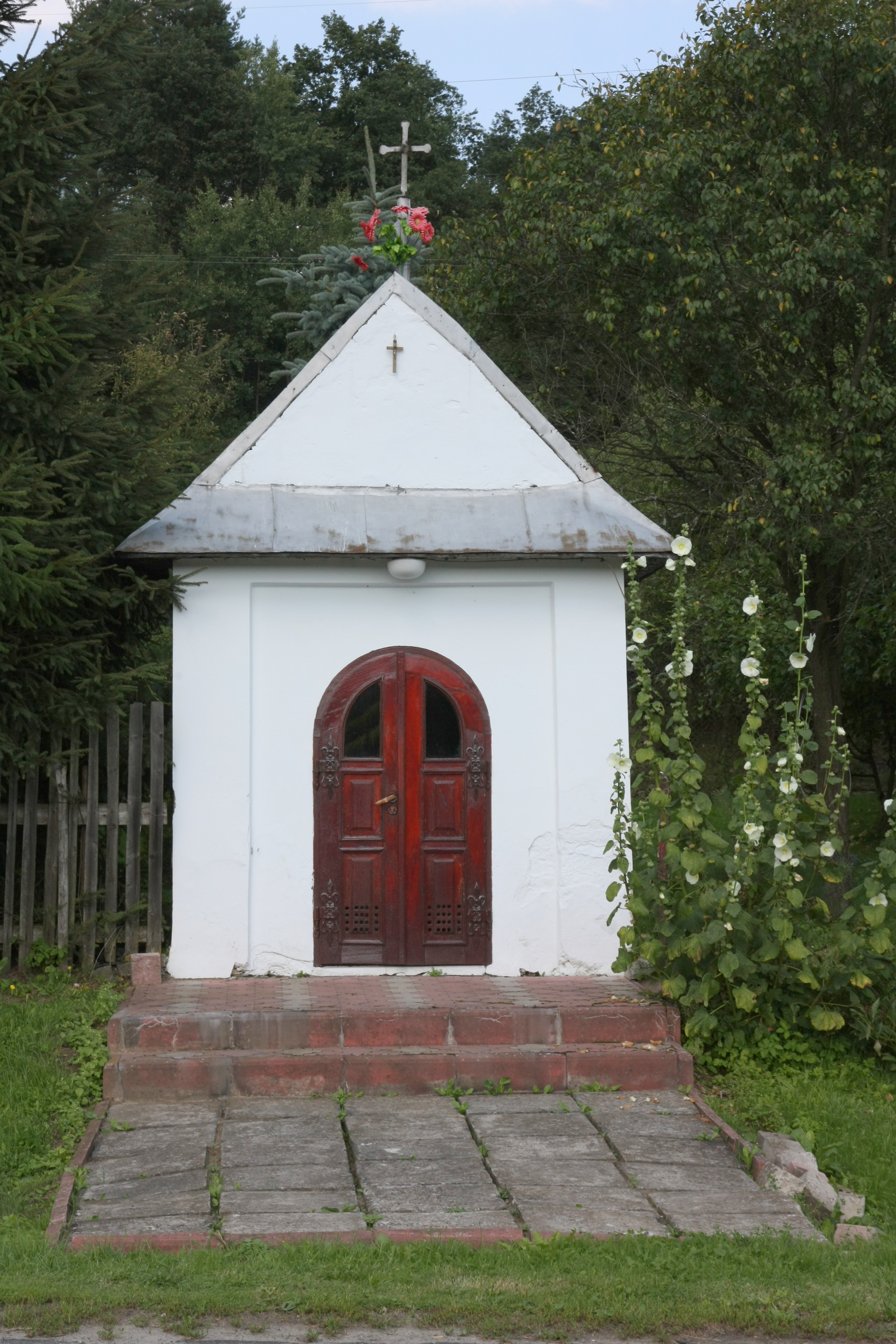
Olszanica shrine

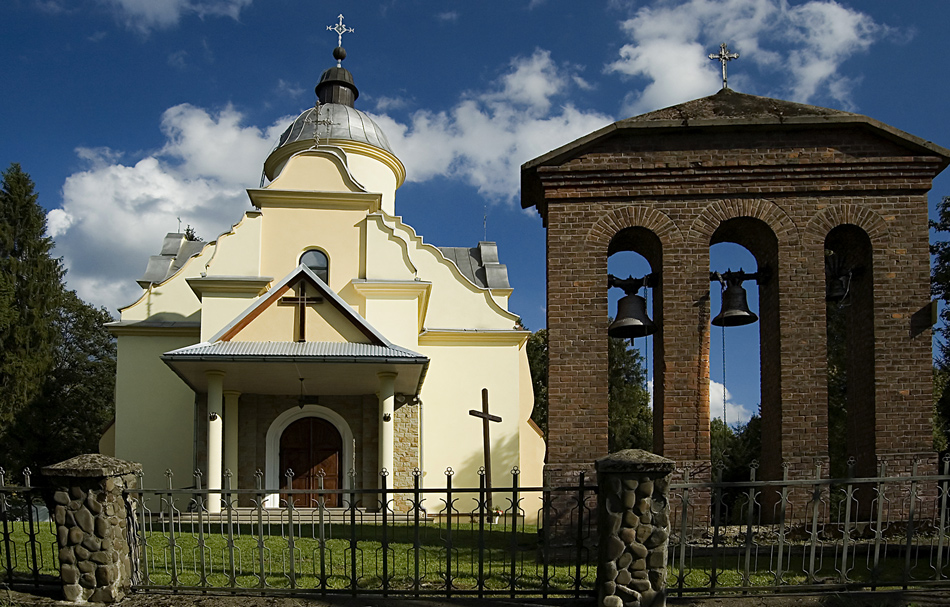
Greek Catholic church
