= Strachocina =

- Village
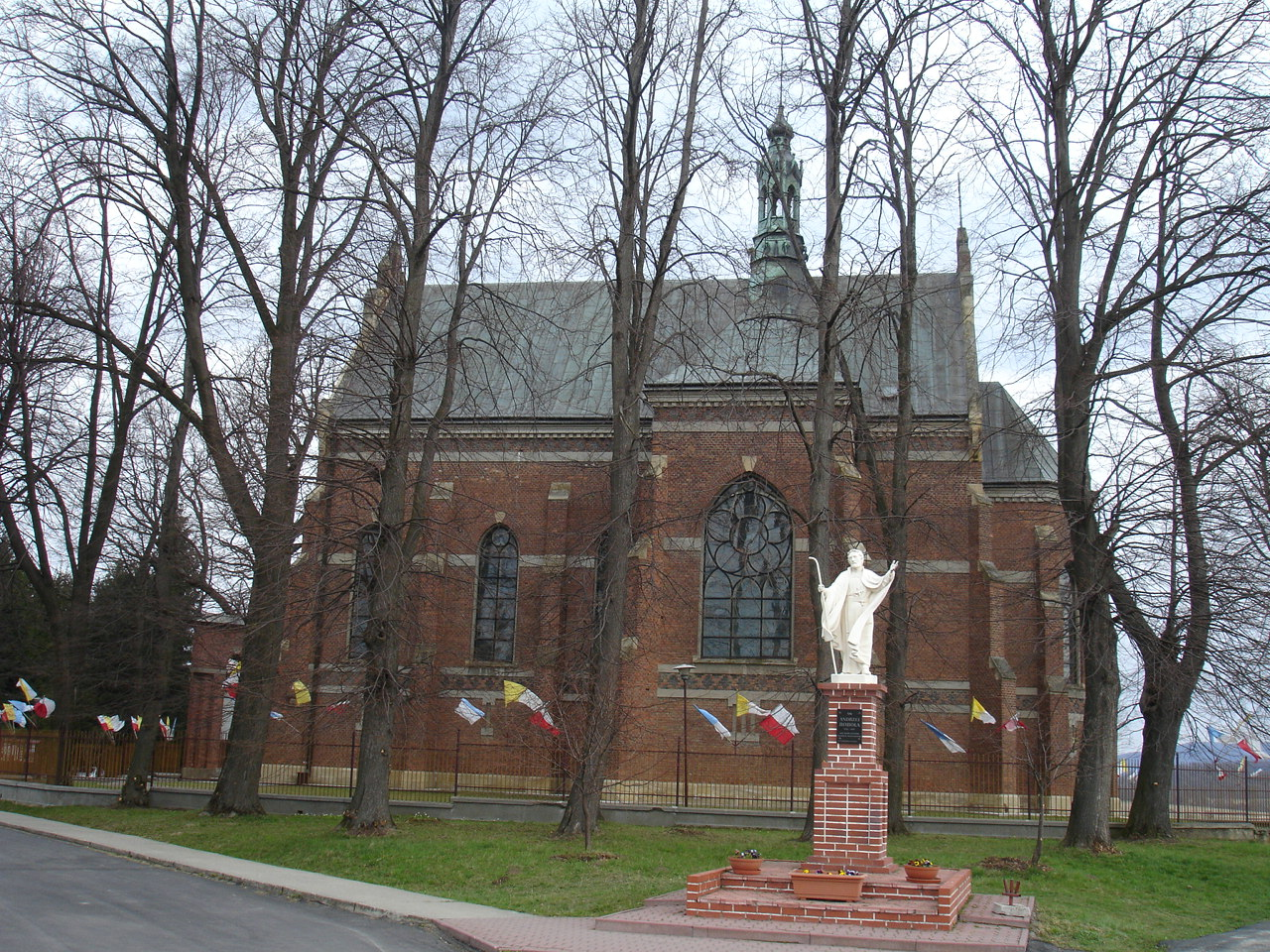
- Saint Catherine of Alexandria church

- Location within Poland
- Coordinates: 49°37′N 22°06′E
- Country: Poland
- Voivodeship: Subcarpathian
- Powiat: Sanok
- Gmina: Sanok
- Established: May 10, 1369

Government
  - Mayor: Robert Kubowicz

Area
  - Total: 1.2 km^{2} (0.46 sq mi)
- Elevation: 321 m (1,053 ft)

Population (2006)
  - Total: 1,100
- Time zone: UTC+1 (CET)
  - Summer (DST): UTC+2 (CEST)
- Postal code: 38-508
- Area code: +48 13
- Car Plates: RSA

Strachocina ([straxɔˈt͡ɕina]) is a village in Subcarpathian Voivodeship in the southeastern part of Poland. During the partitions of Poland, this region of the country belonged to Austria and was called Galicia. Today it contains about 300 houses and 1100 inhabitants, and is about 12 km^{2} (4.6 sq mi). It is the birthplace of St. Andrew Bobola.

Strachocina belongs to the Gmina Sanok in Sanok County. In earlier times the region was called Ziemia Sanocka (The Land of Sanok). Its capital was Sanok, which is still the largest town in the close neighborhood. Strachocina is situated around 11 km (7 mi) west.

Its foundation act, issued by King Casimir the Great, is dated on May 10, 1369. The further history of the village is unclear. At the place of today's Strachocina once there were as much as four villages at the same time: Strachocina, Strachocina Wola, Szwanczyce and Meszewa.

Local tradition has it that there lived three kinds of people in the village: serfs (persons in a condition of feudal servitude, required to render services to a lord and attached to the lord's land), tenants of the estate, and szlachta zaściankowa (village noblemen).

In 16th to 17th centuries tenants of the estate were Bobolas. One of their sons, Andrzej, was recognized a saint (a martyr) by the Roman Catholic Church. He was born in Strachocina in 1591. Today they show in the local church an old baptismal basin made of stone and assert that it was used to baptize the future saint. In a field chapel that was built in the 1990s there are celebrated solemnities dedicated to Saint Andrew.

At the border of the village there is a parish church of St. Catharina from the turn of 19th and 20th centuries. Near it one can find a monument of Saint Andrew, 600-year-old oak, a St. Maximilian cloister for nuns, and a newly built pilgrim's hostel. The church is neo-gothic.

Since the end of 1980s, Strachocina has been the local center of the cult of St Andrew. Every May 16 there is a celebration attended by many pilgrims.

In the woods of Strachocina there is a natural gas reservoir and drilling area which is now used for the underground storage of natural gas from Russia. It is a stop on the Petroleum Trail.

== See also ==
- Lendians
- Pogórzanie
- Ostsiedlung
- Great Moravia
- Galicia (Eastern Europe)
