= Świerzowa Polska =

- Village
- Location within Poland
- Coordinates: 49°40′39″N 21°42′29″E
- Country: Poland
- Voivodeship: Subcarpathian
- County: Krosno
- Gmina: Chorkówka
- Population: 2,076
- Website: http://www.chorkowka.net/swierzowa-polska/

Świerzowa Polska (Polish pronunciation: [ɕfjɛˈʐɔva ˈpɔlska]) is a village in the administrative district of Gmina Chorkówka, within Krosno County, Subcarpathian Voivodeship, in south-eastern Poland.
