= Zwierzyń, Podkarpackie Voivodeship =

Zwierzyń
- Village
- Location within Poland
- Coordinates: 49°27′N 22°23′E
- Country: Poland
- Voivodeship: Subcarpathian
- County: Lesko
- Gmina: Olszanica

Zwierzyń [ˈzvʲɛʐɨɲ] is a village in the administrative district of Gmina Olszanica, within Lesko County, Subcarpathian Voivodeship, in south-eastern Poland.
