= Chorkówka =

- Village
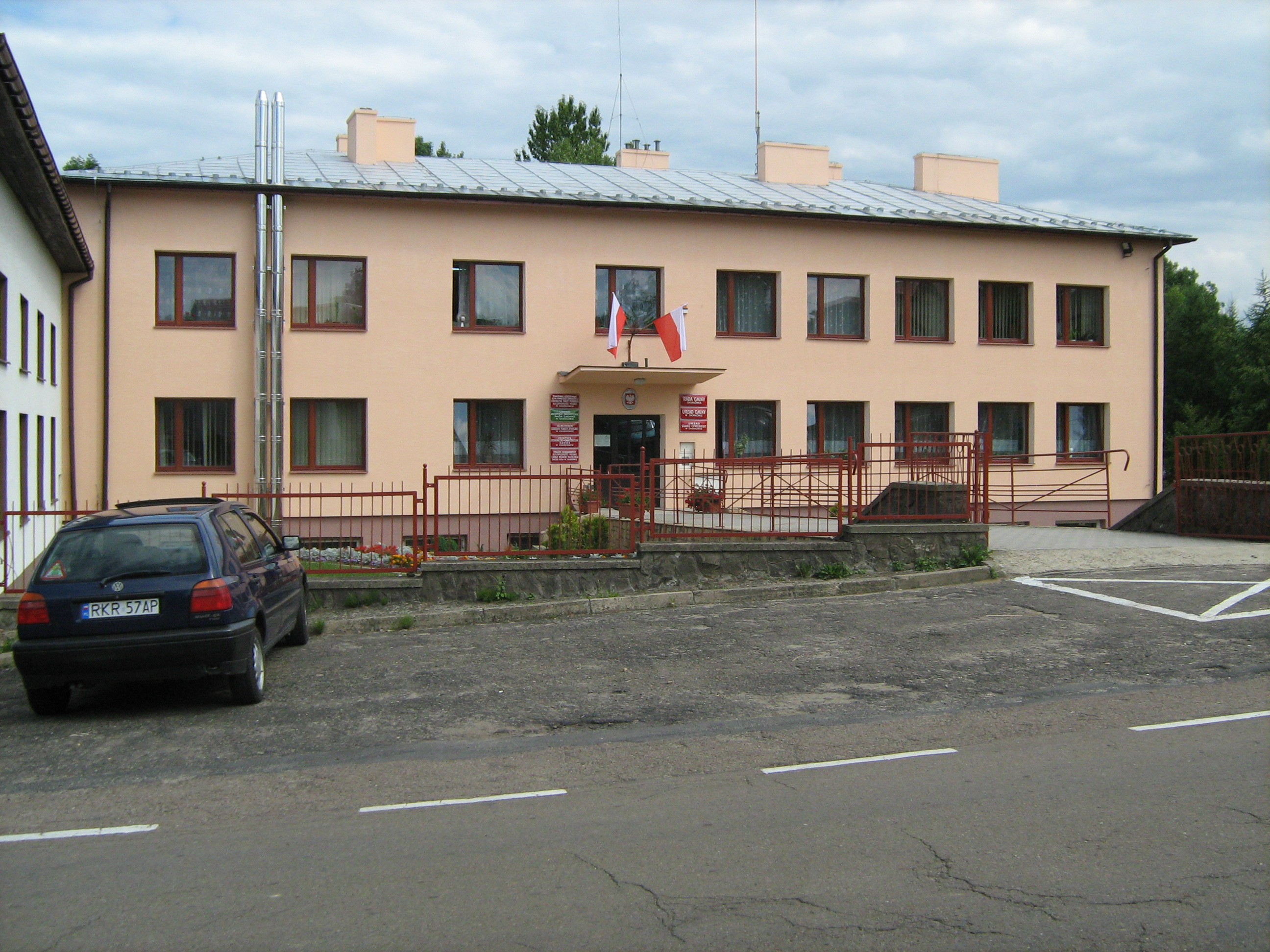
- Gmina administration building

- Flag Coat of arms

- Location within Poland
- Coordinates: 49°39′N 21°41′E
- Country: Poland
- Voivodeship: Subcarpathian
- County: Krosno
- Gmina: Chorkówka
- Population: 760
- Website: http://www.chorkowka.net

Chorkówka [xɔrˈkufka] is a village in Krosno County, Subcarpathian Voivodeship, in south-eastern Poland. It is the seat of the gmina (administrative district) called Gmina Chorkówka.
