= Wańkowa =

- Village
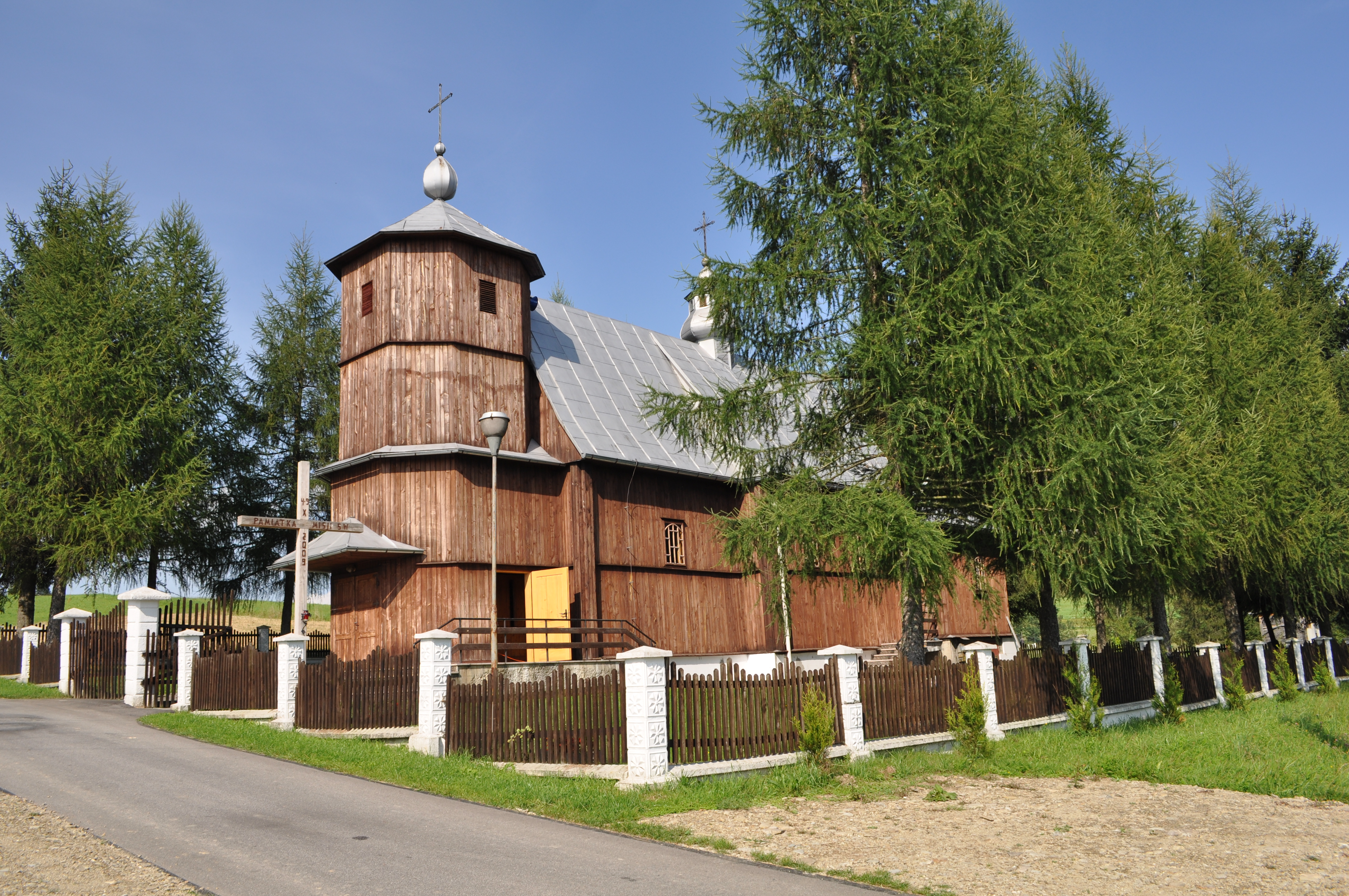
- Church in Wańkowa

- Location within Poland
- Coordinates: 49°30′33″N 22°28′36″E
- Country: Poland
- Voivodeship: Subcarpathian
- County: Lesko
- Gmina: Olszanica

Wańkowa [vaɲˈkɔva] is a village in the administrative district of Gmina Olszanica, within Lesko County, Subcarpathian Voivodeship, in south-eastern Poland.
