= Bóbrka, Gmina Chorkówka =

Bóbrka
- Village
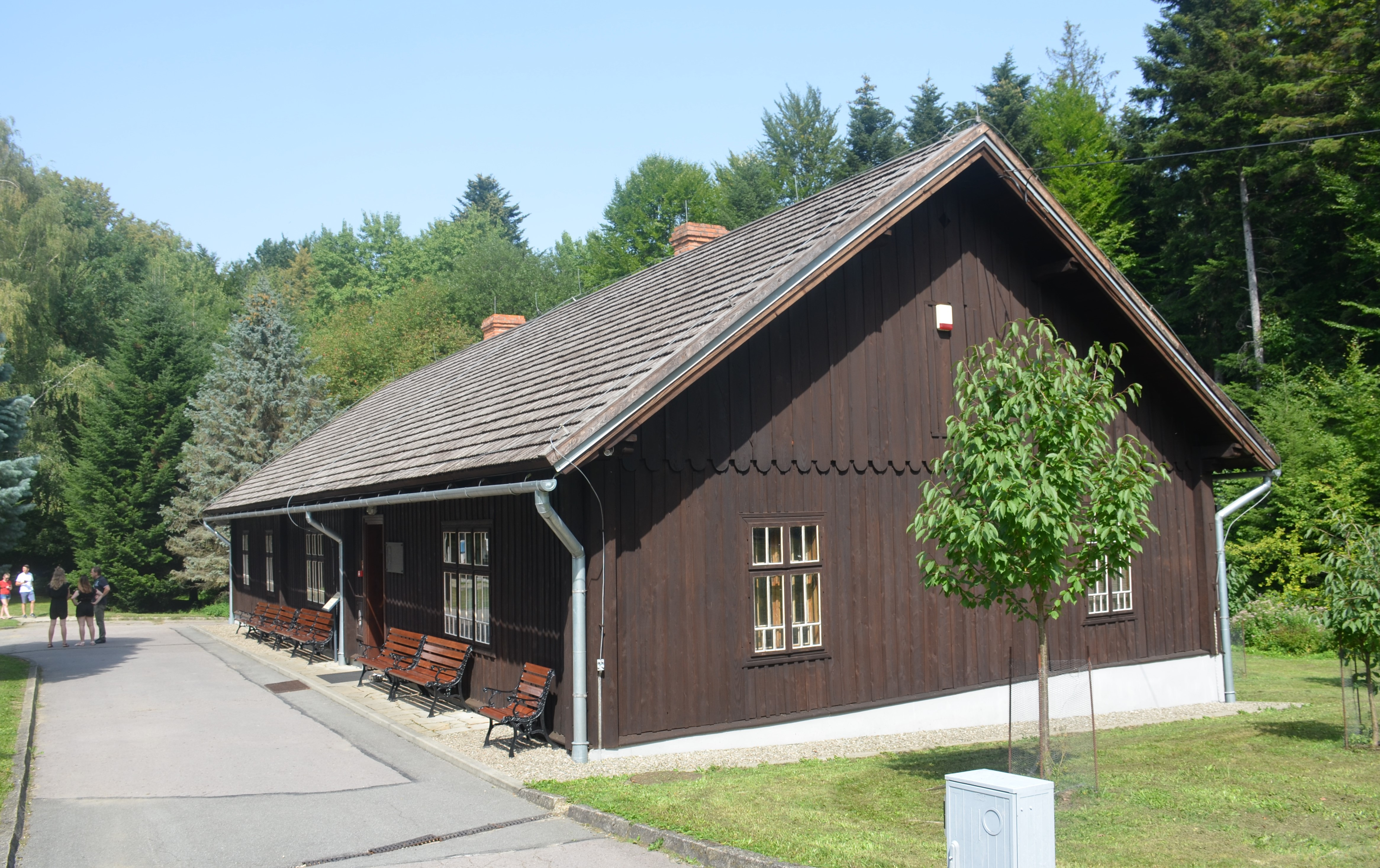
- Historic oil field administration building

- Location within Poland
- Coordinates: 49°37′58″N 21°41′55″E
- Country: Poland
- Voivodeship: Subcarpathian
- County: Krosno
- Gmina: Chorkówka

Population
  - Total: 800
- Time zone: UTC+1 (CET)
  - Summer (DST): UTC+2 (CEST)
- Vehicle registration: RKR

Historic Monument of Poland
- Official name: Bóbrka – oldest oil mine
- Designated: 2018-12-10
- Reference no.: Dz. U., 2019, No. 75

Bóbrka [ˈbubrka] is a village in the administrative district of Gmina Chorkówka, within Krosno County, Subcarpathian Voivodeship, in south-eastern Poland.

Bóbrka with the surrounding area from Krosno to Gorlice is among the oldest places where the roots of world oil industry started. In the forest near Bóbrka the world's first oil field was established, with a regular oil output since 1854. One of the rock oil mine owners was Polish pharmacist, Ignacy Łukasiewicz, who was the first to produce distilled kerosene from oil in 1852/1853. He also invented the kerosene lamp in 1853. The world's oldest oil mine is a registered Historic Monument of Poland.
