= Grabownica Starzeńska =

- Village
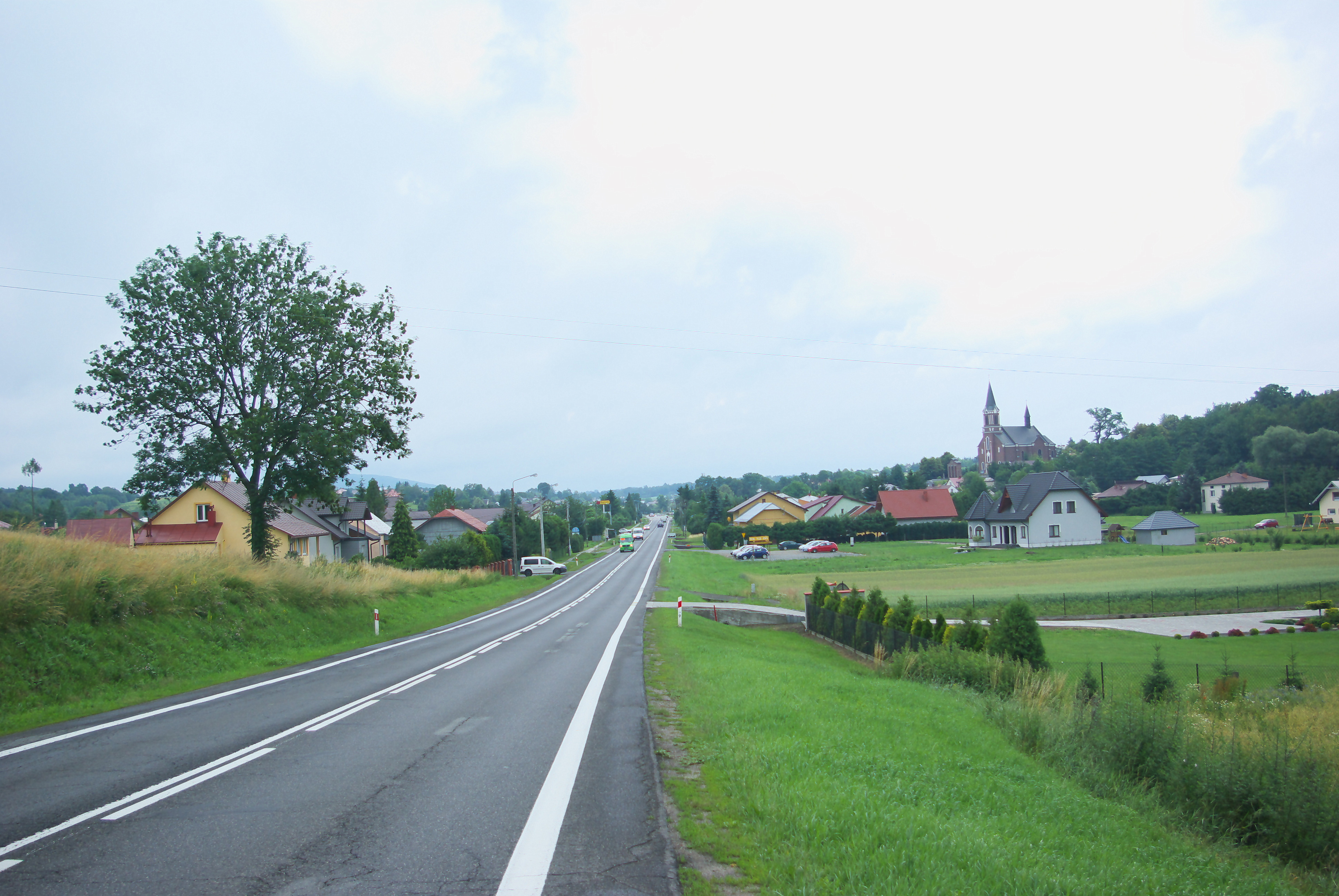
- Grabownica Starzeńska

- Location within Poland
- Coordinates: 49°40′N 22°5′E
- Country: Poland
- Voivodeship: Subcarpathian
- County: Brzozów
- Gmina: Brzozów
- Population: 3,000

Grabownica Starzeńska [ɡrabɔvˈɲit͡sa staˈʐɛɲska] is a village in the administrative district of Gmina Brzozów, within Brzozów County, Subcarpathian Voivodeship, in south-eastern Poland.

== Gallery ==
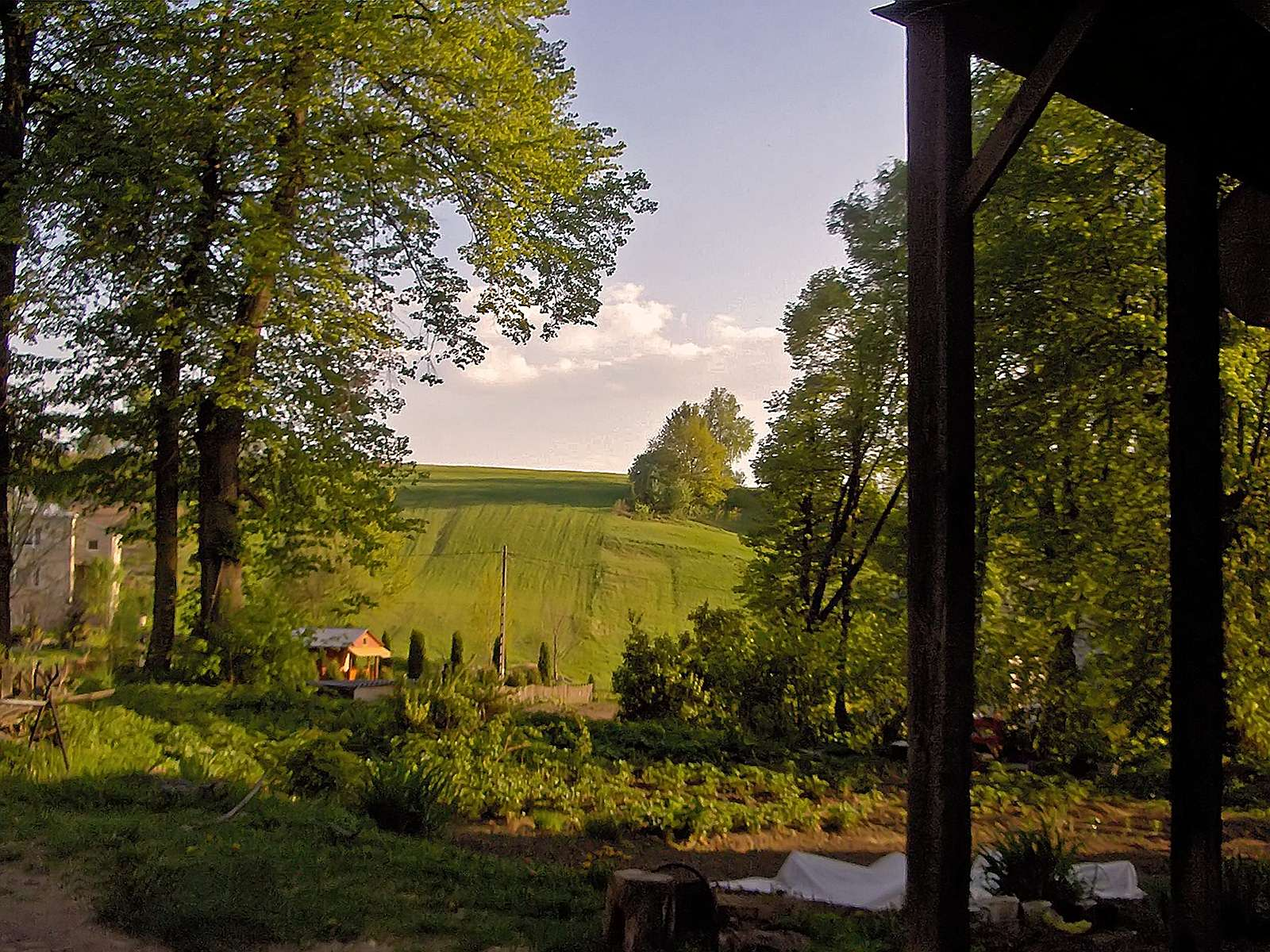
Grabownica

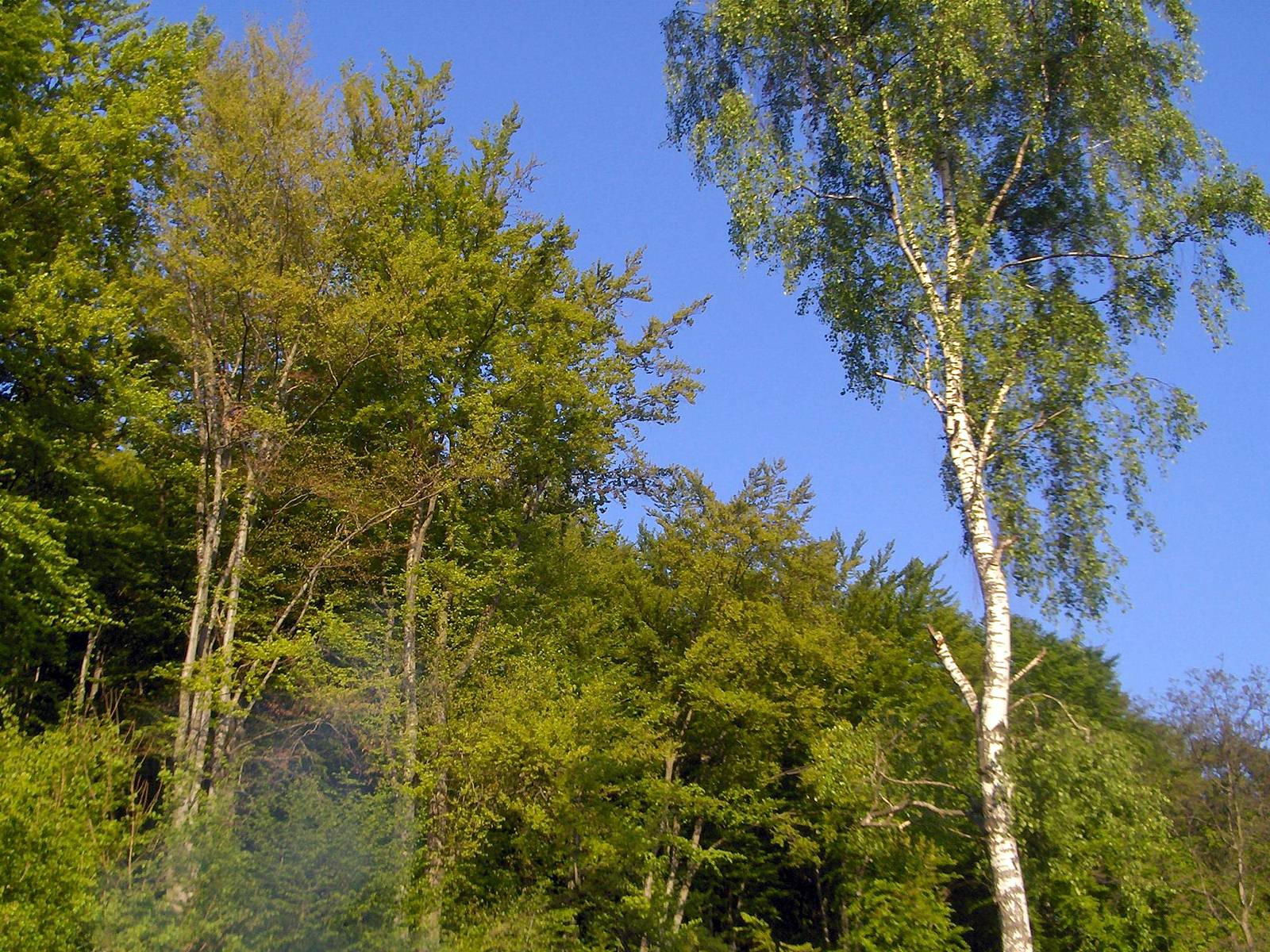
Grabownica

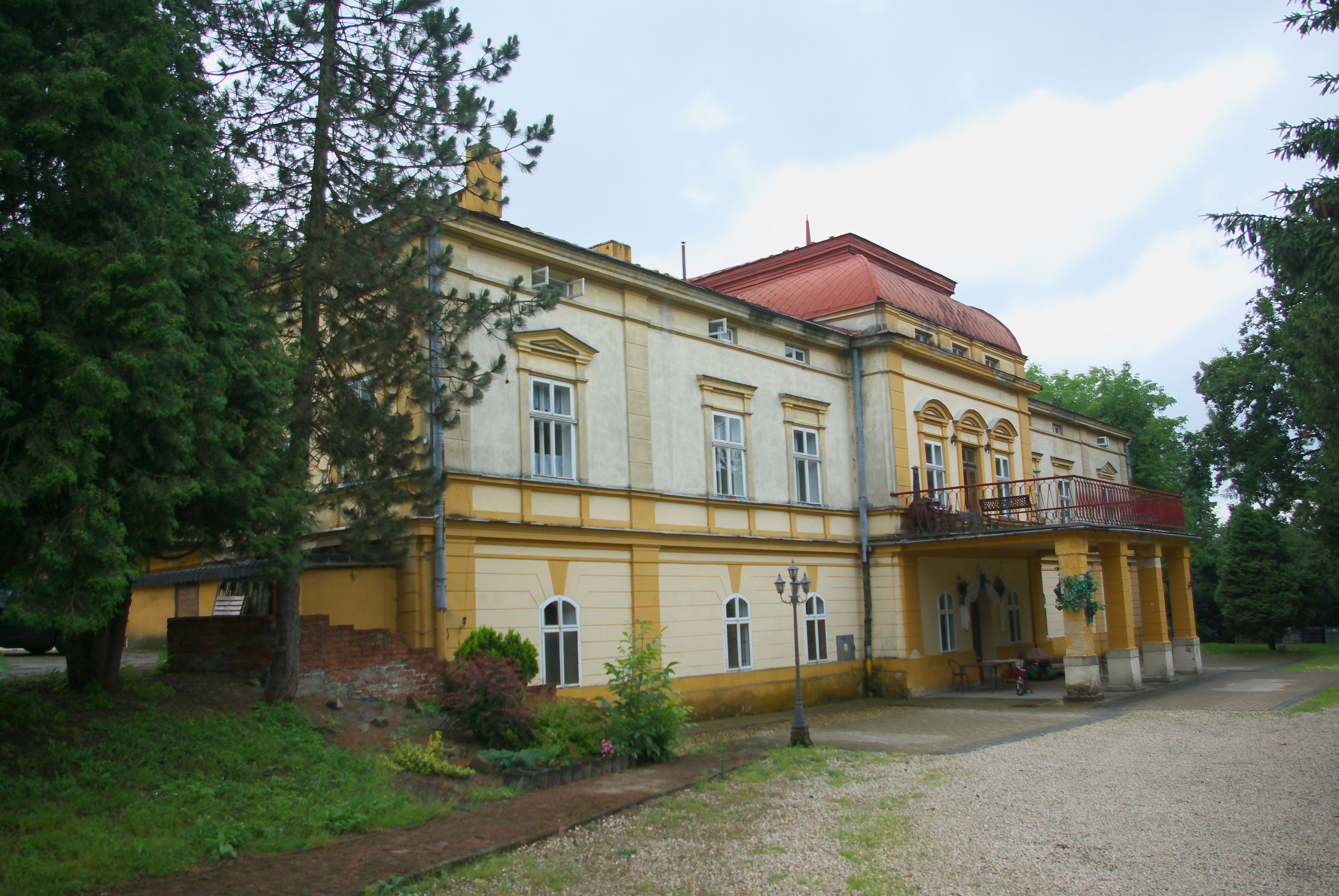
Ostaszewski Palace

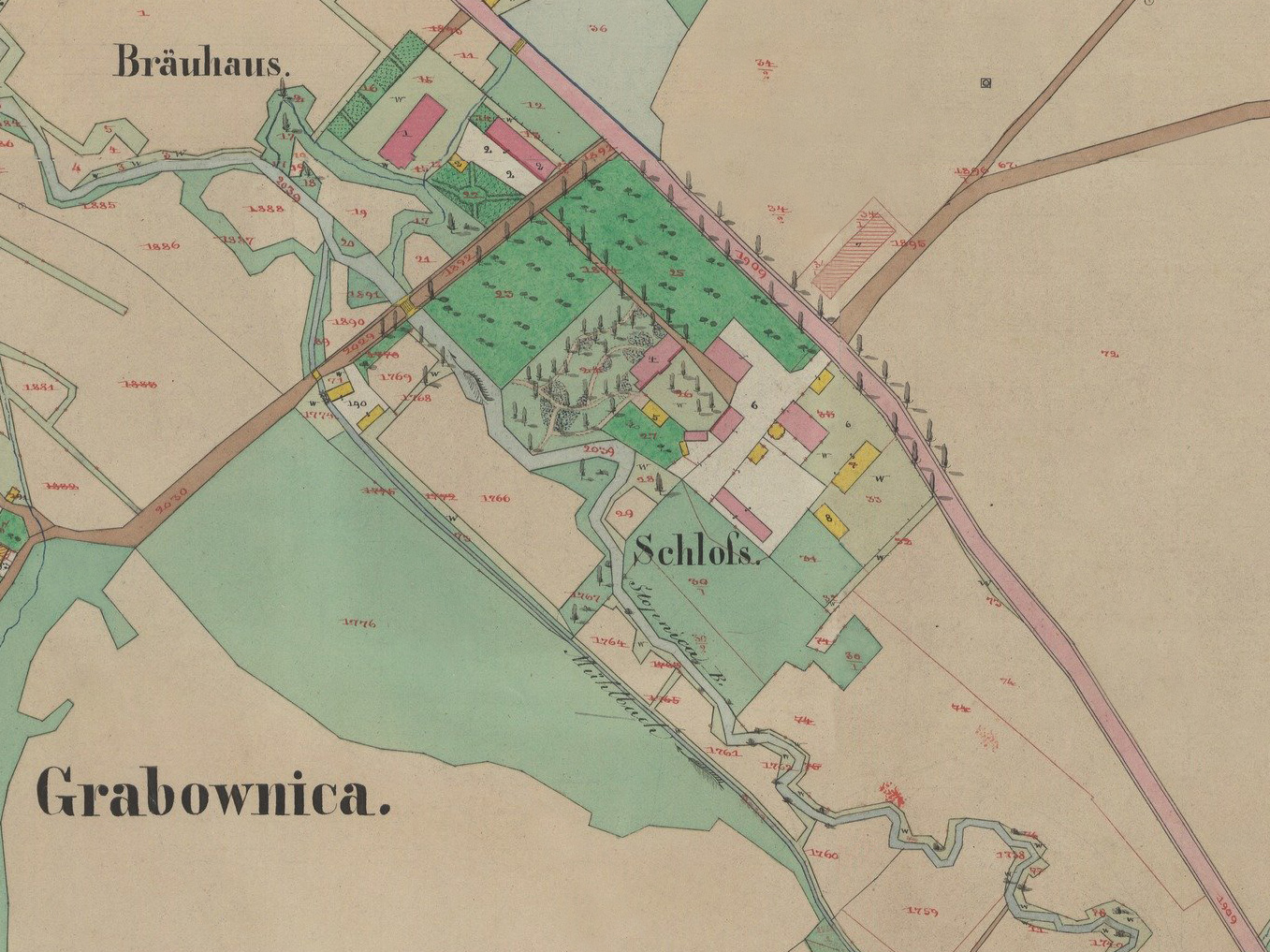
A map from 1852
