= List of dams and reservoirs in Poland =

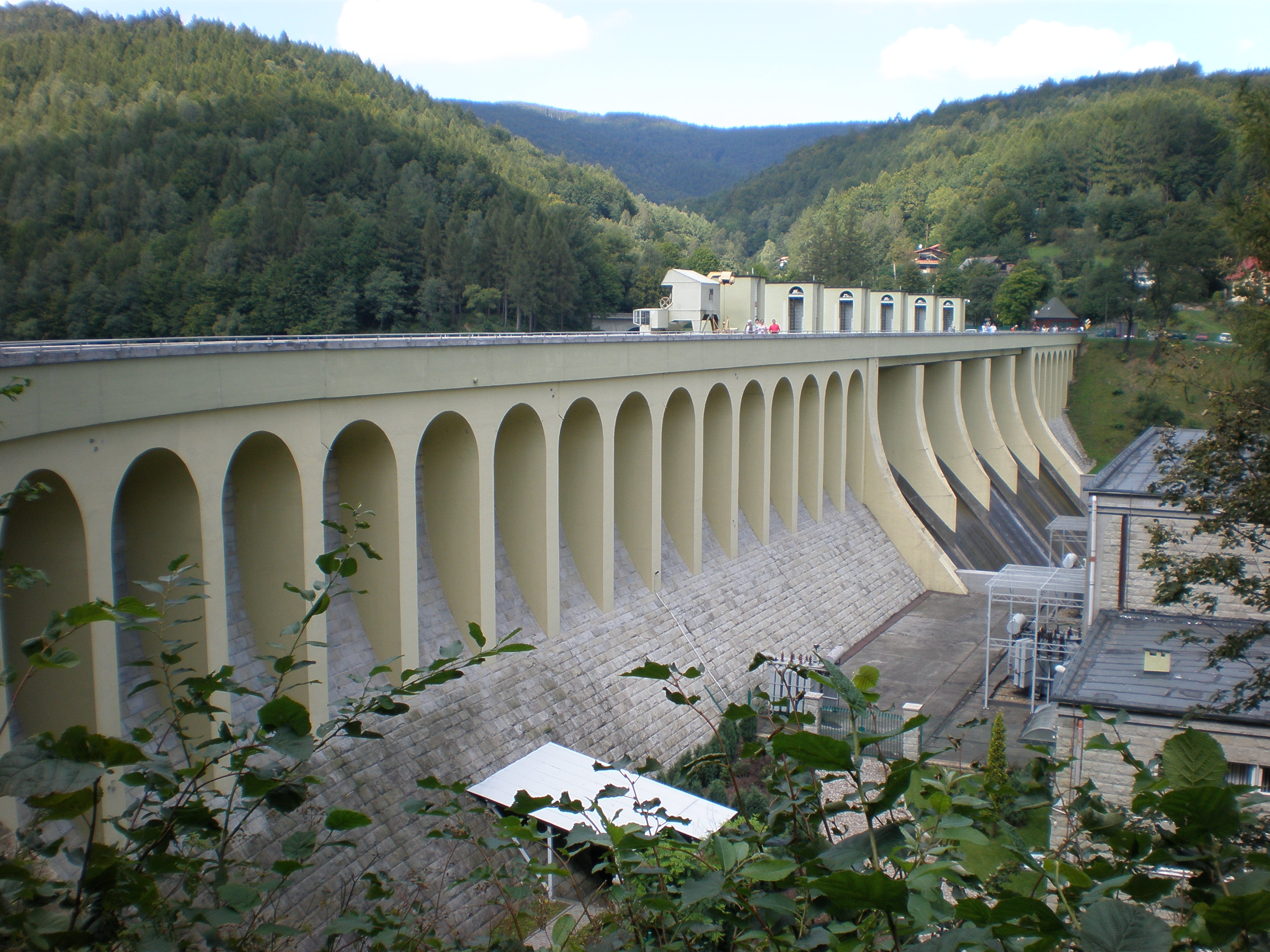
Porąbka Dam on the Soła, completed in 1937

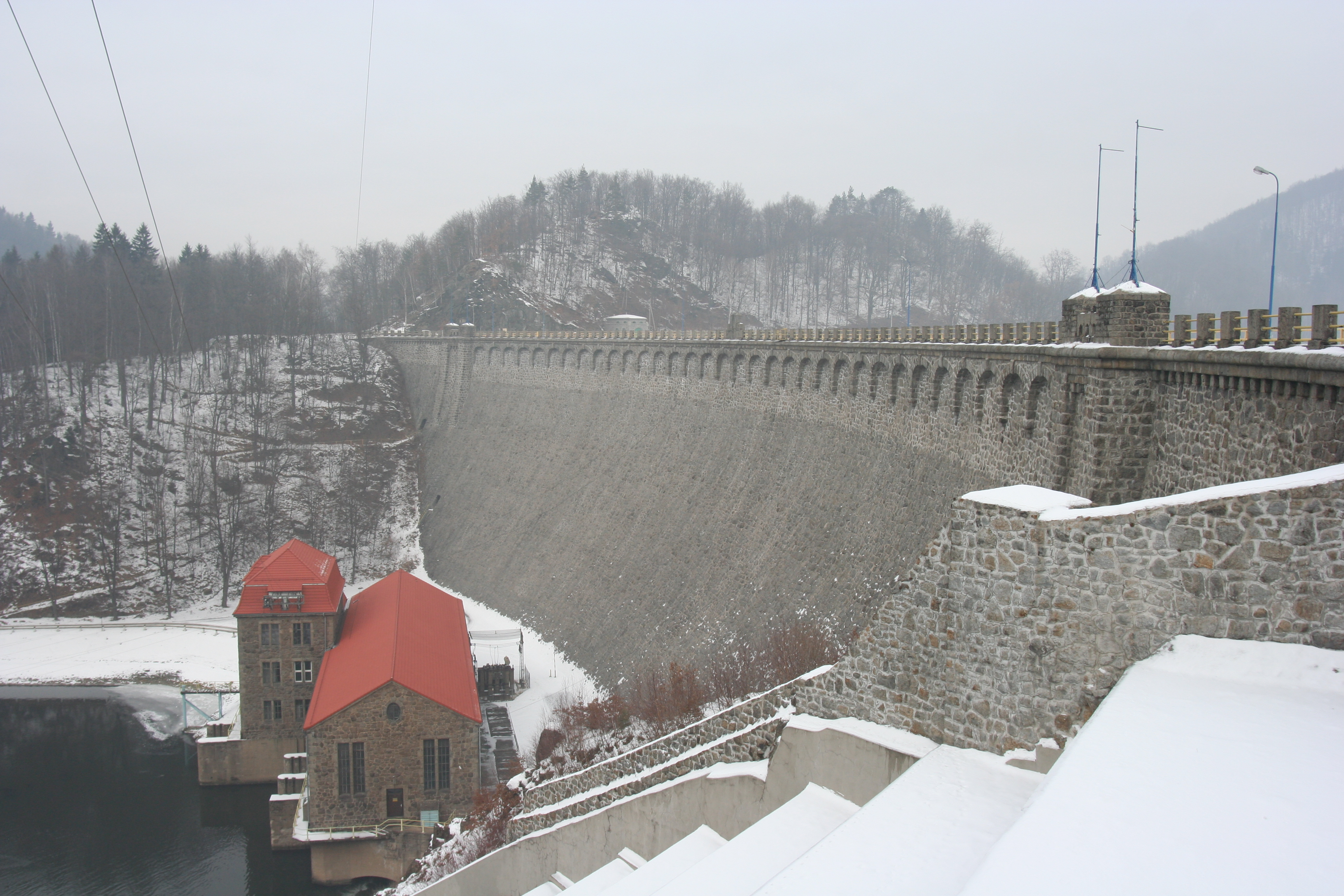
Pilchowice Dam on the Bóbr, completed in 1912

Major water reservoirs and dams in Poland:

- Besko Reservoir on the Wisłok, completed 1978
- Bukowskie Reservoir on the Bóbr, completed 1907, expanded 1989
- Lake Czorsztyn on the Dunajec, completed 1995
- Lake Dobczyce on the Raba, 1987
- Goczałkowice Reservoir on the Vistula, 1956
- Lake Klimkowskie on the Ropa, 1994
- Lake Leśnia on the Kwisa, 1905
- Lake Lubachowskie on the Bystrzyca, 1917
- Lake Malta on the Cybina, 1952
- Lake Międzybrodzkie, created by the Porąbka Dam on the Soła, 1937
- Niedów Reservoir on the Smědá, 1962
- Nyskie Lake on the Nysa Kłodzka, 1971
- Otmuchowskie Reservoir on the Nysa Kłodzka, 1933
- Pilchowickie Lake, created by the masonry gravity Pilchowice Dam on the Bóbr, 1912
- Lake Rożnów on the Dunajec, 1942
- Lake Solina, created by the concrete gravity Solina Dam on the San, 1968
- Sulejów Reservoir on the Pilica, 1974
- Włocławek Reservoir on the Vistula, 1970
- Wrzeszczyńskie Reservoir on the Bóbr, 1927
- Zegrze Reservoir on the Narew, 1963
- Złotnickie Reservoir, created by the masonry gravity Złotnickie Dam on the Kwisa, 1924
- Zygmunt August's Lake near Knyszyn, 1559 - oldest in Poland
- Żywiec Lake on the Soła, 1966
- unnamed reservoir at Świnna Poręba on the Skawa, under construction as of 2014

== See also ==
- List of reservoirs and dams
