= Energy in Poland =

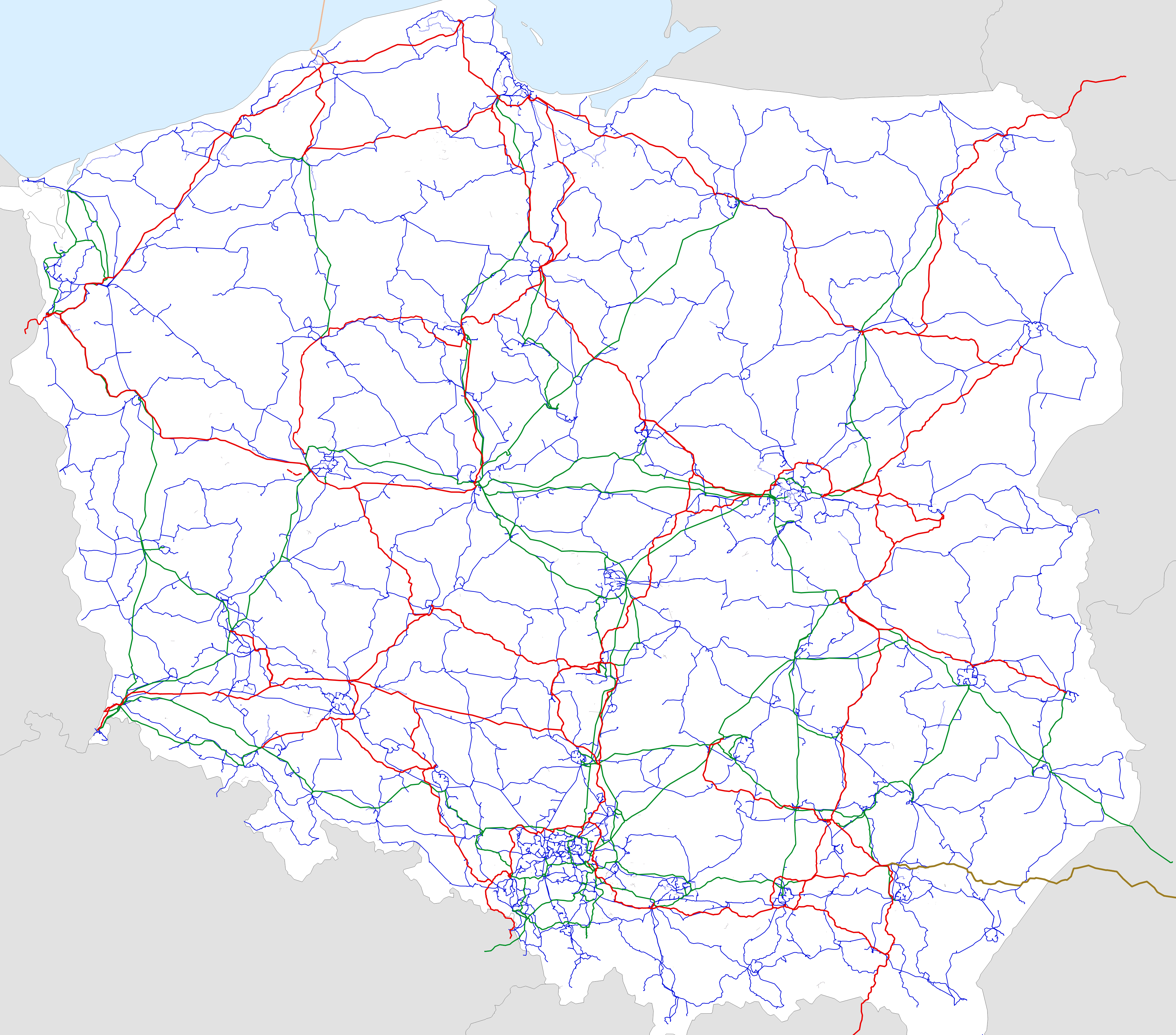
400/220/110 kV power grid lines in 2022

The Polish energy sector is the fifth largest in Europe. In recent years, Poland has been reducing its reliance on coal, increasing its wind and solar power capacity, and introducing nuclear power to diversify its energy mix and reduce carbon emissions. In 2023, solar energy expanded by 51.39%, followed by a 26.61% increase in 2024. Meanwhile, hard coal saw a significant decline, dropping by 16.96% in 2024.

In 2025, renewable energy sources generated 54.7 TWh of electricity in Poland, accounting for 31.4% of total electricity production. Renewable sources also represented 50% of installed generation capacity at the end of the year.

== Energy statistics ==
=== Electricity generation ===
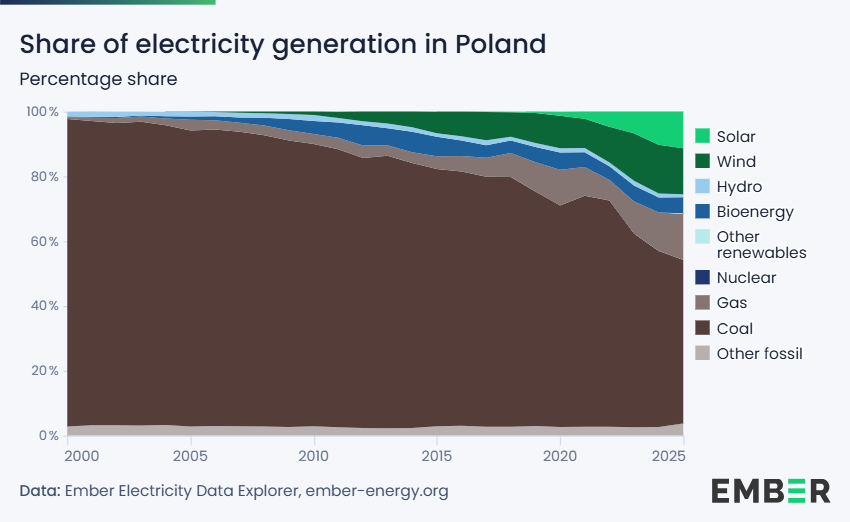
Share of electricity generation in Poland - percentage share

- Installed generation capacity: 61.092 GW
  - Renewables: 27.232 GW
    - Wind: 9.583 GW
    - Solar: 14.609 GW
    - Biomass: 0.662 GW
    - Hydropower: 2.378 GW
      - Pumped Storage: 1.589 GW
      - Water Reservoir: 0.468 GW
      - Run-of-the-river and poundage: 0.321 GW
  - Fossil: 33.860 GW
    - Coal: 26.388 GW
      - Hard coal: 18.831 GW
      - Brown coal (lignite): 7.557 GW
    - Gas: 5.162 GW
    - Oil: 0.393 GW
    - Coal-derived gas: 0.274 GW
  - Other: 1.643 GW
- Electricity consumption: 168.956 TWh
- Electricity generation: 166.990 TWh
  - Renewables: 45.2 TWh (28.8%)
    - Wind: 23.48 TWh (14.94%)
    - Solar: 17.34 TWh (11.04%)
    - Biomass: 2.36 TWh (1.5%)
    - Hydropower: 1.91 TWh (1.21%)
  - Fossil:
    - Coal: 89.06 TWh (56.68%)
      - Hard coal: 56.16 TWh (35.74%)
      - Brown coal (lignite): 32.9 TWh (20.94%)
    - Natural gas: 16.51 TWh (10.51%)
    - Oil: 2.04 TWh (1.3%)

== Sources ==
Poland's share of primary energy use by source.

=== Fossil fuels ===
==== Coal ====
In 2009 Poland produced 78 megatonnes (Mt) of hard coal and 57 Mt of brown coal. As of 2020, extraction is becoming increasingly difficult and expensive, and has become uncompetitive so reliant on government subsidies. In September 2020, the government and mining unions agreed a plan to phase out coal by 2049, with coal used in power generation falling to negligible levels in 2032.

The Bełchatów Power Station in the Łódź region supplies almost 20% of Poland's energy. It is the largest brown coal power plant in the EU, and also the single biggest source of CO_{2} emissions in the region.

In 2020, coal played a significant role in Poland's energy mix, making up 69.5% of the nation's energy production and 68.5% of its electricity generation. It accounted for 40.2% of the Total Energy Supply (TES). The largest portion of coal consumption was in electricity and heat generation, representing 75.6% of the total demand. The industrial sector followed, utilizing 14.5%, and buildings were responsible for 9.9% of coal usage.

==== Gas ====
During the April 2022 Russia–European Union gas dispute, Russia cut off natural gas deliveries to Poland after demanding to be paid in Russian rubles during currency disruptions caused by the 2022 Russian invasion of Ukraine.

In September 2022 a gas pipeline connecting Poland with Denmark, allowing gas from Norway to pass through to Poland was commissioned.

In 2020, natural gas constituted a notable component of Poland's energy mix, representing 6% of energy production and 17% of the Total Energy Supply (TES). The industrial sector emerged as the primary consumer, consuming 49% of the total natural gas. Residential buildings followed with a 23% share, co-generation processes accounted for 19%, service sector buildings utilized 7%, and the transport sector comprised the smallest share at 2%.

=== Renewable energy ===
Renewable energy as part of the energy mix
	2013	2014	2015	2016	2017	2018	2019	2020	2021	2022	2023	2024
Renewable energy share of heating and cooling sector	14.07%	14.24%	14.79%	14.92%	14.78%	21.47%	22.00%	22.14%	20.98%	22.10%	20.61%	21.22%
Renewable energy share of electricity sector	10.73%	12.36%	13.40%	13.34%	13.08%	13.03%	14.36%	16.24%	17.17%	21.01%	25.79%	30.37%
Renewable energy share of transport sector	6.03%	6.32%	5.69%	3.97%	4.23%	5.72%	6.20%	6.58%	5.67%	5.79%	6.34%	6.02%
Renewable energy share of total energy consumption	11.34%	11.60%	11.88%	11.40%	11.06%	14.94%	15.38%	16.13%	15.60%	16.64%	16.65%	17.74%

==== Biomass and waste ====
As of 2015 Biomass and waste was the largest source of renewable energy in Poland providing an estimated 8.9% of total primary energy supply (TPES) in that year and an estimated 6.1% of electricity generation. In 2019 there were 1,142 MW installed capacity power.

Solid biomass is the most important source by volume, providing fuel for heat and power plants or consumed directly for industrial or household heat requirements. Biogasses are also used in heat and power plants as well whilst waste is mainly used as a fuel in industry. In 2014 0.7 Mtoe of biofuels were used in transport, 81% as biodiesel and 19% as biogasoline, making up 5% of the total energy consumption in the transport sector in 2014.

==== Wind power ====
As of May 31, 2026, Poland had a total of 11,005.7 MW in wind power grid-connected capacity. The total wind power grid-connected capacity in Poland was 10,602 MW as of 2025. Poland's 2040 energy plan (PEP2040) forecasts that the country will install up to 20 GW of land-based grid-connected wind power.

However, a report from April 2024 highlights that Poland's integration of wind power into the national grid has encountered significant challenges. Despite ambitious plans for expansion, the practical implementation faces operational difficulties. For instance, due to favorable weather conditions leading to an electricity oversupply, wind farms with a capacity of about 1.9 gigawatts had to be shut down on a specific Sunday. This curtailment was part of a broader adjustment affecting 4.5 gigawatts of renewable energy, necessitated by low demand at the time, even though renewables were supplying over half of the national power demand, which stood at 17.7 gigawatts. This incident underscores the complex challenges of managing intermittent energy sources within a grid that still relies significantly on coal. With a current installed capacity of 10.1 gigawatts, Poland continues to navigate the intricacies of integrating a growing share of renewable energy into its power infrastructure.

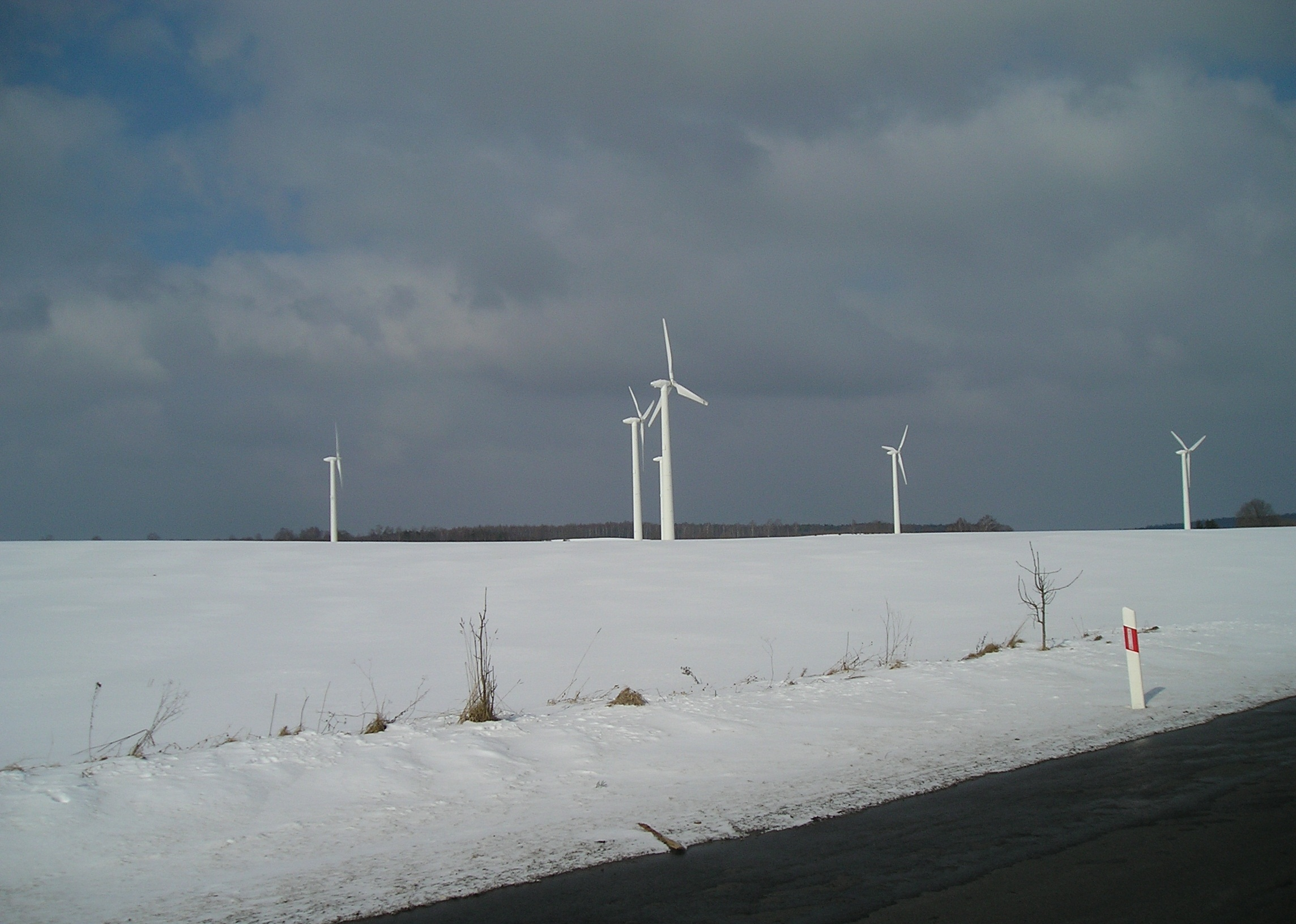
Wind turbines in Wałdowo

Offshore wind

In September 2020, the government announced a 130 billion zloty (£26.5 billion) plan to invest in offshore wind.

Poland's "Offshore Wind Act" came into force in 2020. The main purpose of the Act is to set the framework for a dedicated subsidy scheme for offshore wind projects. However, it also addresses other relevant issues pertaining to the development and operation of offshore projects.

According to Polish Wind Energy Association (PWEA), offshore wind farms in the Baltic Sea with an overall capacity of 5.9 GW are set to "receive support under a two-sided contract for difference between the investor and the regulator. Awarding support under this formula will be time-limited until the end of June 2021." In a second phase, contracts are planned to be awarded by auctions. The first is to take place in 2025. The PWEA said that support will be available for projects with a total capacity of 2.5 GW in each of the auctions. By 2050, Poland wants a massive 28 GW in offshore sector, which would make Poland the largest operator of offshore wind in the Baltic Sea.

On 1 July 2020 representatives of the Polish government and Polish wind energy industry signed a “Letter of Intent on cooperation for development of offshore wind power in Poland”. The letter acknowledges the role of offshore wind in meeting the European Union's Green Deal objectives while increasing the security of energy supply and reducing Poland's CO_{2} emissions.

In its National Energy and Climate Plan (NECP) Poland identified offshore wind as one of key technologies to meet its goals for renewable energy for 2030. Offshore wind has also been described as strategic in the draft of Poland's Energy Policy until 2040, with around 19 GW forecast to be constructed. It will help with diversifying Poland's national power generation structure that today heavily depends on coal.

==== Hydroelectric power ====
Name	Location	Coordinates	Capacity (MWe)	Type	Ref.
Żarnowiec	Pomorskie		680	pumped storage	
Żar	Śląskie		500	pumped storage	
Solina	Solina		200	pumped storage	
Włocławek	Kujawsko-Pomorskie		160	river dam	
Żydowo	Zachodniopomorskie		150	pumped storage	
Niedzica	Małopolskie		92.75	pumped storage	
Dychów	Lubuskie		90	pumped storage	
Rożnów	Małopolskie		50	run of the river	
Grajówka	Lubuskie		2.79	run of the river	
Future planned plants
Młoty (planned to be completed by 2030)	Dolnośląskie		1050	pumped storage	

A 2023 study suggested that Poland is currently only using around 15% of its total hydroelectric power capacity. Poland currently has 786 hydroelectric power plants, the vast majority of which (705) are relatively small, generating no more than 1 MW. Many of the smaller power plants are privately owned by small firms and family businesses, with the bigger ones owned by major electricity producers or the state.

==== Solar power ====
In 2019, the Polish government launched a scheme called "Mój Prąd", which is dedicated to supporting the development of prosumer energy, and specifically supporting the segment of photovoltaic (PV) micro-installations. The budget of the program is currently PLN 1.1 billion.

As a result, in recent years there has been a significant increase in power in this segment of the energy sector. The total solar photovoltaics (PV) grid-connected capacity in Poland was 26,871 MW as of 31 May 2026.

Estimates of PV in Poland (MW_{peak})
2005	2006	2007	2008	2009	2010	2011	2012	2013	2014	2015	2016	2017	2018	2019	2020	2021	2022	2023	2024	2025
0.3	0.4	0.6	1	1	1.8	1.8	3.4	4.2	29.9	110	176	270	526	1428	3656	7091	11063	15917	21721	25421

Estimates of PV in Poland (MW_{peak})

=== Nuclear power ===
Poland is planning to have its first nuclear reactor built by 2032-33.

Poland aims to integrate nuclear energy into its Energy Policy of Poland 2040, with plans to operationalize its first nuclear reactor, having a capacity of 1,250 MW by 2036, 3,750 MW by 2038, and to establish six reactors with a combined capacity of 6–9 GW by 2043. This initiative is expected to enable nuclear power to contribute up to 16% of the nation's energy generation by 2040. The Polish Nuclear Power Programme (PNPP), launched in 2014 and updated in 2020, details these objectives, including safety, decommissioning, and waste management.

=== Pumped hydro and battery storage ===
As of 2020, Poland had 1.7 GW of pumped hydro capacity and 9 MW of battery storage capacity. Those systems are mainly used for system balancing. As part of its 2040 energy plan, Poland aims to build an additional 1 GW of energy storage (which does not include any additional pumped hydro capacities).

== Energy policy ==
Poland's energy and climate policies are primarily outlined in two documents: the National Energy and Climate Plan (NECP), which is mandatory for all countries in the European Union (EU), and the country-specific Energy Policy of Poland 2040 (EPP2040). The NECP lays out the necessary policies and measures for Poland to meet its energy sector goals as established by EU directives. Meanwhile, the EPP2040 serves as the national framework for the country's energy transition, aligned with the NECP, with the aim of putting the country on a path to a zero-carbon economy.

PEP2040 is a government plan for the Polish fuel and energy sector, which envisions expanding renewables capacity, building offshore wind farms, and commissioning a nuclear power plant. The plan was adopted in February 2021, aiming to tackle climate change, energy security, and a just transition. Poland aims to build 6–9 GW of nuclear power by 2040, with the first reactor operational by 2032 or 2033.

== See also ==
- Oil industry in Poland
- Wind power in Poland
- Solar power in Poland
- Nuclear energy in Poland
- PGNiG – Polish state-controlled oil and natural gas company
- Renewable energy by country
