= Pilchowice =

Pilchowice may refer to the following places in Poland:

- Pilchowice, Lower Silesian Voivodeship (south-west Poland)
- Pilchowice, Silesian Voivodeship (south Poland)
