= Lake Solina =

Lake in Poland

Jezioro Solińskie Lake Solina
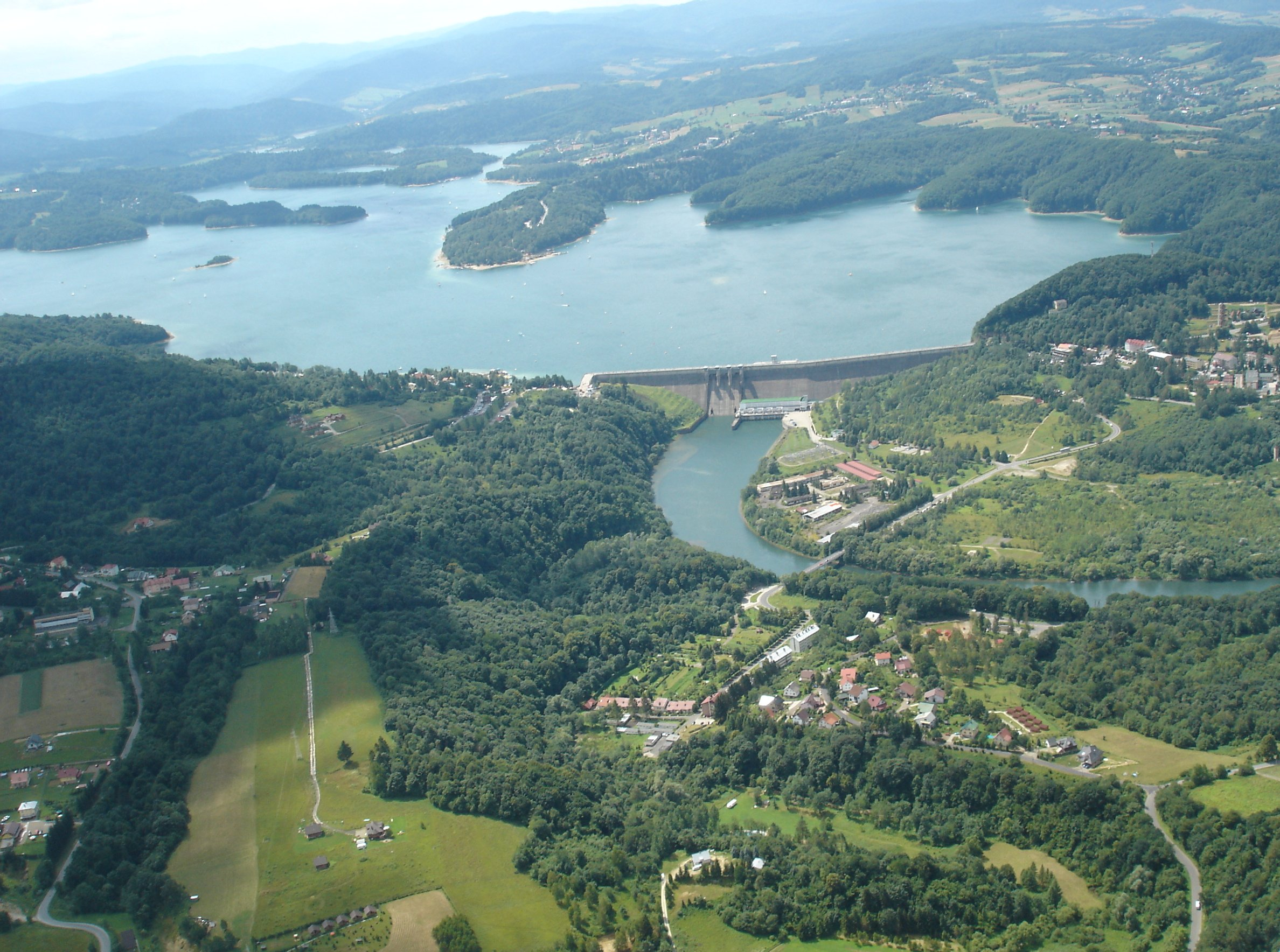
- Aerial view of the lake.

- Location within Subcarpathian Voivodeship
- Interactive map of Jezioro Solińskie; Lake Solina
- Location: Bieszczady
- Coordinates: 49°22′27″N 22°27′8″E
- Type: Artificial lake
- Primary inflows: San River and Solinka River
- Primary outflows: San River
- Basin countries: Poland
- Max. length: 21 km (13 mi)
- Surface area: 22 km^{2} (8.5 sq mi)
- Average depth: 25 m (82 ft)
- Max. depth: 60 m (200 ft)
- Water volume: 472,000,000 m^{3} (617,000,000 cu yd; 383,000 acre⋅ft)
- Shore length^{1}: 150 km (93 mi)
- Islands: 3
- Settlements: Solina, Myczkowce, Polańczyk
- ^{1} Shore length is not a well-defined measure.

Lake Solina (Polish: Jezioro Solińskie) is an artificial lake in the Bieszczady Mountains region, in Lesko County of the Subcarpathian Voivodship, Poland. Created in 1968, it is Poland's largest artificial lake as well as a major tourist attraction of the region. The Solina Dam constructed in order to create the lake is also Poland's tallest dam and is used to produce hydroelectric power.

== History ==
The first hydropower project concerning San River was designed in 1921 by Prof. Karol Pomianowski of the Warsaw University of Technology. The initial geological and hydrological works were conducted between 1936–1937; however, these plans were interrupted by the outbreak of World War II. The project was revived in 1955 and a new plan for the development of the San Valley was devised under the supervision of engineer Bolesław Kozłowski.

The first works began in 1960. Nine villages, including Solina, had to be either completely or partially submerged under water and their population had to be resettled.

The lake was ultimately created in 1968 by the construction of the Solina Dam on the San River at the cost of PLN 1.5 billion. An estimated 2,000 workers were involved in the construction of the lake.

In 1966, Polish film director, Henryk Kluba, directed the film Chudy i inni, which tells the story of the lives of workers employed during the construction of the lake. It also deals with the various controversies surrounding the project including the resettlement of the inhabintants of the villages that was needed for the construction of the lake.

== Description ==
Solina Lake is located in the Subcarpathian Voivodeship 30 km east of Sanok and covers an area of 22 square kilometres (8 sq mi). It contains 472,000,000 cubic metres (617,000,000 cu yd; 383,000 acre⋅ft) of water, making it Poland's largest artificial lake. The Solina Dam on the lake is 664 meters long and 82 meters tall, making it Poland's tallest dam. An estimated 820,000 cubic meters of cement was used for the construction of the dam, which weighs 2 million tonnes.

The lake has a very developed shoreline with numerous bays and its total length is estimated at around 150-166 km depending on the water level. The average depth of the lake is 25 meters, the deepest place being 60 meters. There are three islands located on the lake.

Below the dam, a hydroelectric power plant with the installed capacity of 200 MW is located.

The lake is rich in fish and plenty of fish species can be found in it including pike, carp, catfish, bream, roach, perch and zander.

== Tourism ==
It is the best known tourist attraction of the region, with waterside villages like Solina, Myczkowce, and Polańczyk catering to watersports enthusiasts such as sailers, winfsurfers and kitesurfers. The lake's great depth, water clarity, and mountainous scenery makes it a very popular destination. The lake is also known as the Bieszczady Sea.

Starting in the 1970s, the Wojewódzkie Przedsiębiorstwo Turystyczne (State Tourism Enterprise) "Bieszczady" purchased a number of vessels for the lake and established the lake's White Fleet. The fleet's main ships offer cruises on the lake.

In 2022, a cableway over the Solina Dam was officially opened becoming a major tourist attraction of the region. It runs from Mount Plasza to Mount Jawor over the distance of 1.5 km long.

== Gallery ==
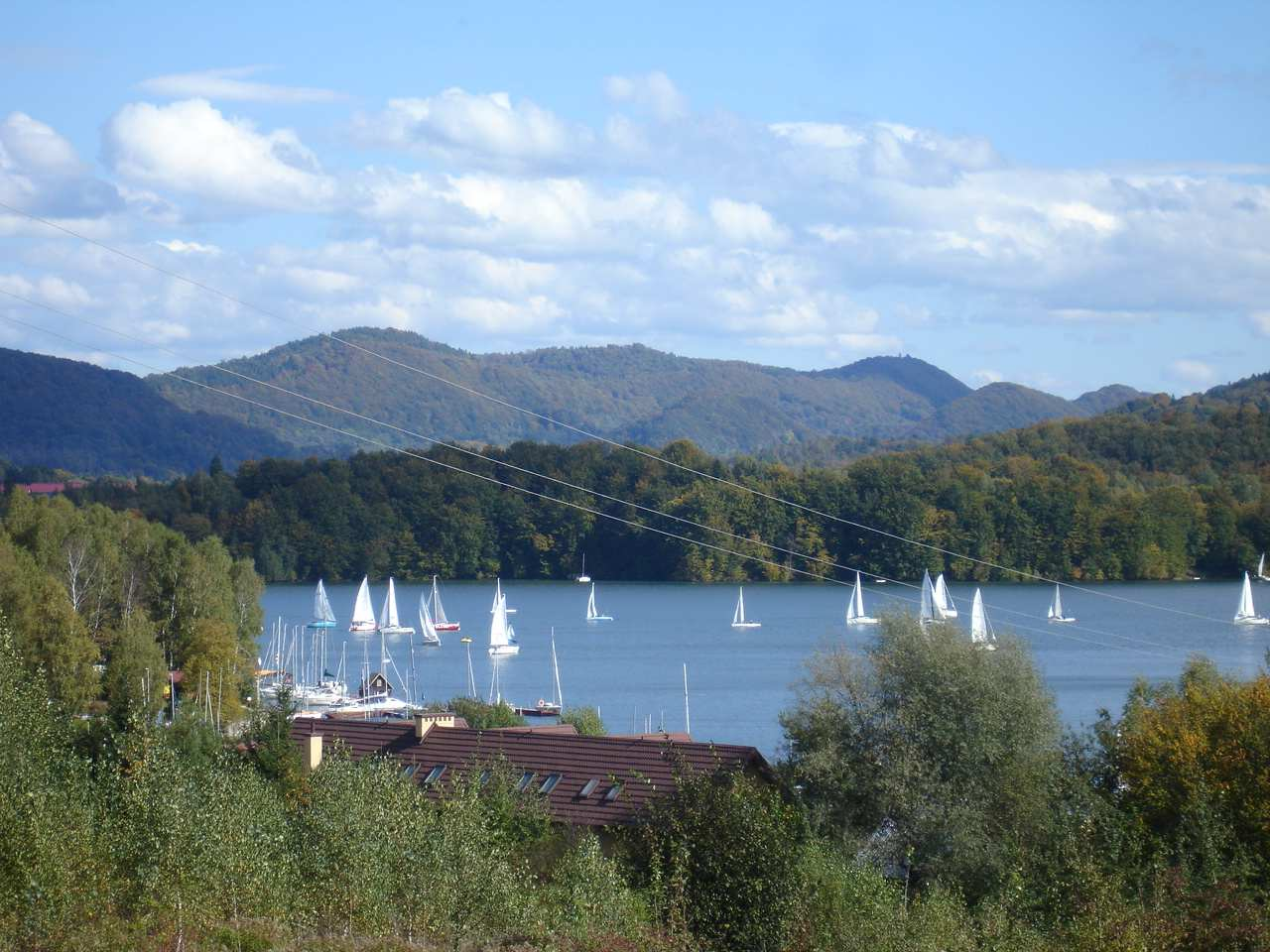
Solina Lake seen from Polańczyk.

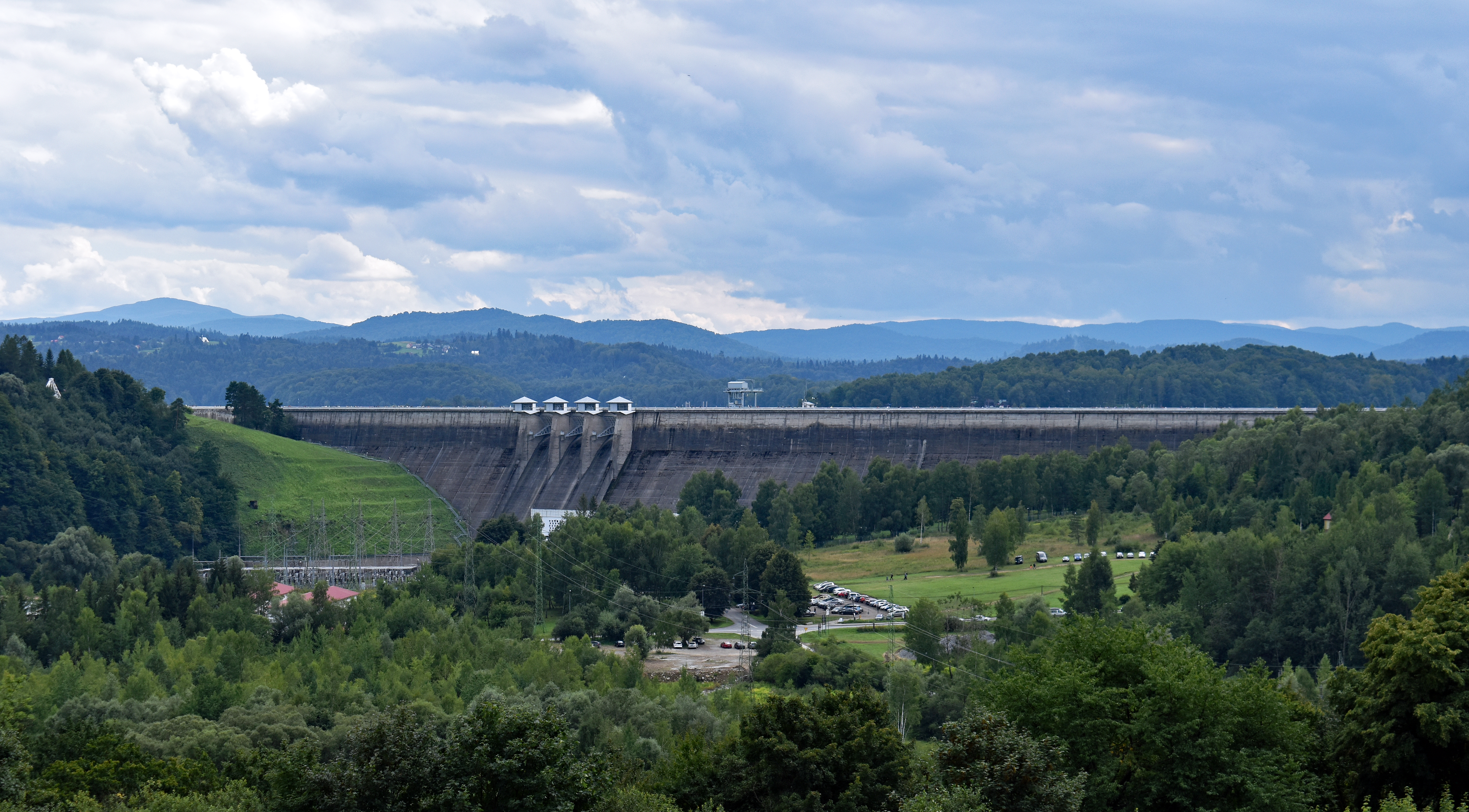
The dam view from NE.

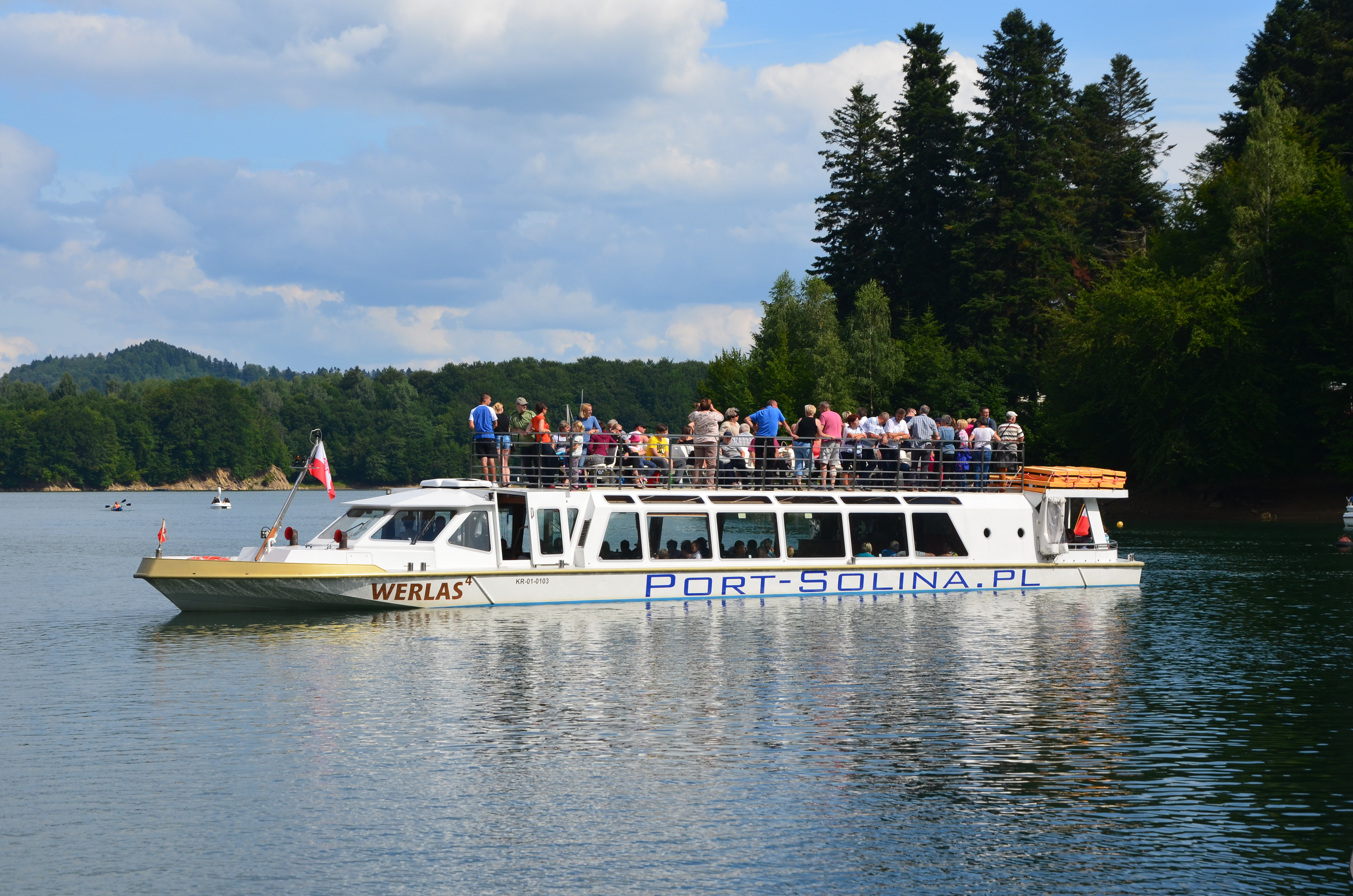
Ferryboat on the lake.

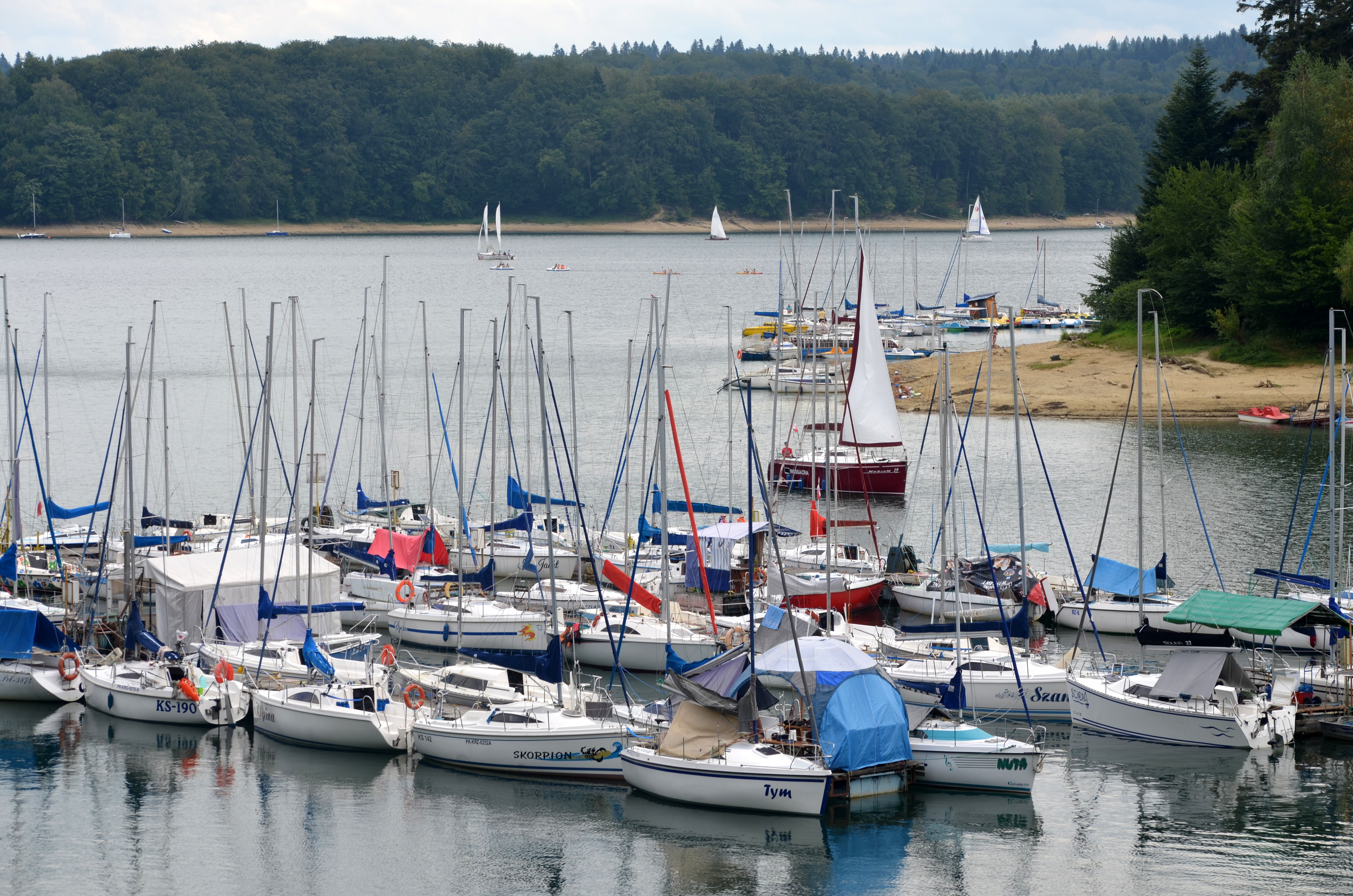
Marina on the lake.

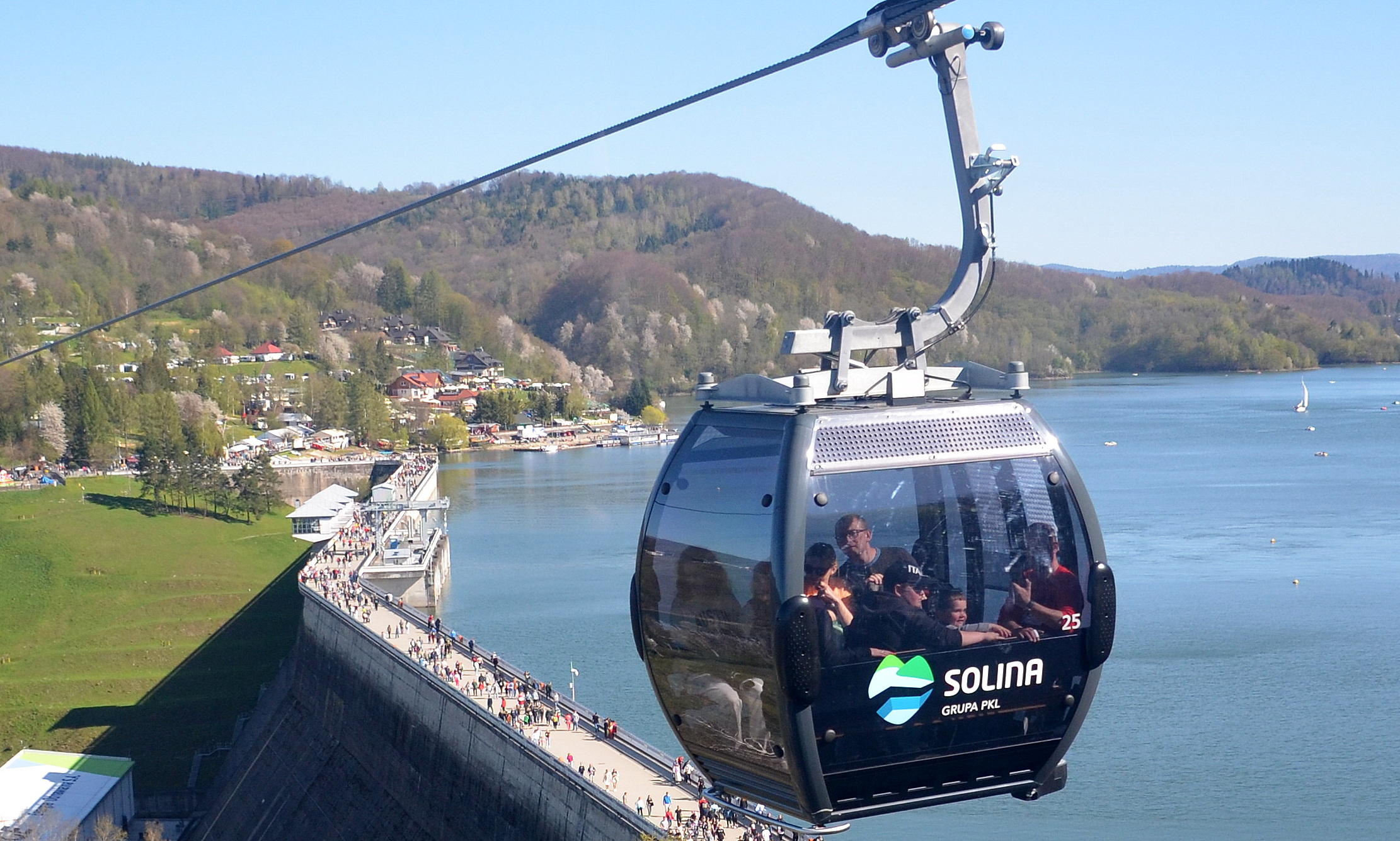
Cableway over the Solina Dam.

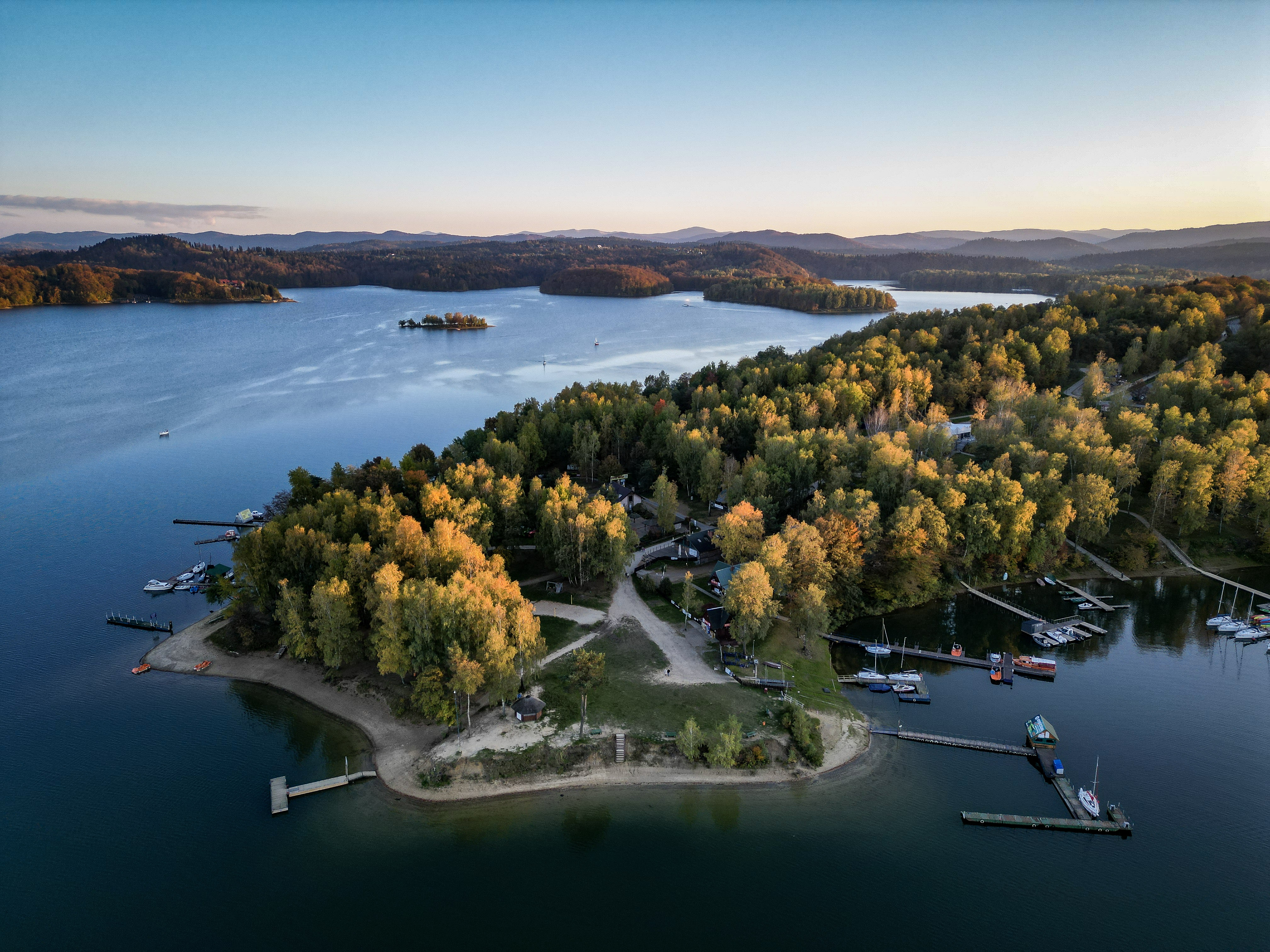
Aerial view.

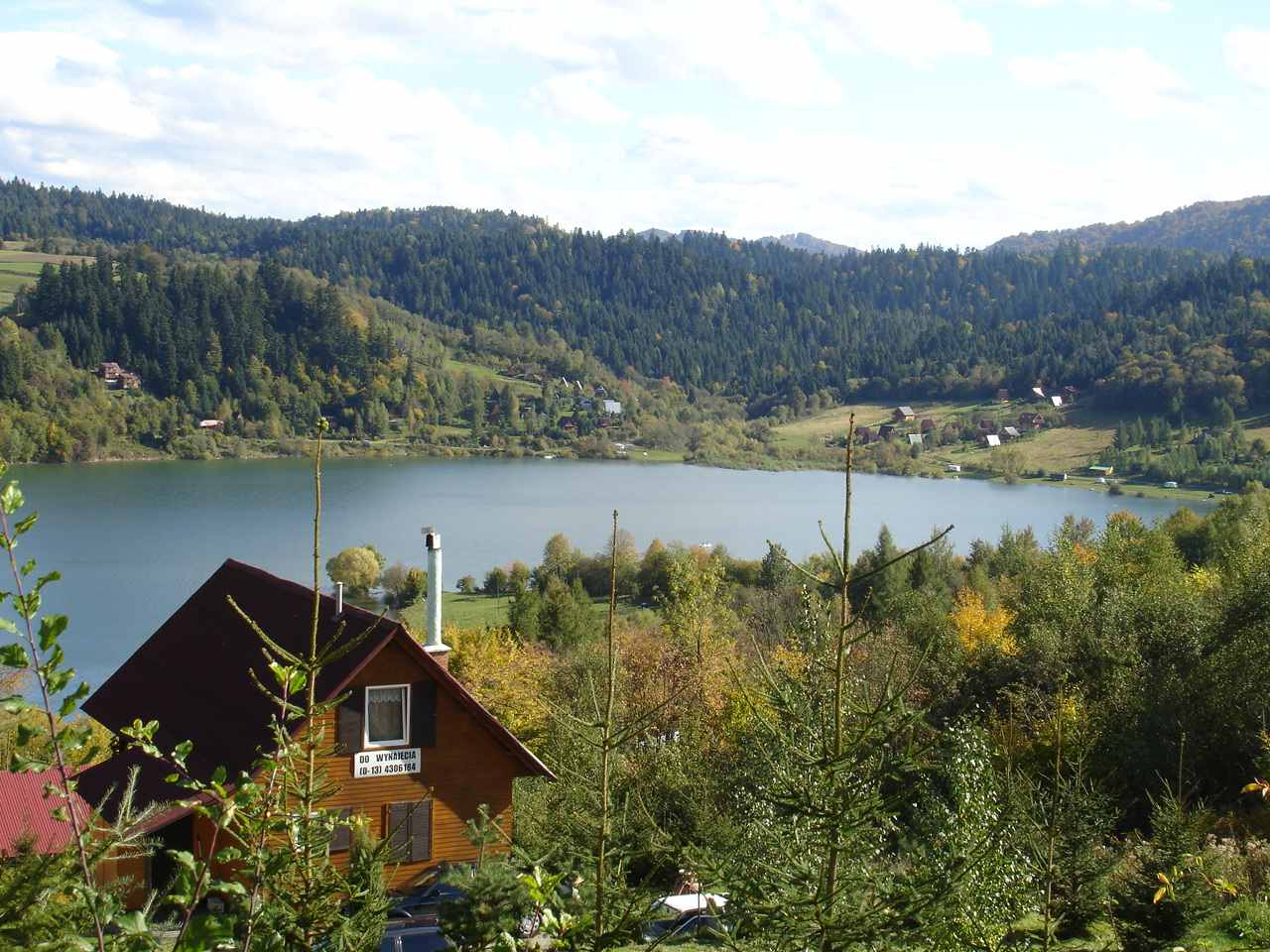
View of the lake from Wolkowyja.

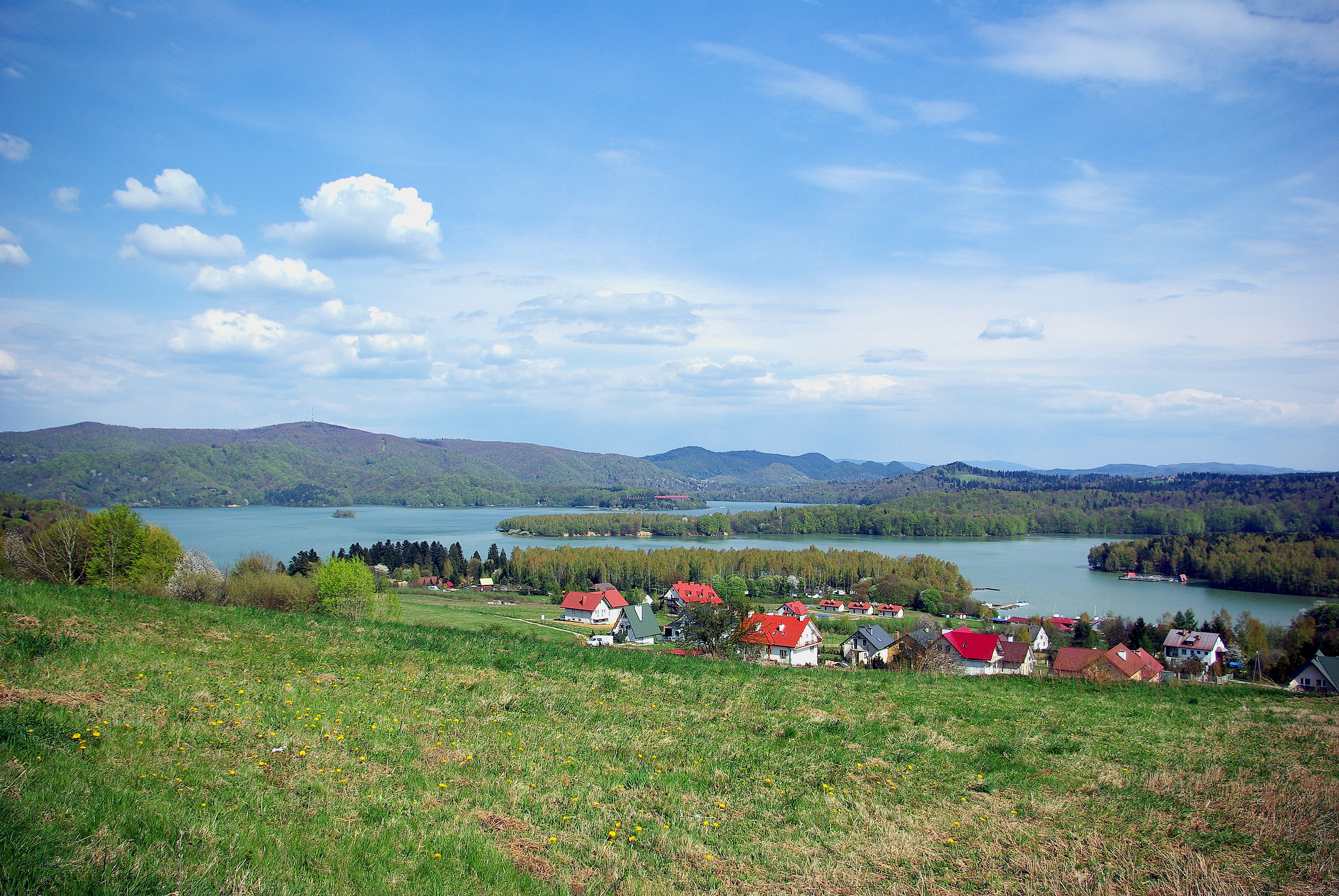
Solina Lake seen from the distance.

== See also ==
- List of dams and reservoirs in Poland
- Tourism in Poland
- Economy of Poland
