= Pilchowice Dam =

Dam in Poland

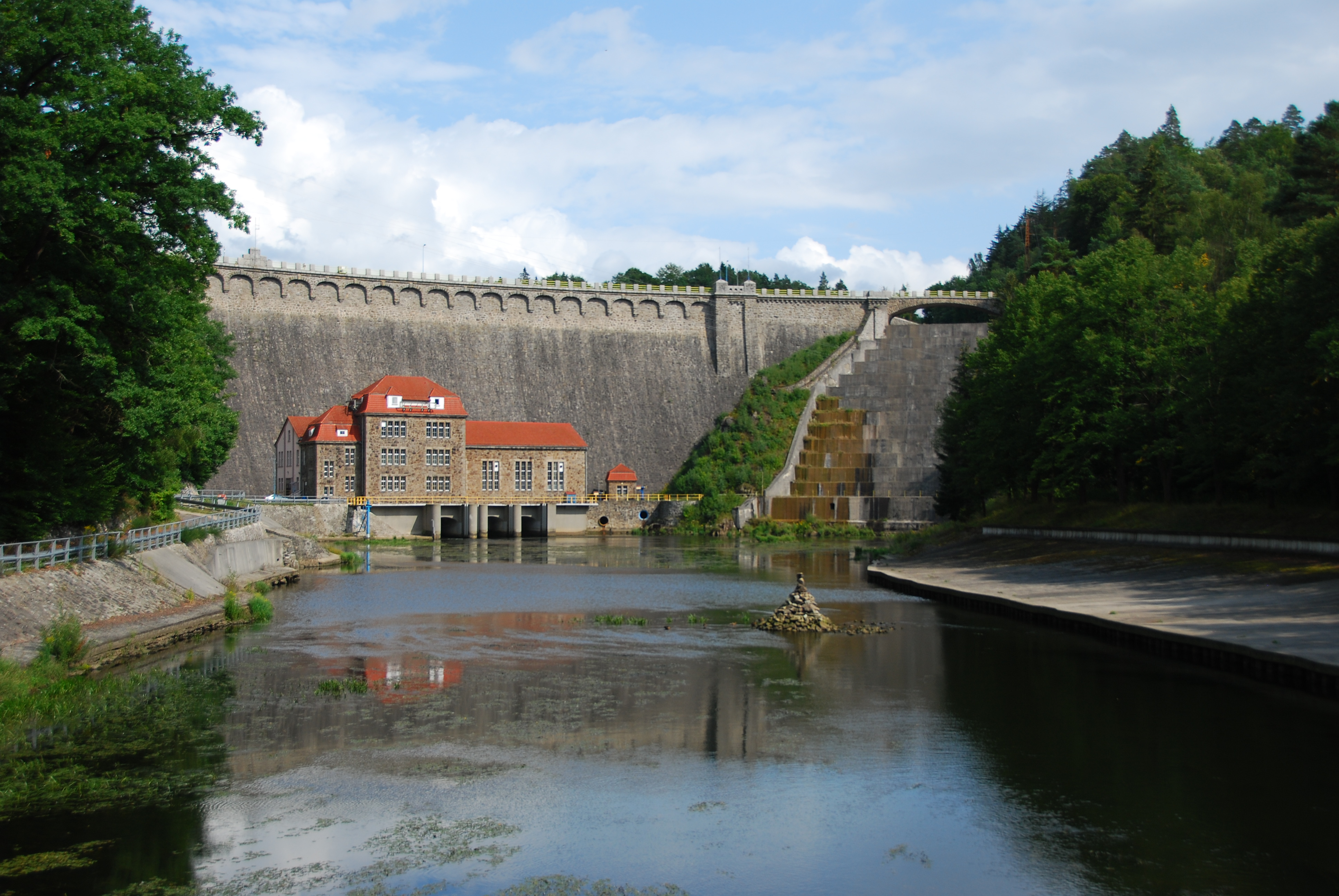
- Front view of the dam.

- Location within Poland
- Country: Poland
- Location: Pilchowice, Lower Silesian Voivodeship
- Coordinates: 50.9641°N 15.6451°E
- Status: Operational
- Construction began: 1902
- Opening date: 1912

The Pilchowice Dam (Polish: Zapora Pilchowice, German: Bobertalsperre) is the highest stone and arch dam and the second highest (after Solina), as well as the second oldest (after the dam in Leśna), hydroelectric dam in Poland, located near the village of Pilchowice, Lower Silesian Voivodeship. It was built in 1902–1912.

== History ==
It was built by the company B. Liebold & Co. AG (Holzminden/Berlin) under the direction of Alberto Cucchiero, according to the design of Professor Otto Intze and Dr. Curt Bachmann for the Prussian State Government. It is also the highest stone and arch dam in Poland today.

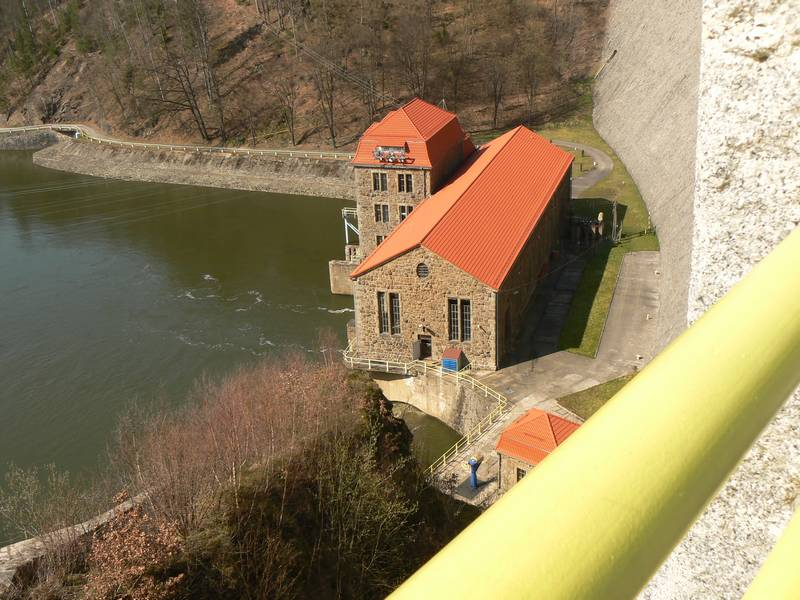
Hydroelectric power plant

The Pilchowice Dam was built on the Bóbr River between 1902 and 1912 as a protection against floods. The decision to build the dam was made on 3 July 1900, by the Prussian Parliament as a consequence of a large flood of 1897. First works started in 1902. In 1904, the excavation of a canal to carry water away from the construction site began. The canal is 9 m wide, 7 m high, and 383 m long. At a distance of 152 m from the inlet, there is a 45 m shaft with a concrete sluice used to control the water flow (the sluice is still in operation today). After the construction of the canal, baffles were created behind the canal inlet and in front of the canal outlet, thus draining and preparing the area for construction (the baffle in front of the canal inlet still exists, but it is below the water surface, providing a protective barrier against heavier pieces of rock being carried along the bottom and other items that could threaten the dam). On June 20, 1908, the ceremonial laying of the foundation stone took place. In 1906, 1908 and 1909, surging waters flooded the foundation pit.

The dam and the nearby bridge were built between 1905 and 1906 as part of a single investment along with the construction of the Jelenia Góra-Żagań railroad (Kolej Doliny Bobru), which had been under construction since 1902, as the dam was intended to have a flood control, power supply and tourist function, and the railroad with a bridge over it was to provide access to the dam. The dam is 62 m high and 290 m long at the top and 140 m long at the foot. The thickness of its wall at the base is 50 m, and at the top - 7 m, making it the largest stone and concrete dam in Europe at the time of its commissioning. The area of the created reservoir (Jezioro Pilchowickie) was 240 ha, its depth at the dam is 46 m and its volume is 50 million m³.

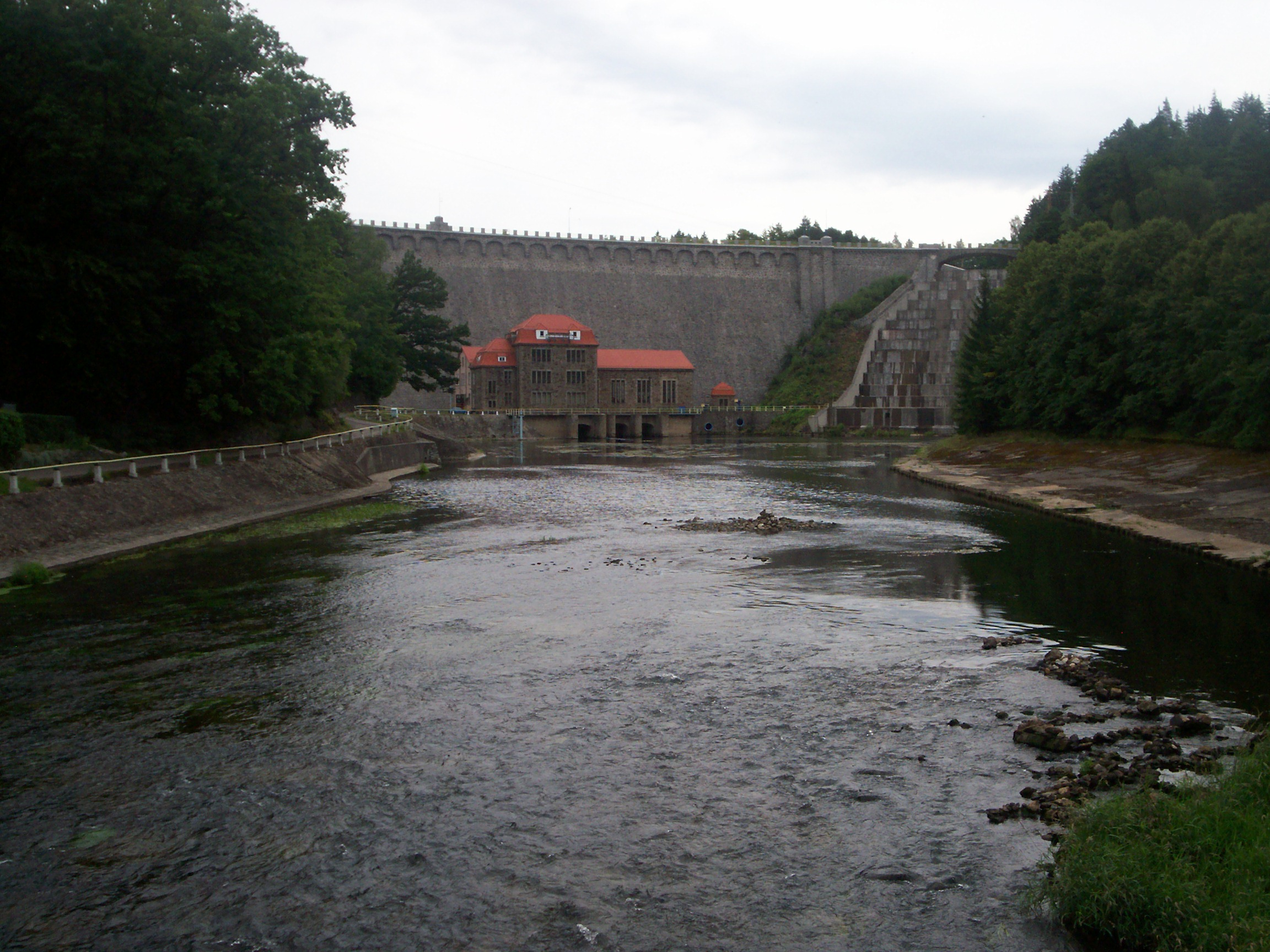
Hydroelectric power plant and dam

The bridge was officially opened on 16 November 1912 in the presence of Wilhelm II.

Since the dam was put into operation, floods in the Bóbr valley occurred only in 1915, 1926, 1930, 1938, 1958, 1997 and 2024. A power plant equipped with Francis and Kaplan system water turbines and generators was built on the dam. Initially, the powerhouse had five sets of turbines, and since the 1920s, there have been six. After the last upgrade in 2013, the capacity of the power plant was increased from 7.5 to 13.364 MW through the use of new turbine sets.

The Pilchowice Dam and its surroundings were recreated in the game The Vanishing of Ethan Carter. This area, along with other elements taken from other regions of Poland, became the setting for the game.
