= Solina Dam =

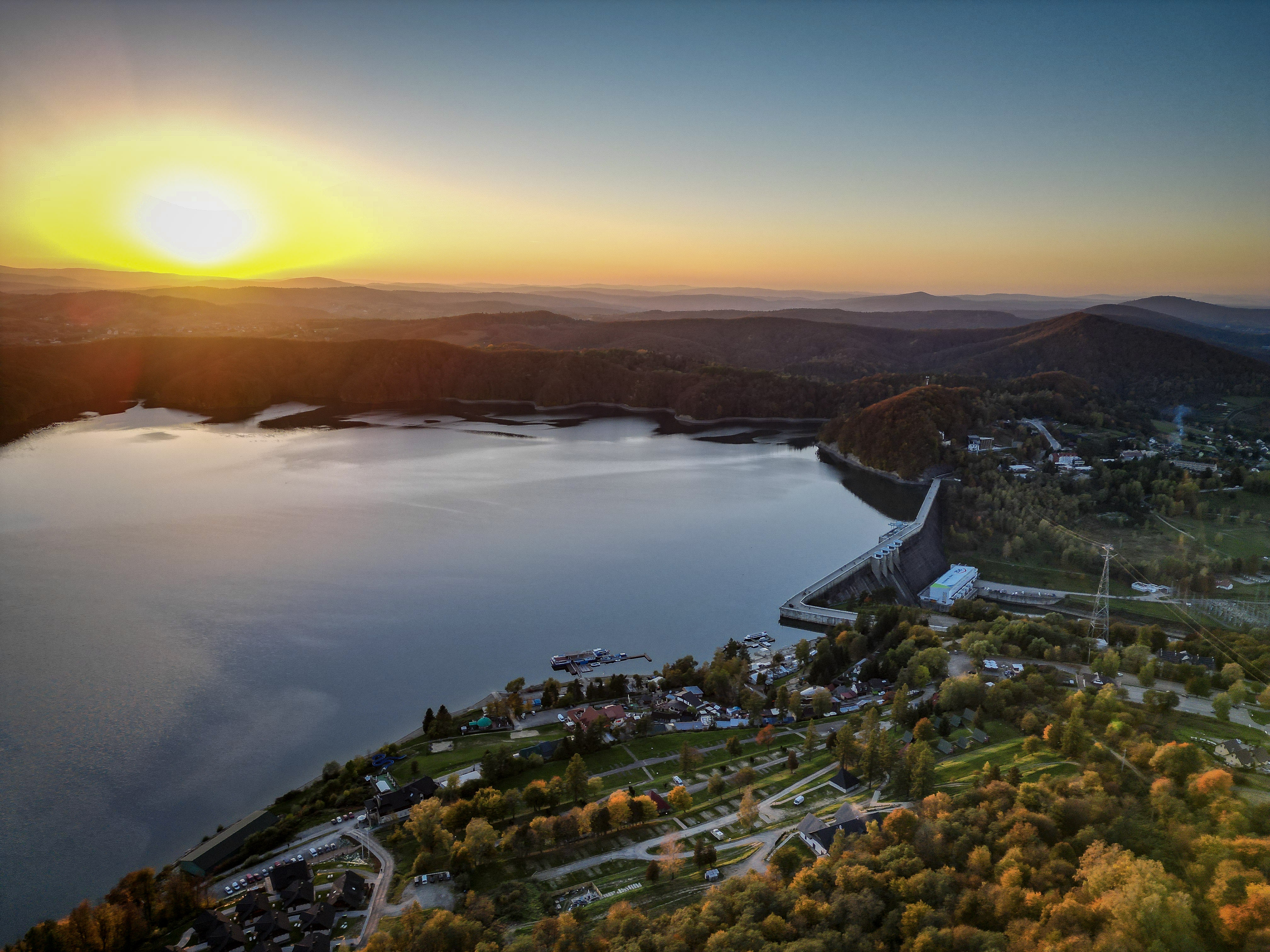
- Aerial view of the dam

- Location within Poland
- Country: Poland
- Location: Solina
- Coordinates: 49°23′44.03″N 22°27′11.65″E
- Purpose: Power
- Status: Operational
- Construction began: 1960
- Opening date: 1969

Dam and spillways
- Type of dam: Gravity
- Height: 81.8 m (268 ft)
- Length: 664.8 m (2,181 ft)
- Width (crest): 8.8 m (29 ft)
- Dam volume: 760,000 m^{3} (990,000 cu yd)

Reservoir
- Creates: Lake Solina
- Total capacity: 472,000,000 m^{3} (383,000 acre⋅ft)
- Surface area: 22 km^{2} (8.5 mi^{2})

Power Station
- Commission date: 1968
- Hydraulic head: 60 m (200 ft)
- Turbines: 2 x 73 MW Francis-type, 2 x 27 MW reversible Francis turbines
- Installed capacity: 200 MW

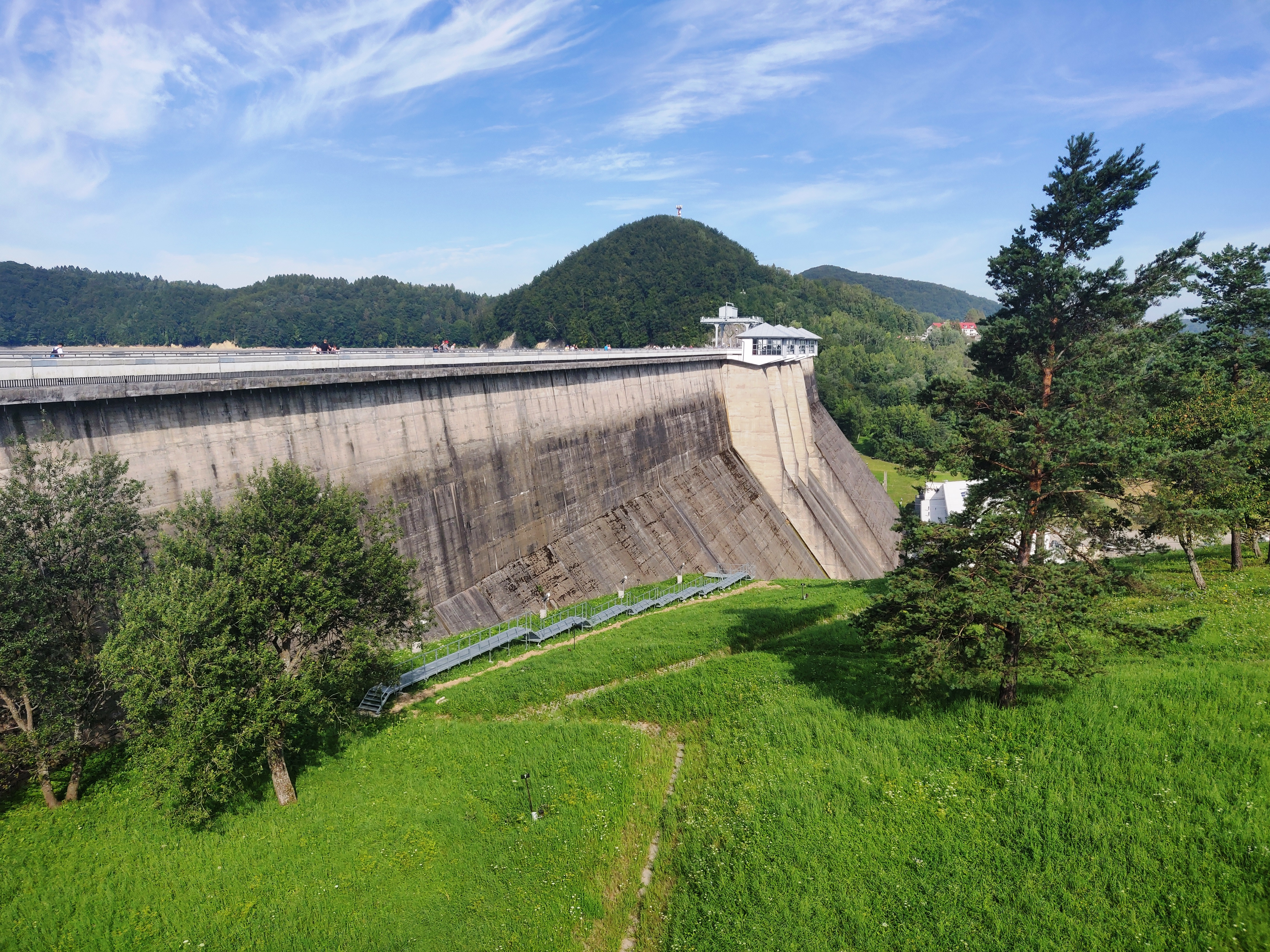
The Solina Dam

The Solina Dam (Polish: Zapora Solińska) is a concrete gravity dam in south-eastern Poland. It is the largest dam in the country. It is located in Solina of Lesko County in the Bieszczady Mountains area of Poland. With the completion of the dam in 1968, Lake Solina, the largest artificial lake in Poland, was created.

== History ==
The San river which runs through the area has a large flood plain and a series of floods prompted the consideration of a dam to regulate the water flow. The first plans for a dam in the region came in 1921 and called for a small dam in Myczkowce. The project was slow to begin and with the start of World War II it was put on hold. After the war ended the plans were revised and now included a larger dam in Solina. Various work began in 1953 and the smaller Myczkowce Dam downstream, which would become a supporting dam, was completed in the years 1956-1960. In 1960 work began based on a design by Feliks Niczke of Energoprojekt Warszawa. The construction was completed in 1968 and cost 1.5 billion of 1968 zlotys. 57 km (35 mi) of roads were also constructed as part of the project.

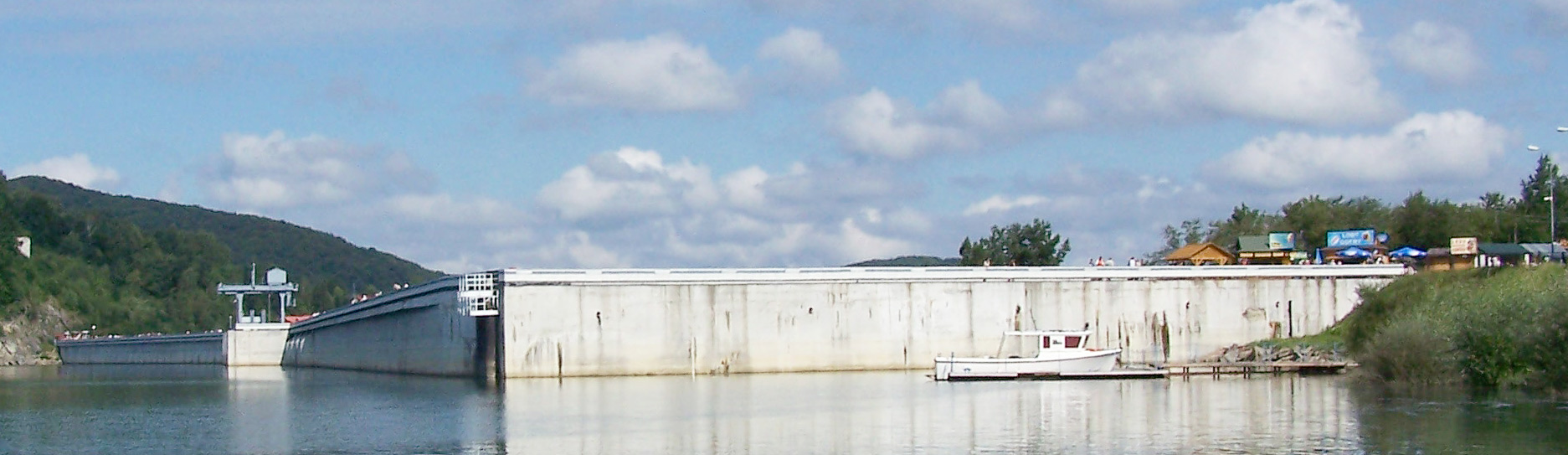
The dam.

== The dam ==
The dam is 664 m (2,178 ft) long, 8.8 m (29 ft) wide at the crest, and 81.8 m (268 ft) high. An estimated 820,000 cubic meters of cement was used for the construction of the dam, which weighs 2 million tonnes. Its construction created the largest artificial lake in Poland – Lake Solina. It has four turbines which were initially capable of generating 136 MW of electricity. As a pumped-storage power station, two of the turbines can also reverse flow and send water from the Myczkowce Dam's reservoir back into the Lake Solina for use during peak periods, optimizing power generation. Starting in 1995 efforts have been made to modernize the power plant. The installation of new technologies between 2000 and 2003 and the replacement of the old turbines resulted in the dam currently generating 200 MW of electricity as opposed to 173 MW previously.

The Solina dam is an important tourist attraction of the area. Tours are available and the dam serves as a bridge to the Lake Solina marina.

== See also ==
- List of dams and reservoirs in Poland
- Renewable energy in Poland
