= Solina, Poland =

Solina
- Village
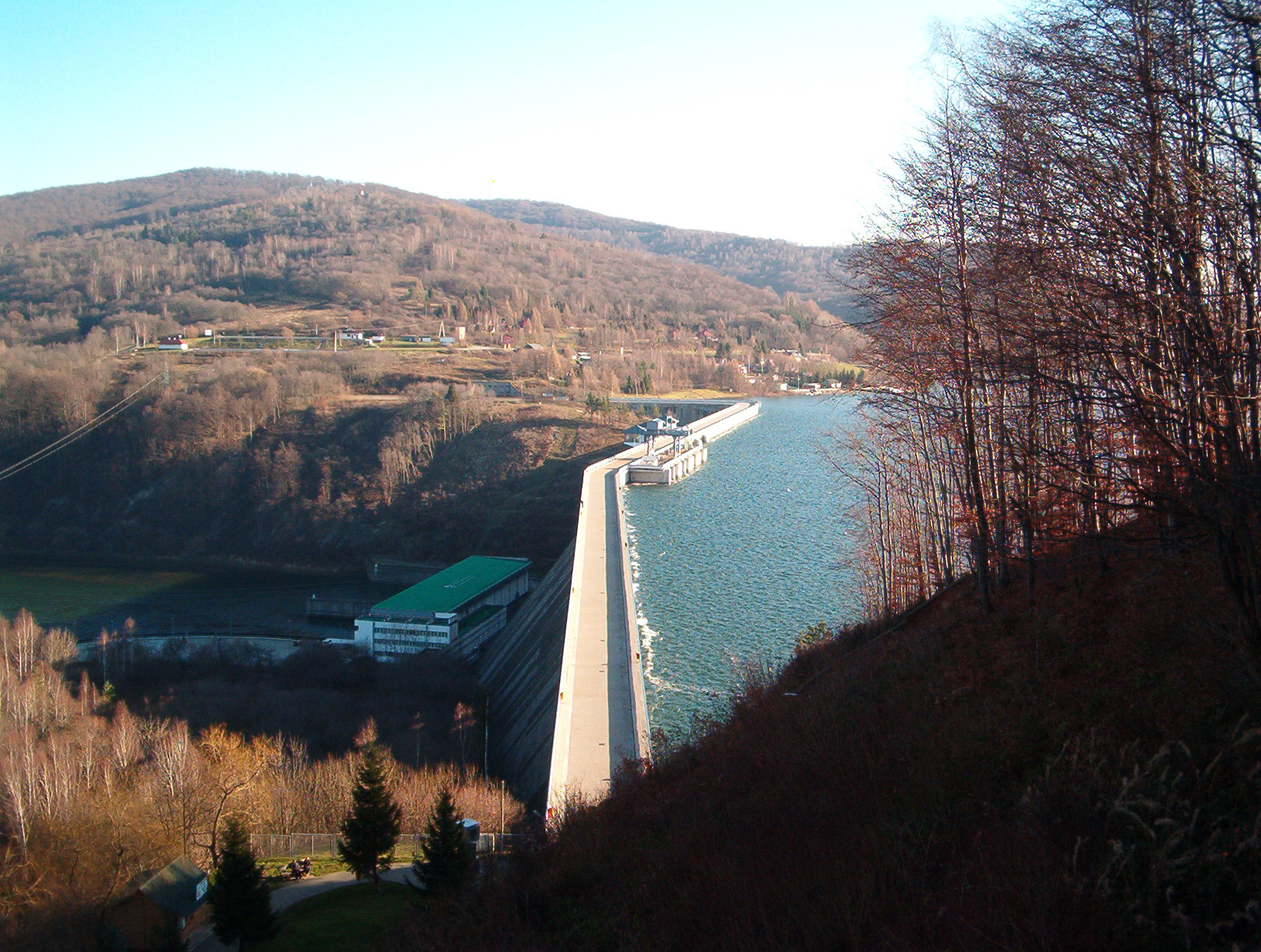
- Solina Dam from above

- Location within Poland
- Coordinates: 49°23′N 22°28′E
- Country: Poland
- Voivodeship: Subcarpathian
- County: Lesko
- Gmina: Solina
- Elevation: 482 m (1,581 ft)
- Population: 190
- Website: http://www.solina.pl

Solina [sɔˈlʲina] is a village in Lesko County, Subcarpathian Voivodeship, in south-eastern Poland. It is the former seat of the gmina (administrative district) called Gmina Solina (in 1999 Polańczyk became the new seat). In 2002 the village had a population of 190.

It is best known for the tallest water dam in Poland, the Solina Dam, which creates the biggest artificial lake in Poland, Lake Solina. There is no industry left after the liquidation of the Hydrobudowa site near the dam. Main employer is PGE, owning the hydroelectric plant in Solina. Local people highly depend on tourist income in the summer by renting rooms, running restaurants and bars and selling souvenirs. On the east side of the dam there are a lot of attractions open during summer, such as water sport equipment rental, a port with tourist ships, amusement park, disco and beach. Clean air and natural scenery are all around, bringing many visitors in the summer. The few hotels of various standards and local B&B's often are fully booked.

== History ==
The name of the village comes from the Solinka river that was meeting the San river in the village before the creation of the lake. The original Solina village was located up the San river but due to the Solina lake creation it lies under water now. Today's Solina was created along with the water dam on the grounds of the small village of Zabrodzie.

The original Solina village was one of the oldest villages in the Bieszczady mountains. It was first mentioned in 1436 as a village owned by the family of Kmits from Sobien. At the end of the 15th century it was subject to the Wallachian law again. There were three main ethnic groups living in the village until World War II: Boyko (Ukrainians), Jews and Poles.

During the Holocaust most Jews were taken away to concentration camps by Nazi Germans occupying Poland. Another ethnic group of Boyko were forced by the communist government to move to the Soviet Union or west of Poland during the Operation Vistula.

The Polish people that were left were moved in 1960 to the village of Berezka because of the Solina Dam creation.
