= Pilchowice, Lower Silesian Voivodeship =

Pilchowice
- Village=
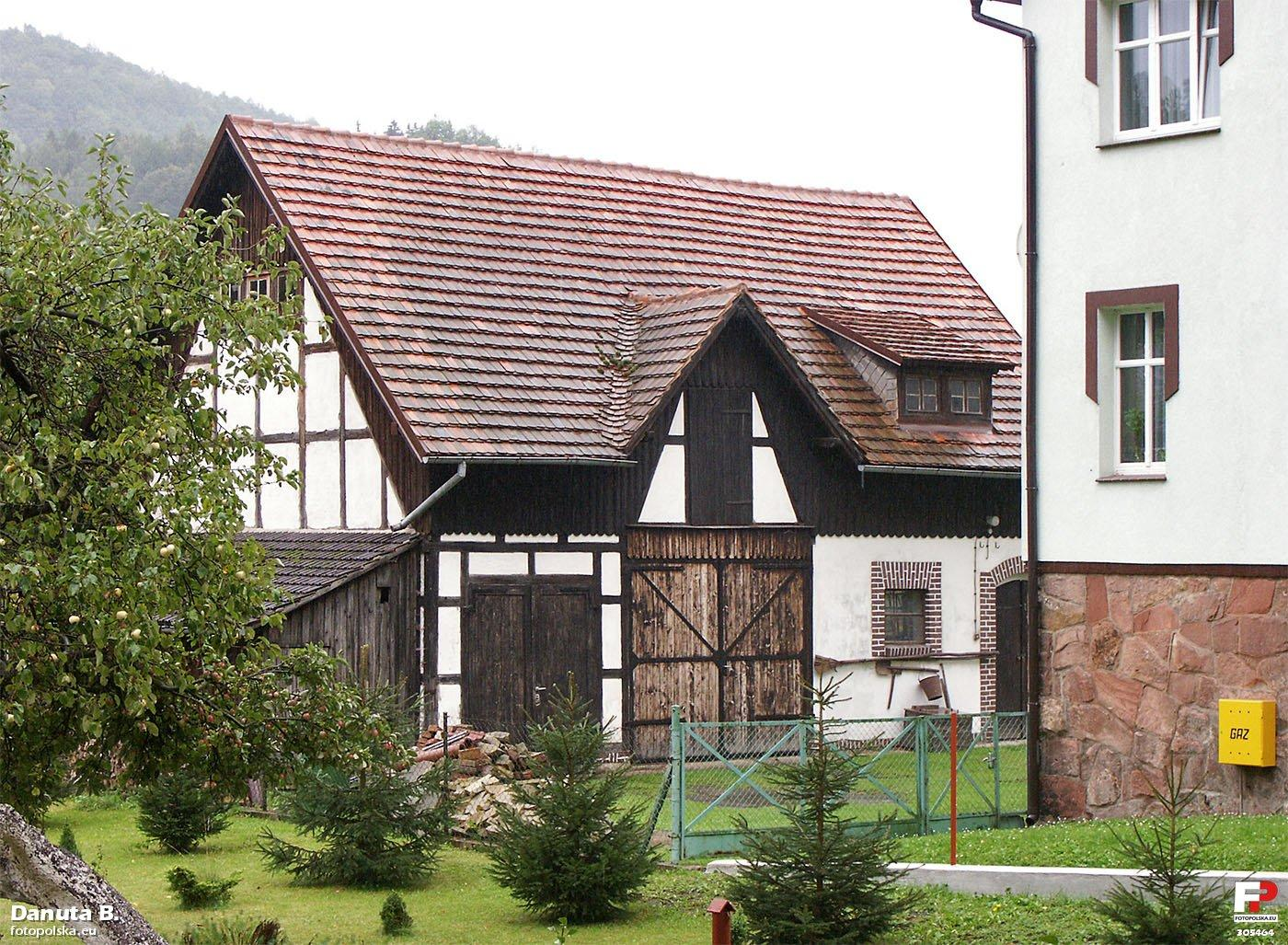

- Location within Poland
- Coordinates: 50°58′49″N 15°38′16″E
- Country: Poland
- Voivodeship: Lower Silesian
- County: Lwówek
- Gmina: Wleń
- Time zone: UTC+1 (CET)
  - Summer (DST): UTC+2 (CEST)
- Vehicle registration: DLW

Pilchowice [pilxɔˈvit͡sɛ] is a village in the administrative district of Gmina Wleń, within Lwówek County, Lower Silesian Voivodeship, in south-western Poland.

The Pilchowice Dam is located near the village.
