= Polańczyk =

- Village
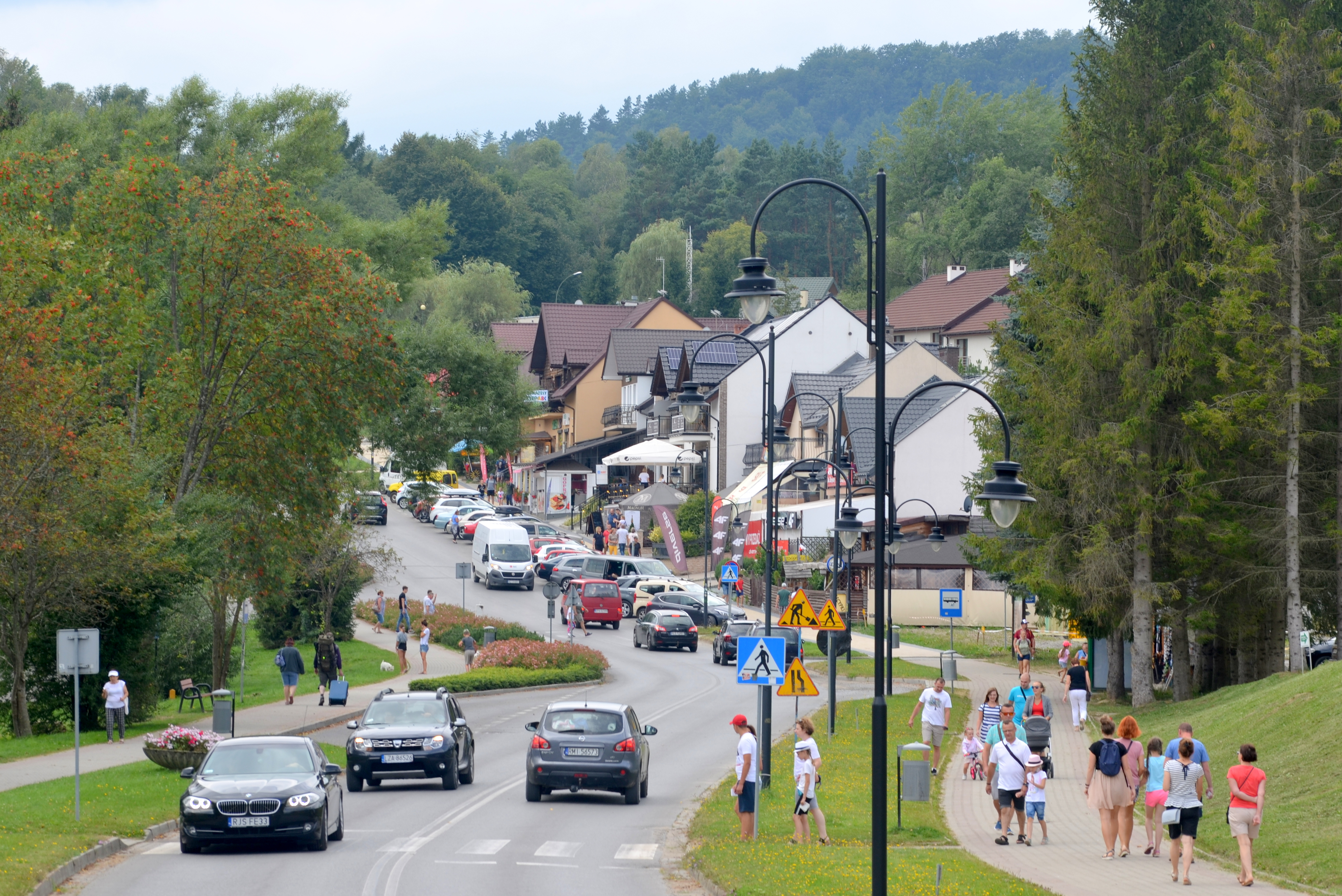
- Village center

- Location within Poland
- Coordinates: 49°22′10″N 22°25′11″E
- Country: Poland
- Voivodeship: Subcarpathian
- County: Lesko
- Gmina: Solina
- Elevation: 482 m (1,581 ft)
- Population: 830 (2,002)
- Website: http://www.polanczyk.pl

Polańczyk [pɔˈlaɲt͡ʂɨk] is a village in Lesko County, Subcarpathian Voivodeship, in south-eastern Poland.

It was first mentioned in 1580. Its name comes from the West Slavic word polana, meaning "glade". It is a spa village that lies near the shores of Lake Solina and is a popular area for tourists visiting the lake.
