= Myczkowce =

- Village
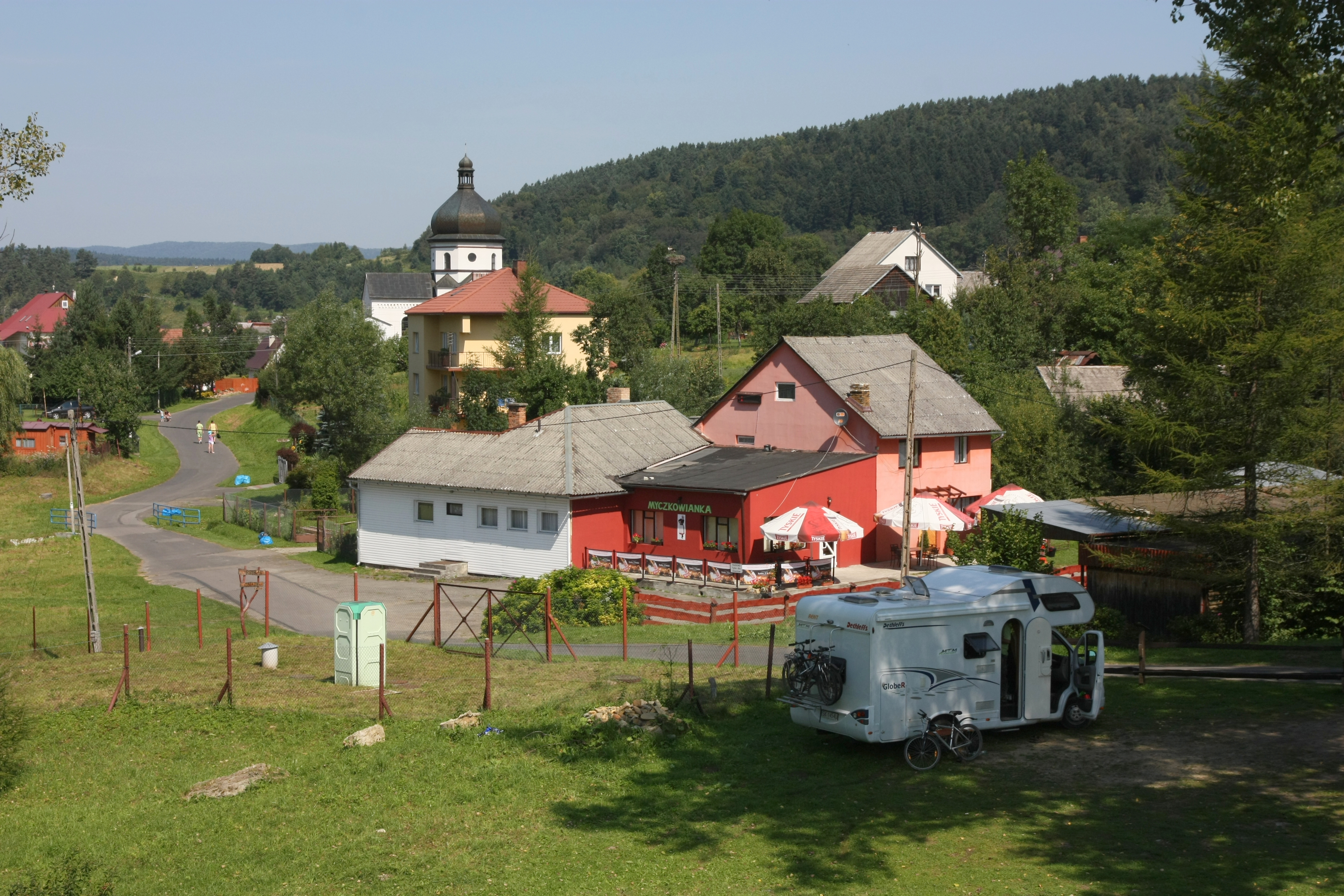
- General view of the village

- Location within Poland
- Coordinates: 49°26′14″N 22°24′37″E
- Country: Poland
- Voivodeship: Subcarpathian
- County: Lesko
- Gmina: Solina

Population
  - Total: 510

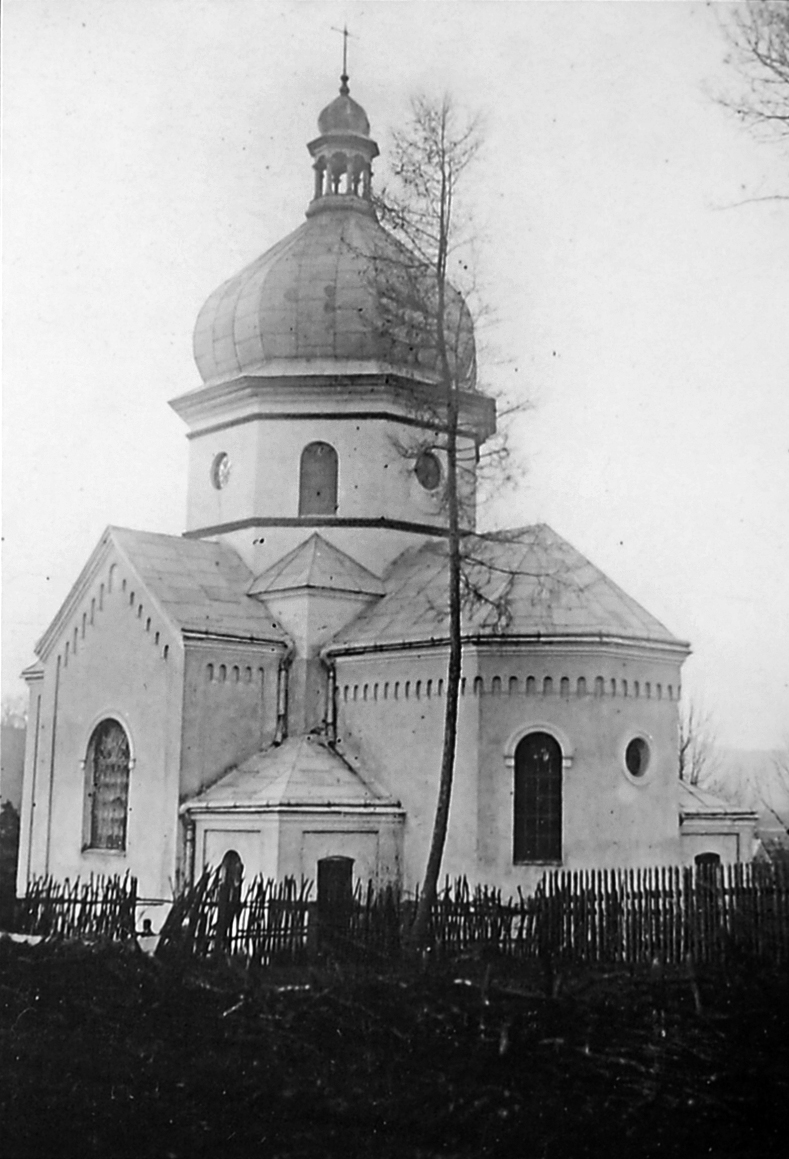
Ukrainian church in Mychkivtsy (pl. Myczkowce) (photo 1912)

Myczkowce [mɨt͡ʂˈkɔft͡sɛ] is a village in the administrative district of Gmina Solina, within Lesko County, Subcarpathian Voivodeship, in south-eastern Poland.

In 1910–1914, a new Ukrainian church was built instead of a wooden one from 1815. A monumental structure was designed as a synthesis of Ukrainian, Byzantine and Romanesque architectural traditions. The religious community was affiliated with the Diocese of Peremyshl. After the deportation of Ukrainians, the church was used for storage, and since 1979 - as a church for Polish Roman Catholic community.
