= Wooden Tserkvas of the Carpathian Region in Poland and Ukraine =

UNESCO World Heritage Site
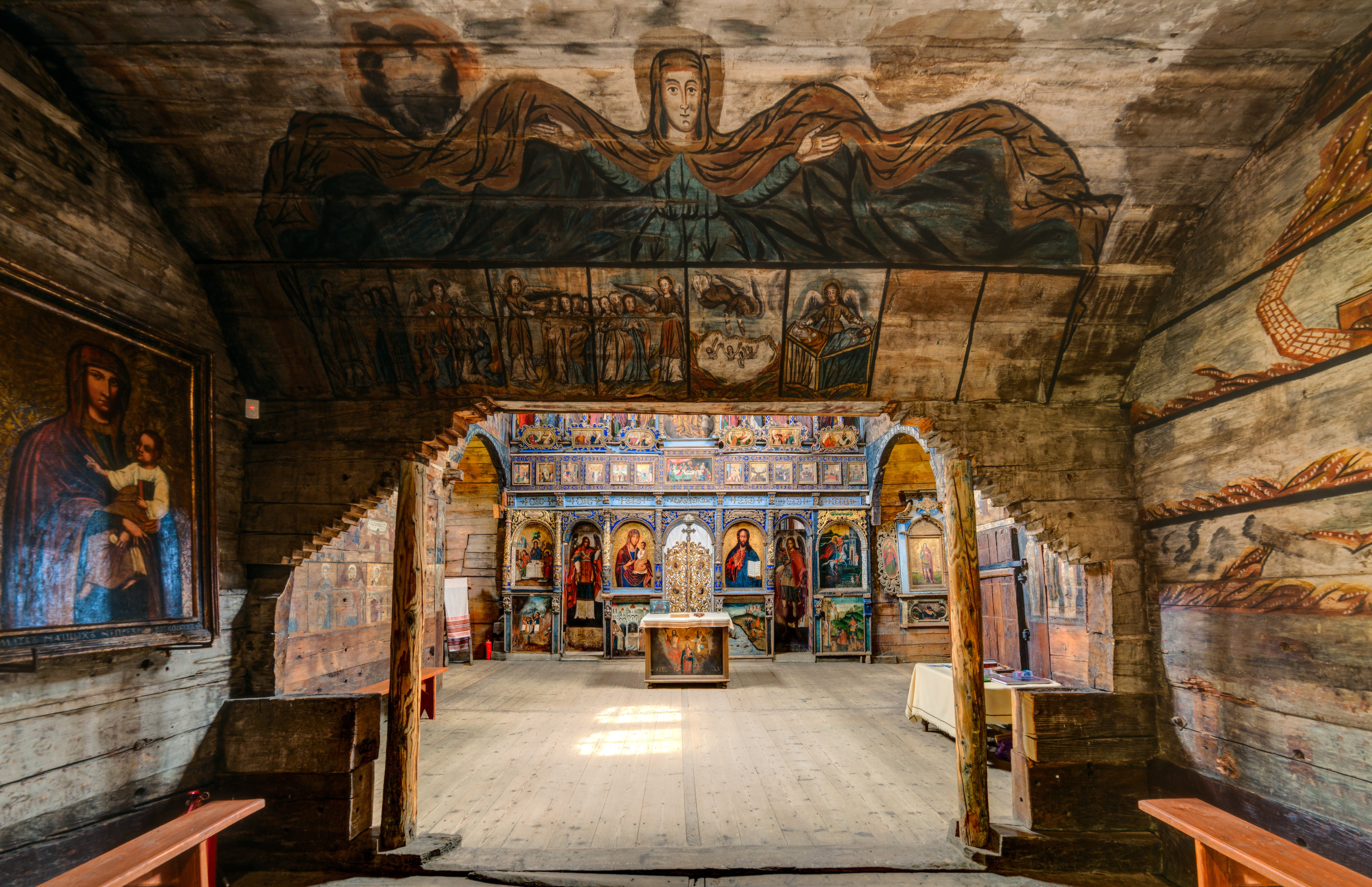
- Interior of Tserkva of Saint George in Drohobych
- Location: Carpathian region in Poland and Ukraine
- Includes: 16 wooden churches, eight in each country
- Criteria: Cultural: iii, iv
- Reference: 1424
- Inscription: 2013 (37th Session)
- Area: 7.03 ha (17.4 acres)
- Buffer zone: 92.73 ha (229.1 acres)

The Wooden Tserkvas of the Carpathian Region in Poland and Ukraine (Note: Polish: Drewniane cerkwie regionu karpackiego w Polsce i na Ukrainie; Ukrainian: Дерев'яні церкви карпатського регіону Польщі та України, romanized: Derevjani cerkvy karpac'koho rehionu Pol'šči ta Ukrajiny) are a group of wooden Eastern Orthodox and Greek Catholic churches (Polish: cerkwie; Ukrainian: церкви, tserkvy) located in Poland and Ukraine which were inscribed in 2013 on the UNESCO World Heritage List which explains:

built of horizontal wooden logs between the 16th and 19th centuries by communities of Orthodox and Greek Catholic faiths. The tserkvas bear testimony to a distinct building tradition rooted in Orthodox ecclesiastic design interwoven with elements of local tradition, and symbolic references to their communities’ cosmogony. — World Heritage Centre

== Sites ==
List of the sites
| Name | Picture | Location | UNESCO ID Property area | Coordinates | Description |
|---|---|---|---|---|---|
| Tserkva of Saint Michael the Archangel | A wooden church with a bell tower | Brunary, Poland | 1424-001 0.32 ha (0.79 acres) | 49.53389°N 21.03222°E | |
| Tserkva of the Birth of the Blessed Virgin Mary | A wooden church | Chotyniec, Poland | 1424-002 0.67 ha (1.7 acres) | 49.952972°N 23.00278°E | |
| Tserkva of Saint George | A woden church | Drohobych, Ukraine | 1424-003 0.18 ha (0.44 acres) | 49.3477361°N 23.49944°E | |
| Tserkva of Saint Paraskeva | A wooden church with a bell tower | Kwiatoń, Poland | 1424-004 0.26 ha (0.64 acres) | 49.501333°N 21.1726833°E | |
| Tserkva of the Synaxis of the Blessed Virgin Mary | A wooden church | Matkiv, Ukraine | 1424-005 0.16 ha (0.40 acres) | 48.915472°N 23.10889°E | |
| Tserkva of the Nativity of the Blessed Virgin Mary | A wooden church that is almost entirely covered in metal | Nyzhnii Verbizh, Ukraine | 1424-006 2.22 ha (5.5 acres) | 48.4986556°N 25.0114694°E | |
| Tserkva of Our Lady's Protection | A wooden church with a bell tower | Owczary, Poland | 1424-007 0.38 ha (0.94 acres) | 49.58861°N 21.19111°E | |
| Tserkva of the Descent of the Holy Spirit | A wooden church | Potelych, Ukraine | 1424-008 0.19 ha (0.47 acres) | 50.20861°N 23.55083°E | |
| Tserkva of Saint James the Less, the Apostle | A wooden church with a bell tower | Powroźnik, Poland | 1424-009 0.71 ha (1.8 acres) | 49.36972°N 20.9504194°E | |
| Tserkva of Saint Paraskeva | A wooden church | Radruż, Poland | 1424-010 0.3 ha (0.74 acres) | 50.1764028°N 23.4010667°E | |
| Tserkva of the Descent of the Holy Spirit | A wooden church and a bell tower | Rohatyn, Ukraine | 1424-011 0.49 ha (1.2 acres) | 49.41028°N 24.6029139°E | |
| Tserkva of Saint Michael the Archangel | A wooden church | Smolnik, Poland | 1424-012 0.35 ha (0.86 acres) | 49.209639°N 22.68778°E | |
| Tserkva of Saint Michael the Archangel | A wooden church and a bell tower | Turzańsk, Poland | 1424-013 0.3 ha (0.74 acres) | 49.369194°N 22.128944°E | |
| Tserkva of the Synaxis of the Archangel Michael | A wooden church | Uzhok, Ukraine | 1424-014 0.12 ha (0.30 acres) | 48.9840111°N 22.8545889°E | |
| Tserkva of Our Lord's Ascension | A wooden church | Yasinia, Ukraine | 1424-015 0.13 ha (0.32 acres) | 48.255139°N 24.344583°E | |
| Tserkva of the Holy Trinity | A wooden church | Zhovkva, Ukraine | 1424-016 0.25 ha (0.62 acres) | 50.0553389°N 23.9822139°E | |

== Location map ==
Wooden tserkvas of the Carpathian region in Poland and Ukraine

== See also ==
- Lemko Region
- Vernacular architecture of the Carpathians
- Carpathian wooden churches
- Eastern Orthodox church architecture
