= St. James Church, Powroźnik =

St. James Church in Powroźnik
- Cerkiew św. Jakuba w Powroźniku
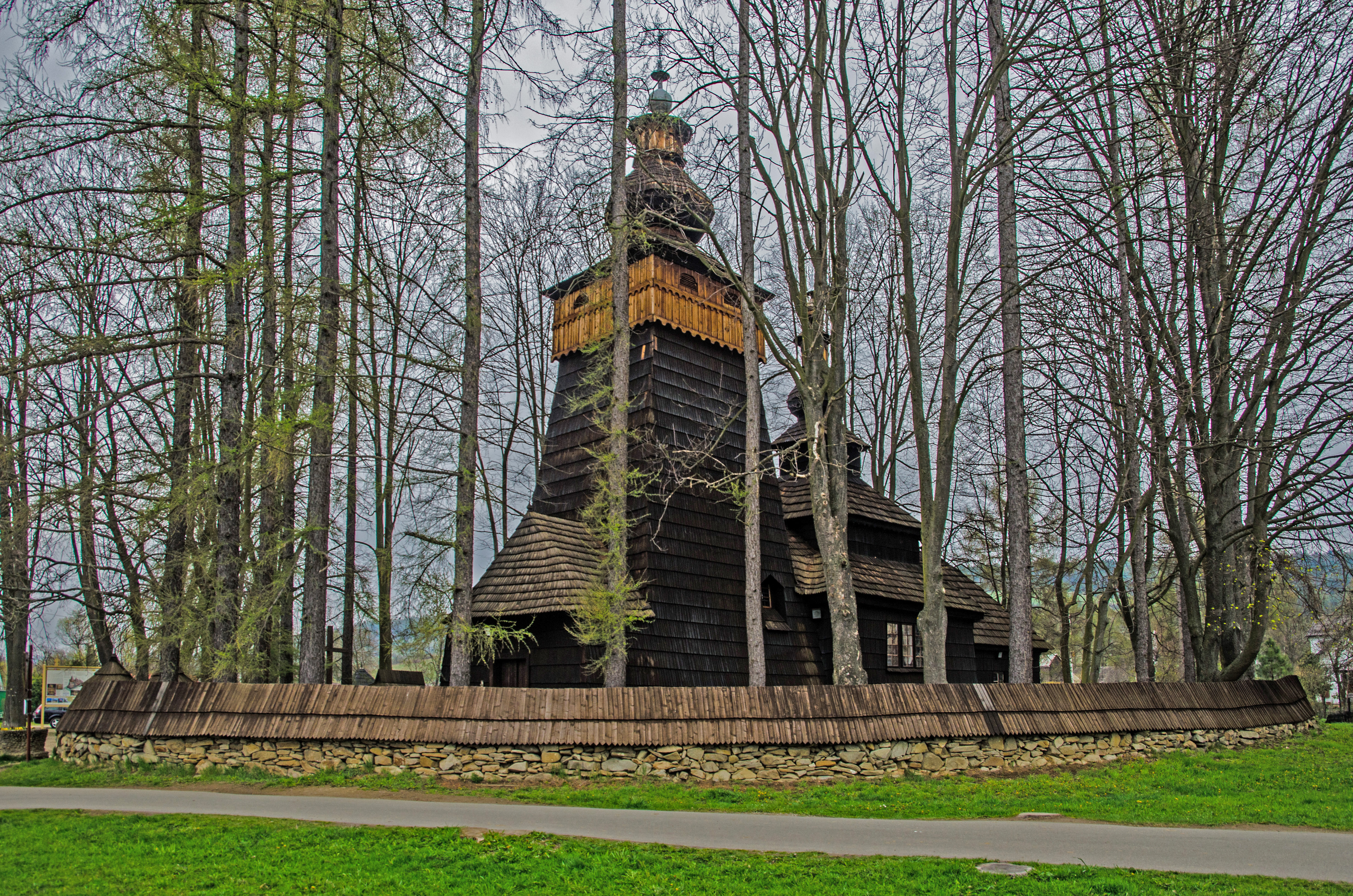
- St. James Church in Powroźnik
- Address: Powroźnik
- Country: Poland
- Denomination: Roman Catholic Church

History
- Status: active church

Architecture
- Style: Gothic
- Years built: 17-18 century

Administration
- Diocese: Roman Catholic Diocese of Tarnów

UNESCO World Heritage Site
- Part of: Wooden Tserkvas of the Carpathian Region in Poland and Ukraine
- Criteria: Cultural: (iii), (iv)
- Reference: 1424-009
- Inscription: 2013 (37th Session)

St. James Church is a Gothic, wooden church located in the village of Powroźnik, southern Poland. It dates from the seventeenth or eighteenth-century. Together with different tserkvas it is designated as part of the UNESCO World Heritage Site "Wooden tserkvas of the Carpathian region in Poland and Ukraine".

== History ==
The tserkva in Powroźnik has existed since around 1600, but only a part of the former structure remains, arranged into the sacristy of the present tserkva. The architecture of the present tserkva was constructed between the seventeenth and eighteenth-century, with a major reconstruction in 1813. The tserkva was moved from its former location due to the danger posed by flooding, after which it was expanded. After Operation Vistula the tserkva was transformed to a Roman Catholic church.
