= St. Michael Archangel's Church, Turzańsk =

Coordinates: 49.3692°N 22.1289°E

St. Michael Archangel's Church in Turzańsk
- Cerkiew św. Michała Archanioła w Turzańsku
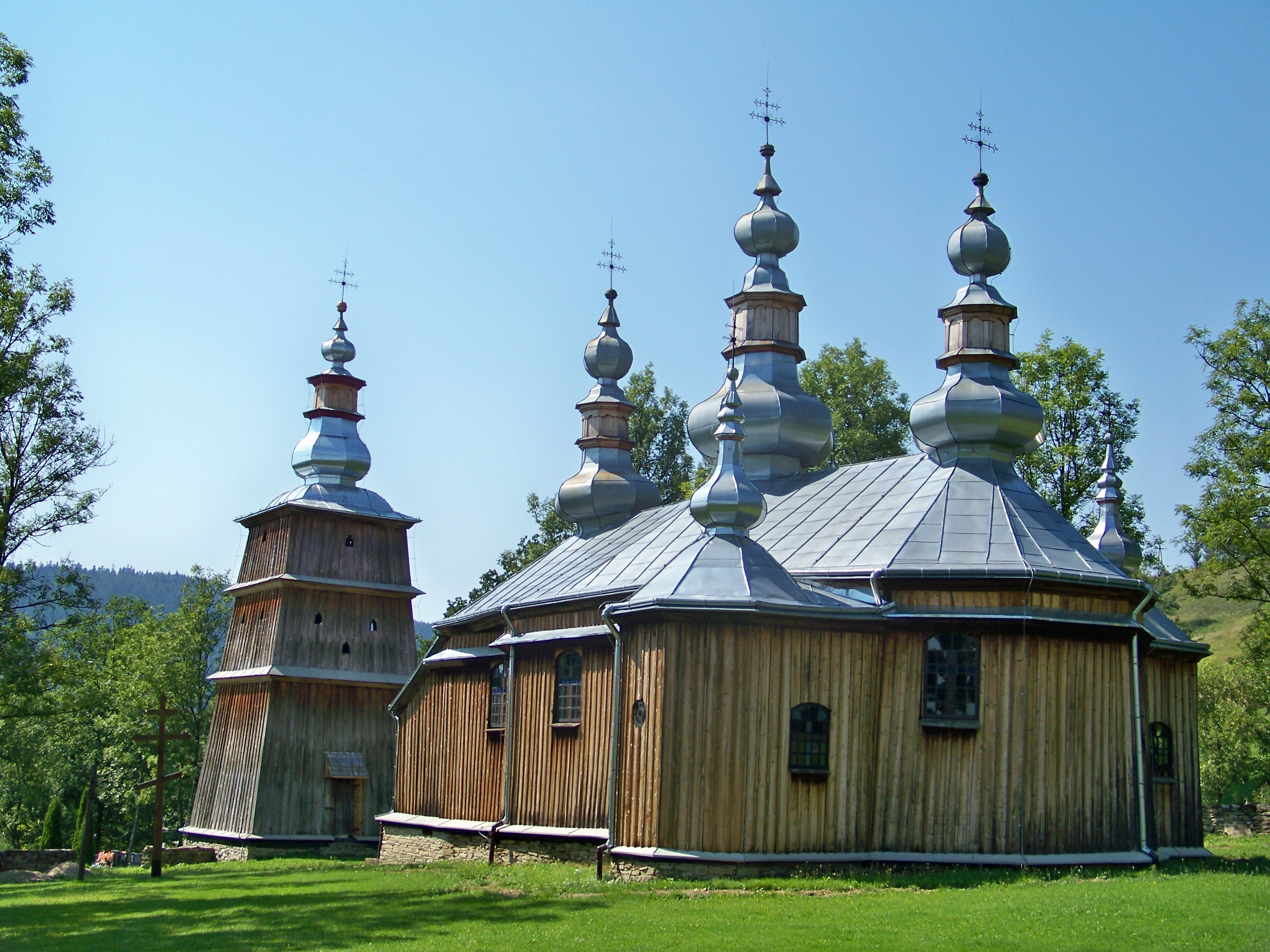
- St. Michael Archangel's Church in Turzańsk
- Address: Turzańsk
- Country: Poland
- Denomination: Eastern Orthodox

History
- Status: active church

Architecture
- Style: Gothic
- Groundbreaking: 1801
- Completed: 1803, 1836

UNESCO World Heritage Site
- Part of: Wooden Tserkvas of the Carpathian Region in Poland and Ukraine
- Criteria: Cultural: (iii), (iv)
- Reference: 1424-013
- Inscription: 2013 (37th Session)

St. Michael Archangel's Church in Turzańsk (Polish: Cerkiew św. Michała Archanioła w Turzańsku, Ukrainian: Церква Архангела Михаїла) is a nineteenth-century wooden church located in the village of Turzańsk. Along with various other tserkvas, it is designated as part of the UNESCO Wooden tserkvas of the Carpathian region in Poland and Ukraine.

== History ==
The tserkva in Turzańsk, originally established as an Eastern Orthodox Church tsekva, later became Uniate and was referenced in the first half of the sixteenth century. The present tserkva was built in 1801 and expanded in 1836 with a foyer and sacristy. It underwent renovation in 1896 and 1913, with the roof strengthened with tin. After the Lemko population was displaced from the area as part of Operation Vistula, the tserkva was used by Roman Catholics from 1947 to 1961. In 1963, it was returned to the Polish Orthodox Church. The interior of the tserkva features original components: iconostasis from 1895, and a polychrome from the turning point of the nineteenth and twentieth century.
