= Protection of Our Most Holy Lady Church, Owczary =

Coordinates: 49.5886°N 21.1915°E

Protection of Our Most Holy Lady Church
- Cerkiew Opieki Matki Bożej w Owczarach
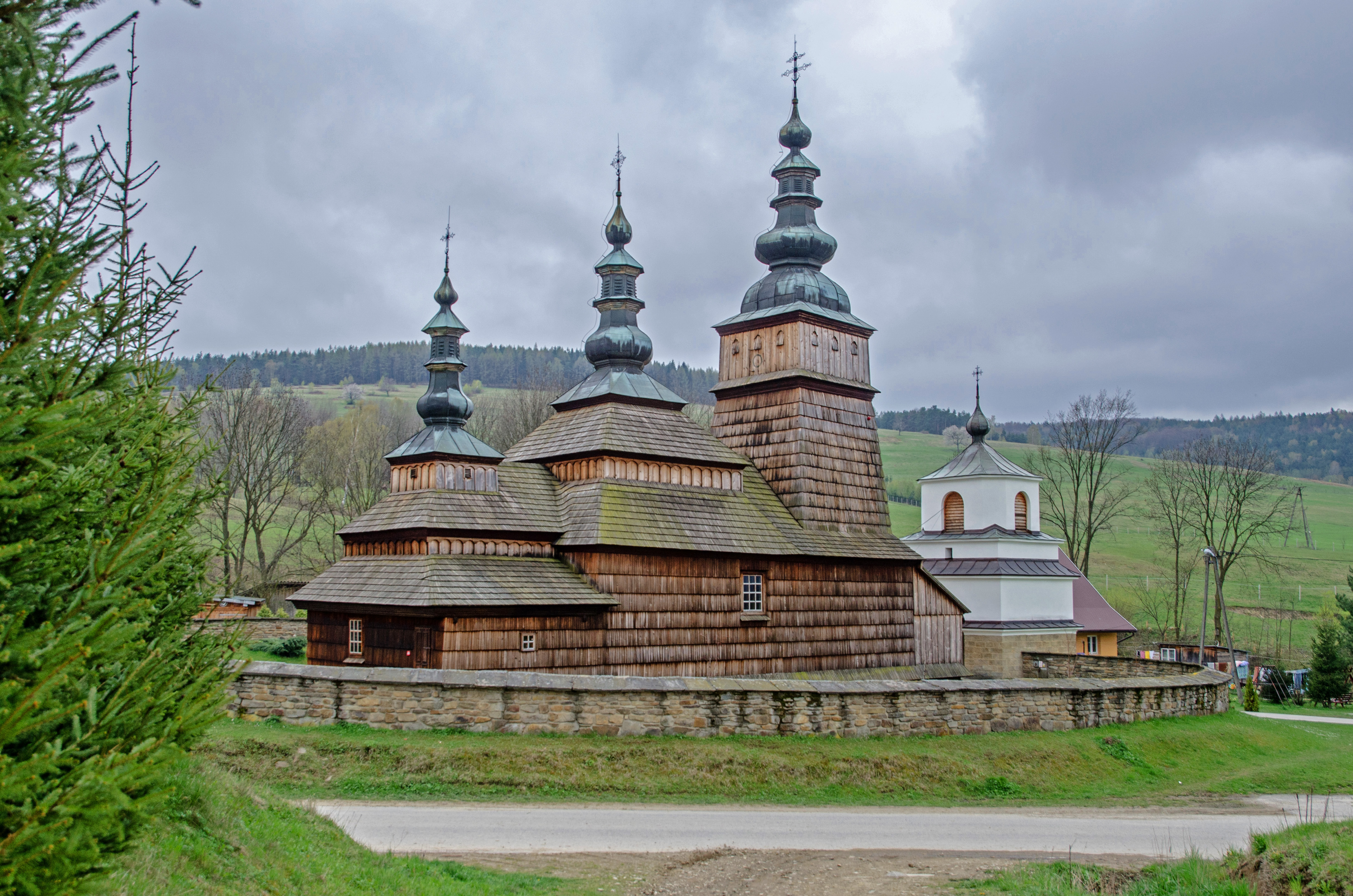
- Protection of Our Most Holy Lady Church
- Address: Owczary, Gorlice County
- Country: Poland
- Denomination: Roman Catholic Church and Ukrainian Greek Catholic Church

History
- Status: active church

Architecture
- Completed: 1653

Administration
- Diocese: Roman Catholic Diocese of Rzeszów and Ukrainian Catholic Archeparchy of Przemyśl–Warsaw

UNESCO World Heritage Site
- Part of: Wooden Tserkvas of the Carpathian Region in Poland and Ukraine
- Criteria: Cultural: (iii), (iv)
- Reference: 1424-007
- Inscription: 2013 (37th Session)

Protection of Our Most Holy Lady Church in Owczary is a Gothic, wooden church located in the village of Owczary from the seventeenth century, which together with different tserkvas is designated as part of the UNESCO Wooden tserkvas of the Carpathian region in Poland and Ukraine.

== History ==
The tserkva in Owczary was raised in 1653. The tserkva is the second building of its type in this location - the first collapsed due to quicksand in its foundations. In 1701, the tserkva's chancery underwent extensive renovation, the tower was built in 1783 (built by meisters Dimitr Dekowekin and Teodor Rusinka), in 1870, the building was widened, to have equal measurements to that of the nave. In 1938, the tserkva's interior was decorated with a polychrome. After Operation Vistula, the tserkva was transferred to the Roman Catholic parish. After some of the displaced villagers came back to the village in 1956, the tserkva had also restarted Ukrainian Greek Catholic Church services. Since 1998, the tserkva began to function as a Roman Catholic-Ukrainian Greek Catholic Church.
