= Church of the Synaxis of the Blessed Virgin Mary, Matkiv =

Church building in Matkiv, Ukraine

Church of the Synaxis of the Blessed Virgin Mary
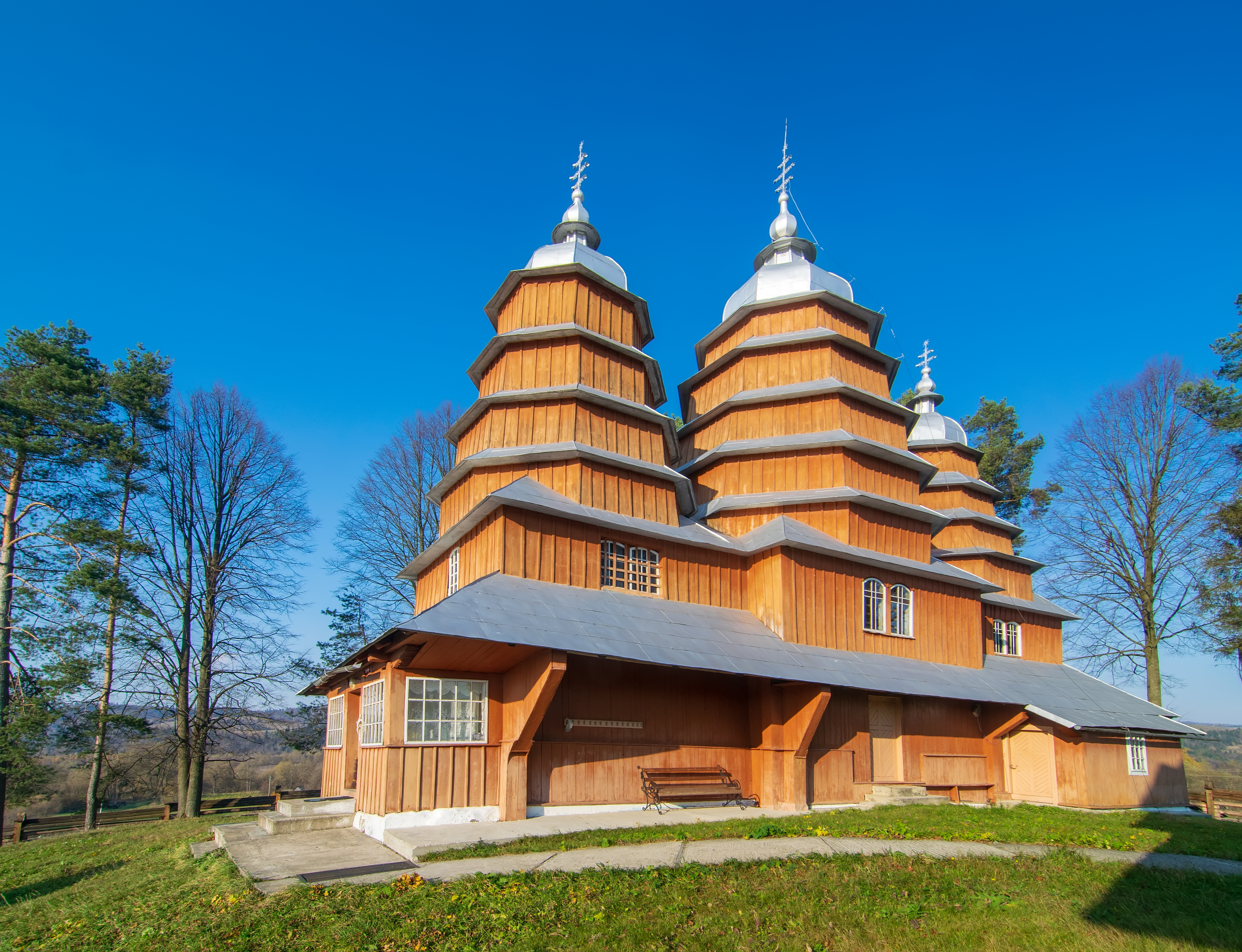

Religion
- Affiliation: Ukrainian Greek Catholic Church
- District: Ukrainian Catholic Eparchy of Sambir–Drohobych

Location
- Location: Matkiv, Lviv Oblast
- Country: Ukraine
- Interactive map of Church of the Synaxis of the Blessed Virgin Mary
- Coordinates: 48°54′56″N 23°06′32″E

Architecture
- Architects: Ivan Melnykovych and Vasyl Ivanykovych
- Type: Wooden church
- Style: Boyko
- Completed: 1838
- UNESCO World Heritage Site
- Official name: Tserkva of the Synaxis of the Blessed Virgin Mary
- Criteria: Cultural: iii, iv
- Designated: 2013
- Parent listing: Wooden Tserkvas of the Carpathian Region in Poland and Ukraine
- Reference no.: 1424-005
- Immovable Monument of National Significance of Ukraine
- Official name: Богородицька церква та дзвіниця (дер.) (Nativity of the Theotokos Church and bell tower (wooden))
- Type: Architecture
- Reference no.: 130164

Church of the Synaxis of the Blessed Virgin Mary (Ukrainian: Церква Собору Пресвятої Богородиці) is a wooden church in Matkiv, Ukraine, built in 1838. It is an outstanding monument of Boyko architecture and art. This church, together with other wooden churches of the Carpathian region, was inscribed in UNESCO World Heritage List on 21 June 2013 at 37th session of the World Heritage Committee.

== History ==
Church of the Synaxis of the Blessed Virgin Mary was constructed in 1838 by the master craftsmen Ivan Melnykovych and Vasyl Ivanykovych. Women constituted the majority of the workforce as, at the time, the male population of the village was massively recruited to the Austro-Hungarian army.

On 14 June 2010, the church was struck by a lightning. The building caught fire but was saved from destruction by the automatic fire extinguishing system.

== Description ==
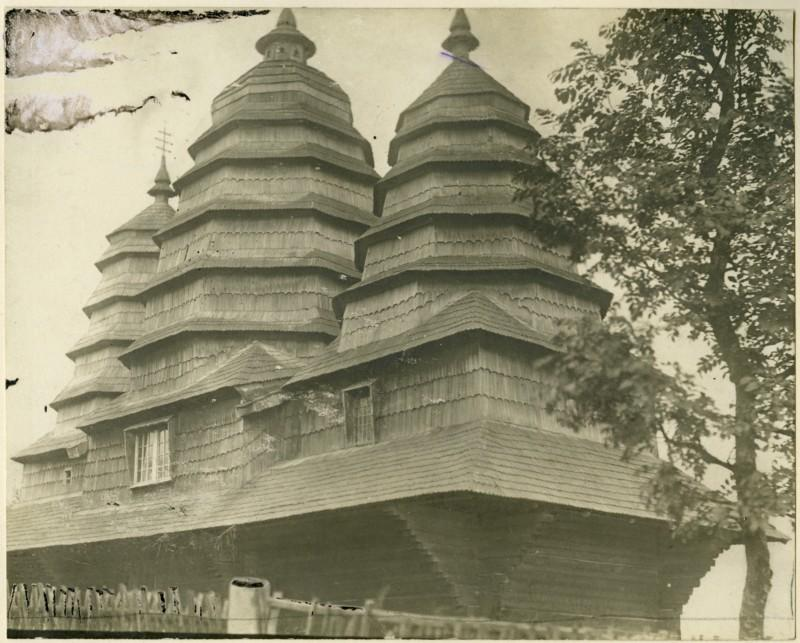
The church in 1904

The church in May 2020 (video)

The church is located on a hill in the central part of the village, 250 metres (820 ft) from the nearest highway, in the valley of Stryi river.

The church is a three-part, three-domed structure that belongs to the Boyko architectural style. Its square frames (the nave's being wider) are located on the west-east axis. Small rectangular sacristies adjoin the altar from both sides. The main structures are topped by octangular roofs, with five breaks above the nave. Above the altar and the narthex, there are four breaks, crowned by helmet-shaped domes with finials and crosses.

A roof overhang encircles the church, supported by stepped projections of the log walls, under which a glazed porch is situated on the western façade. The church's eaves have a distinct rectangular shape and a large overhang, beneath which the lower part of the church is located.

The walls of the lower and upper eaves and the gables are clad vertically with boards.

== Bell tower ==
The bell tower is located southwest of the church. It is wooden, three-storey, and square in plan, featuring a balcony on the second storey that faces a small square in front of the church's southern façade. It is topped by a hipped roof with a latticed gallery above. The bell tower was built in 1924 by the master craftsman Mykhailo Veklych.

== Literature ==
- Богородицька церква 1838 р. (дерев.) і дзвіниця 19 ст. (дерев.) [Theotokos Church 1838 (wooden) and bell tower 19th c. (wooden)]. Пам'ятники архітектури УРСР, що перебувають під державною охороною: список [Architectural monuments of Ukrainian SSR under state protection: list]. — Kyiv: Derzhbudvydav, 1956. — p. 28.
- Постанова Ради міністрів УРСР «Про впорядкування справи обліку та охорони пам'ятників архітектури на території Української РСР» № 970 від 24.08.1963 р. [Resolution of the Soviet of Ministers of the Ukrainian SSR "On the Organization of the Registration and Protection of Architectural Monuments on the Territory of the Ukrainian SSR"]
- Матков, село. Рождества Богородицы церковь, 1838 г., и колокольня, начало XX в. [Matkiv village. Church of the Nativity of Theotokos, 1838, and bell tower, early 20th c.] // Памятники истории и культуры Украинской ССР: Каталог–справочник [Historical and cultural monuments of the Ukrainian SSR: Catalogue and reference book] / AN UkSSR. Institute of History; Ukrainian Society of the Protection of Historic and Cultural Monuments; ed. Tronko, P. T. —Kyiv: Naukova Dumka, 1987. —p. 343 (in Russian).
- Дзвіниця 1924 р. (дерев.). Богородицька церква 1838 р. (дерев.) [Bell tower 1924 (wooden). Theotokos Church 1838 (wooden)] // Народна архітектура Українських Карпат XV-XX ст.: монографія [Folk architecture of the Ukrainian Carpathians in the 15th–20th centuries: monograph] / Hoshko, Y. H. et al —Kyiv: Naukova Dumka, 1987. —p. 190, 226.
- Дерев'яна церква Собору Богородиці 1838 р. [Wooden Church of the Synaxis of the Theotokos 1838] / Slobodian, V. Каталог існуючих дерев'яних церков України і українських етнічних земель [Catalogue of existing wooden churches of Ukraine and ethnic Ukrainian lands]. — Bulletin of the Institute of Ukrzakhidproektrestavratsiia, 1996. — volume 4. — p. 122.
- Церква Собору Богородиці 1838 р. (дерев.) та дзвіниця 1902 р. (дерев.) [Church of the Synaxis of the Theotokos 1838 (wooden) and bell tower 1902 (wooden)] // Державний реєстр національного культурного надбання: пам'ятки містобудування і архітектури України (проєкт) [State Register of National Cultural Heritage: urban planning and architectural monuments of Ukraine (draft)]. — Monuments of Ukraine, 1999. — no. 2–3.
