= Brunary =

- Village
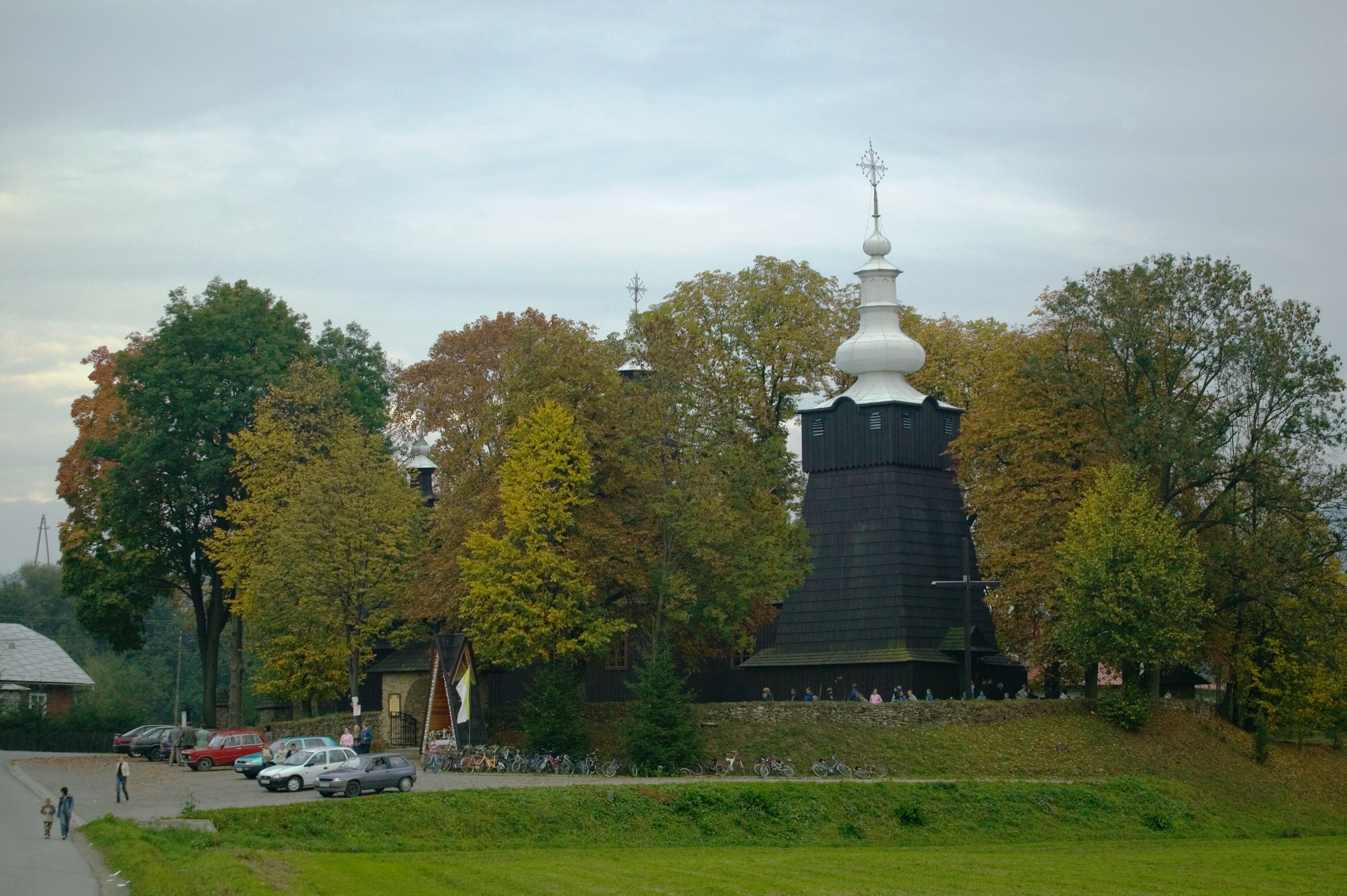
- Greek Catholic church

- Location within Poland
- Coordinates: 49°33′N 21°2′E
- Country: Poland
- Voivodeship: Lesser Poland
- County: Gorlice
- Gmina: Uście Gorlickie
- Population: 813

UNESCO World Heritage Site
- Official name: Brunary Wyżne-Tserkva of Saint Michael the Archangel
- Part of: Wooden Tserkvas of the Carpathian Region in Poland and Ukraine
- Criteria: Cultural: (iii), (iv)
- Reference: 1424-001
- Inscription: 2013 (37th Session)
- Area: 0.32 ha (0.79 acres)
- Buffer zone: 3.36 ha (8.3 acres)

Brunary [bruˈnarɨ] is a village in the administrative district of Gmina Uście Gorlickie, within Gorlice County, Lesser Poland Voivodeship, in southern Poland, close to the border with Slovakia.
