= Chotyniec =

- Village
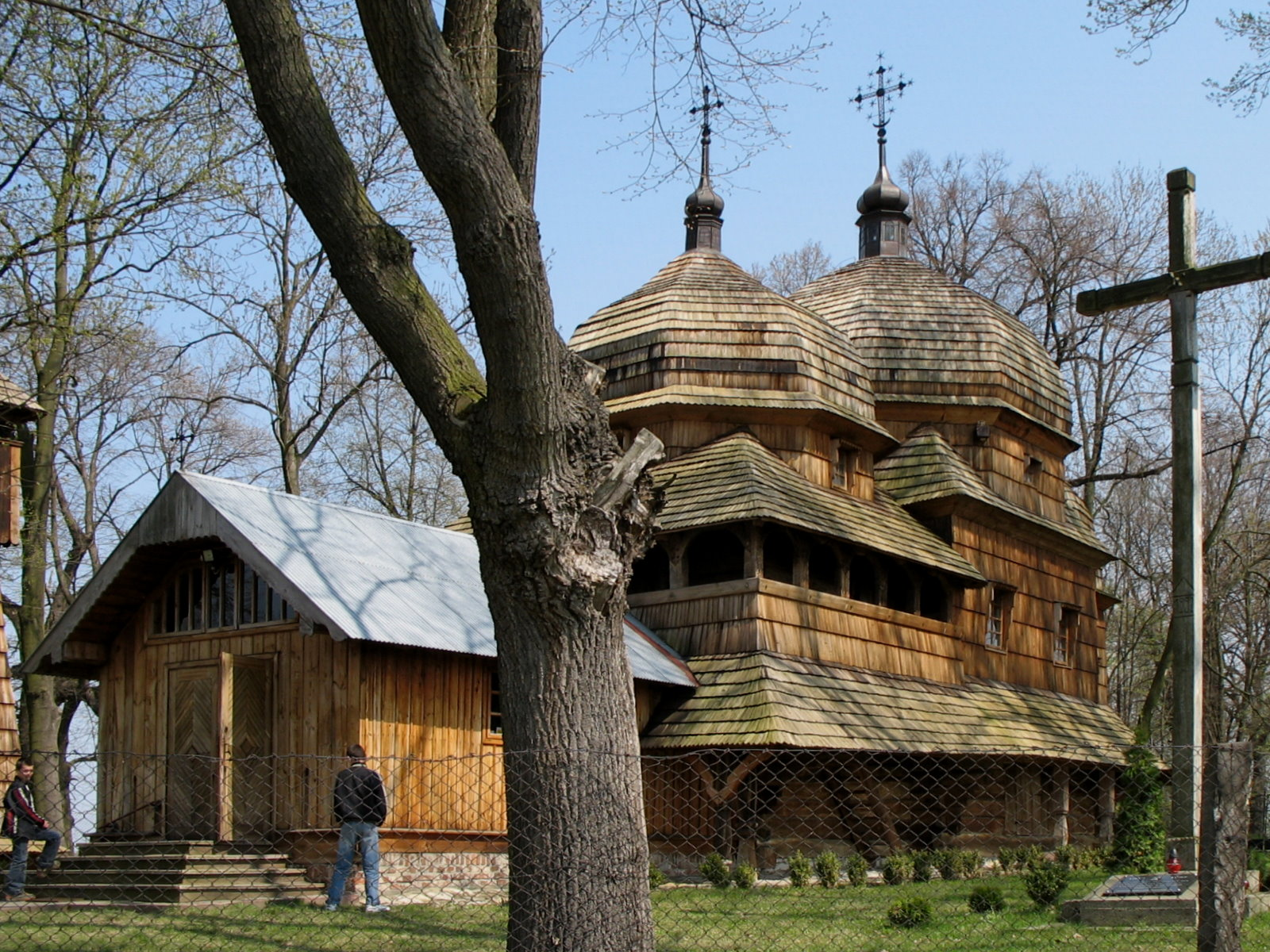
- Greek Catholic church

- Location within Poland
- Coordinates: 49°57′N 23°1′E
- Country: Poland
- Voivodeship: Subcarpathian
- County: Jarosław
- Gmina: Radymno
- Population: 340

UNESCO World Heritage Site
- Official name: Chotyniec-Tserkva of the Birth of the Blessed Virgin Mary
- Part of: Wooden Tserkvas of the Carpathian Region in Poland and Ukraine
- Criteria: Cultural: (iii), (iv)
- Reference: 1424-002
- Inscription: 2013 (37th Session)
- Area: 0.67 ha (1.7 acres)
- Buffer zone: 4.34 ha (10.7 acres)

Chotyniec [xɔˈtɨɲɛt͡s] is a village in the administrative district of Gmina Radymno, within Jarosław County, in the Subcarpathian Voivodeship of south-eastern Poland, close to the border with Ukraine.

== Cerkiew (Wooden Church) of the Holy Mother of God ==
This Ukrainian Greek Catholic Church, probably founded in 1617, is one of the few still active Greek Catholic churches in Poland that survived both World War II and the deportations afterwards. The church has been renovated a number of times (e.g. in 1733 and 1858), and was closed from 1925 until 1947. It then became a Roman Catholic church until somewhere in the 1980s, when it was abandoned. After the fall of Poland's communist regime it became a Ukrainian Greek Catholic church again. It was extensively restored between 1991 and 1994, mostly paid for by local parishioners.

The building is of distinguished originality because of its harmonious, solid appearance. Inside, a complete iconostasis can be seen, as can a Baroque painting of the last judgment from 1735.

In 2013 Church was inscribed onto UNESCO World Heritage Site list.

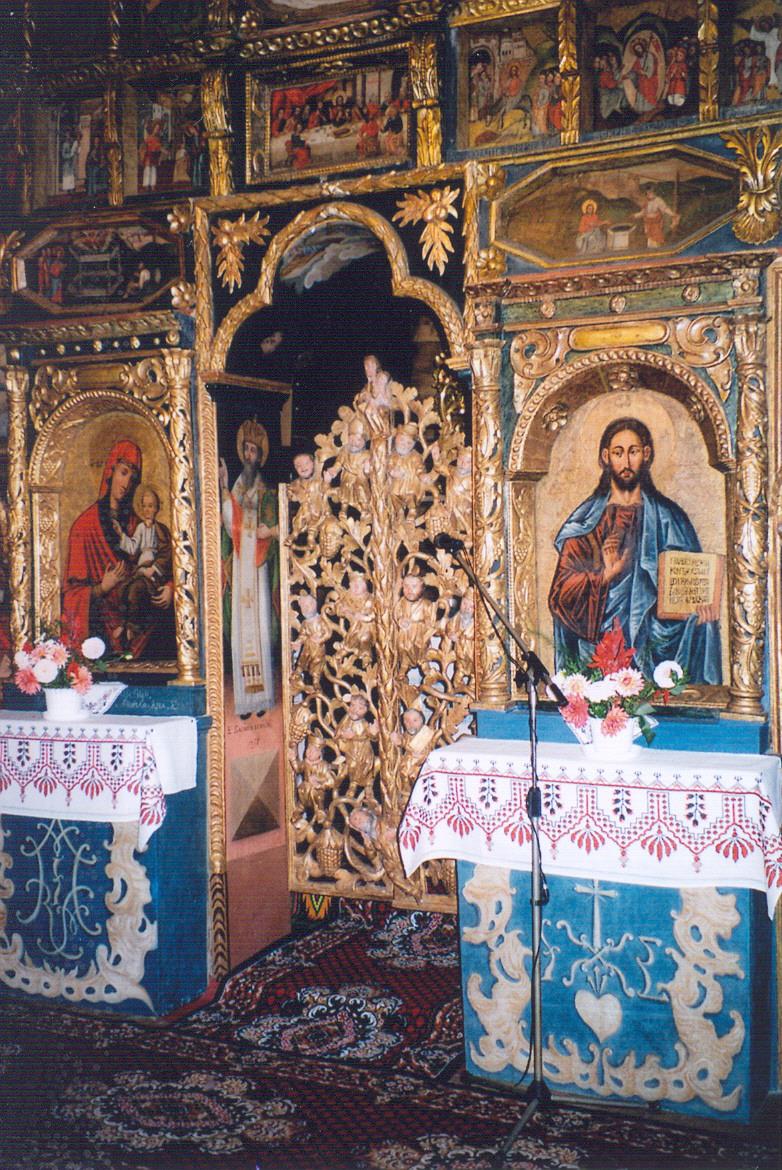
Gilded royal doors carved to represent the tree of life (old wooden church in Chotyniec, Poland).
