= St. Paraskevi Church, Radruż =

St. Paraskevi Church in Radruż
- Cerkiew św. Paraskewy w Radrużu
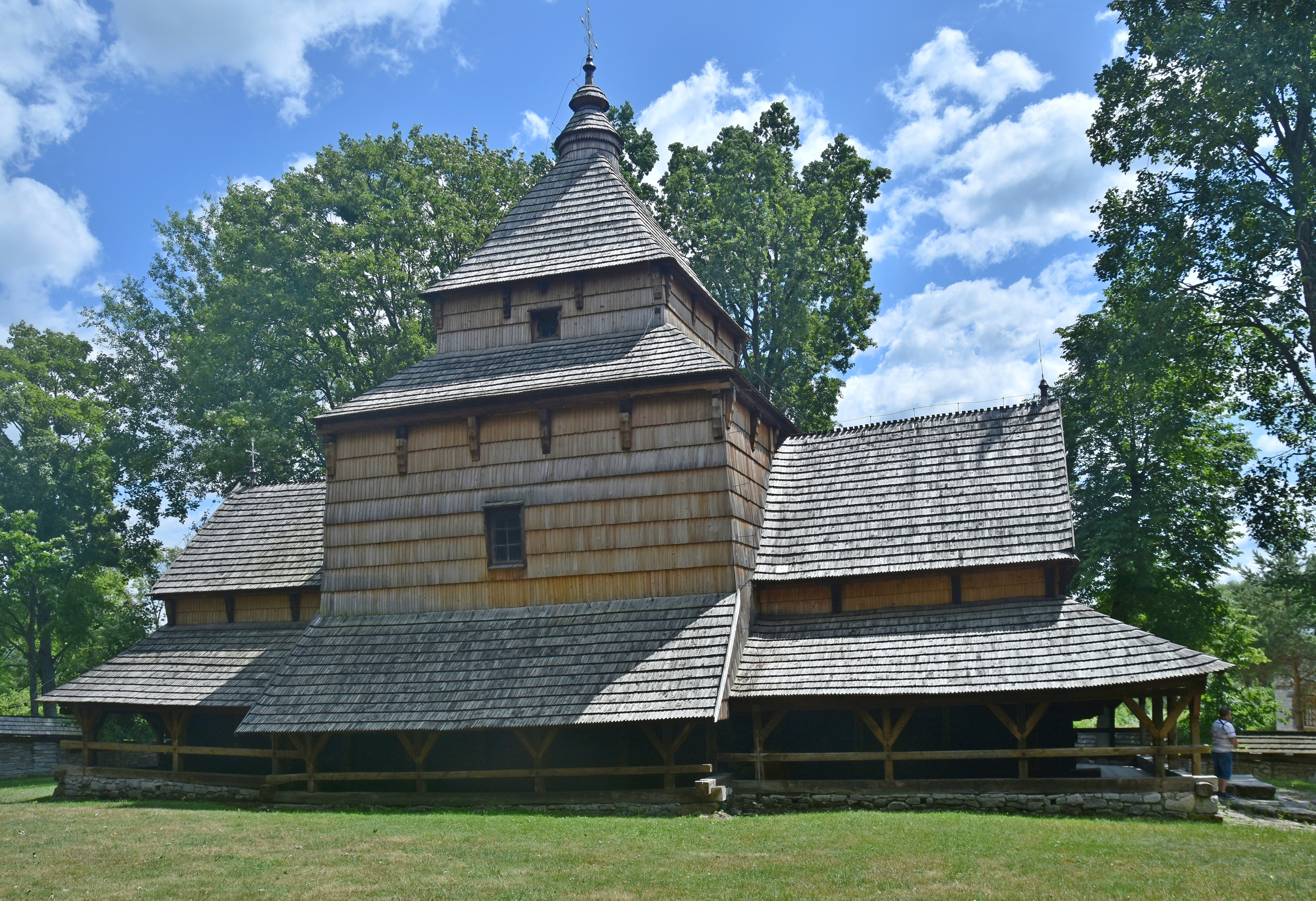
- St. Paraskevi Church in Radruż
- Address: Radruż
- Country: Poland
- Denomination: Ukrainian Greek Catholic

History
- Status: active church

Architecture
- Heritage designation: Historic Monument of Poland
- Designated: 2017-11-22
- Style: Gothic
- Completed: 16th century

Administration
- Diocese: Ukrainian Catholic Archeparchy of Przemyśl–Warsaw

UNESCO World Heritage Site
- Part of: Wooden Tserkvas of the Carpathian Region in Poland and Ukraine
- Criteria: Cultural: (iii), (iv)
- Reference: 1424-010
- Inscription: 2013 (37th Session)

St. Paraskevi Church in Radruż is a Gothic, wooden church from the sixteenth-century located in the village of Radruż, Poland, which together with different tserkvas is designated as part of the UNESCO Wooden tserkvas of the Carpathian region in Poland and Ukraine.

The tserkva belongs to the oldest and best kept wooden sacramental architecture tserkvas in Poland. Part of the prestigious World Monuments Fund (WMF) list of buildings worthy of preservation and financial sponsorship.

The tserkva is located on an oval hill, by the Radrużka stream, and together with the bell tower is surrounded by a wall (existent from 1825), with a fortification structure. The tserkva's structure is constructed out of a fir and oak framework. The tserkva was most likely funded by poseł to Sejm, and starosta Jan Płaza (died 1599). While being used for sacramental services, the tserkva was also used as a fortress against the invasions by the Tatars.
