= St. Michael Archangel's Church, Brunary =

Coordinates: 49.5341°N 21.0326°E

St. Michael Archangel's Church in Brunary
- Cerkiew św. Michała Archanioła w Brunarach
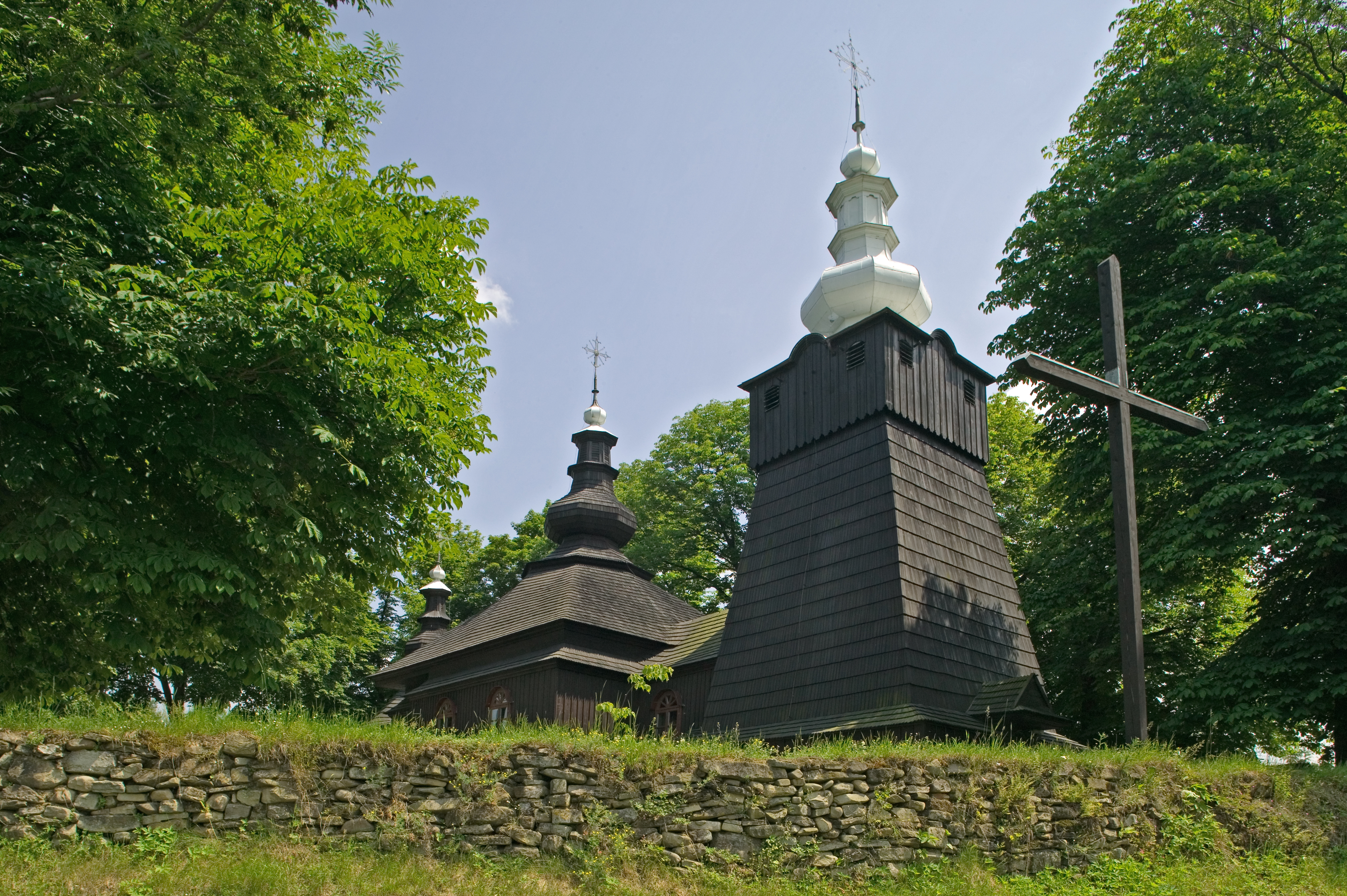
- St. Michael Archangel's Church in Brunary
- Address: Brunary
- Country: Poland
- Denomination: Roman Catholic Church

History
- Status: active church

Architecture
- Style: Gothic
- Completed: 18th century

Administration
- Diocese: Roman Catholic Diocese of Tarnów

UNESCO World Heritage Site
- Part of: Wooden Tserkvas of the Carpathian Region in Poland and Ukraine
- Criteria: Cultural: (iii), (iv)
- Reference: 1424-001
- Inscription: 2013 (37th Session)

St. Michael Archangel's Church in Brunary is a Gothic, wooden church located in the village of Brunary from the eighteenth-century, which together with different tserkvas is designated as part of the UNESCO Wooden tserkvas of the Carpathian region in Poland and Ukraine.

== History ==
The first tserkva in Brunary was raised in 1616, when a Uniate parish was founded in the village. A new tserkva was built in 1653, while the present in the eighteenth-century. In 1831, the tserkva was reconstructed and expanded. The old chancel was connected with the nave, adding a new nave surrounded by three walls, with the whole tserkva covered with a new roof. After Operation Vistula, the tserkva was transformed into a Roman Catholic church.
