= Church of the Ascension, Yasinia =

Church building in Yasinia, Ukraine

Church of the Ascension
- Вознесенська церква
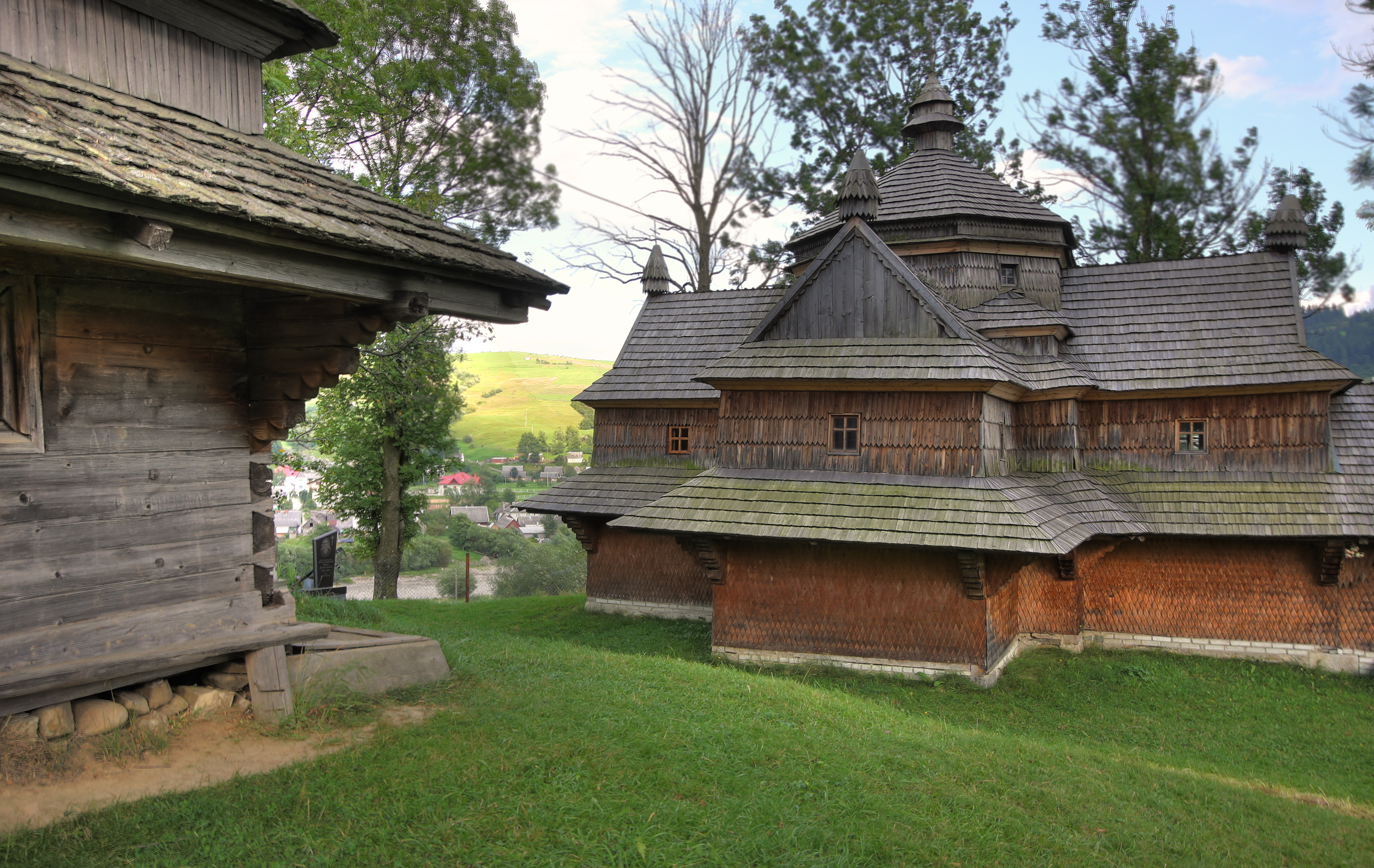
- The church (right) and its bell tower (left)

Religion
- Affiliation: Eastern Orthodox

Location
- Location: Yasinia
- Country: Ukraine
- Interactive map of Church of the Ascension
- Coordinates: 48°15′18″N 24°20′41″E

Architecture
- Type: Wooden church
- Style: Hutsul
- Completed: 1824
- UNESCO World Heritage Site
- Official name: Tserkva of Our Lord's Ascension
- Criteria: Cultural: iii, iv
- Designated: 2013
- Parent listing: Wooden Tserkvas of the Carpathian Region in Poland and Ukraine
- Reference no.: 1424-015
- Immovable Monument of National Significance of Ukraine
- Official name: Церква Вознесіння Господнього (Church of Lord's Ascension)
- Type: Architecture
- Reference no.: 070040/1

Church of the Ascension (Ukrainian: Вознесенська церква) is a wooden church in Yasinia, Rakhiv Raion, Zakarpattia Oblast, Ukraine. It is an architectural monument of national significance and preserves the original iconostasis from the church's construction period.

== Heritage designation ==
In the Soviet period, the church was protected as an architectural monument of Ukrainian SSR (number 201). In 2018, it was transferred to the State Register of Immovable Monuments of Ukraine under number 070040.

In June 2013, the Church of Our Lord's Ascension (also known as Struk Church) was inscribed in the UNESCO World Heritage List. Over 2,000 examples of sacral wooden architecture have survived in Ukraine, largely in the western part of the country (there are over 120 in Zakarpattia Oblast). Poland and Ukraine prepared a joint nomination of Wooden Tserkvas of the Carpathian Region, which was approved by the World Heritage Centre in June 2013. As a result, eight wooden churches from Ukraine have been inscribed in the list: 4 in Lviv Oblast and 2 each in Zakarpattia and Ivano-Frankivsk oblasts.

== Gallery ==
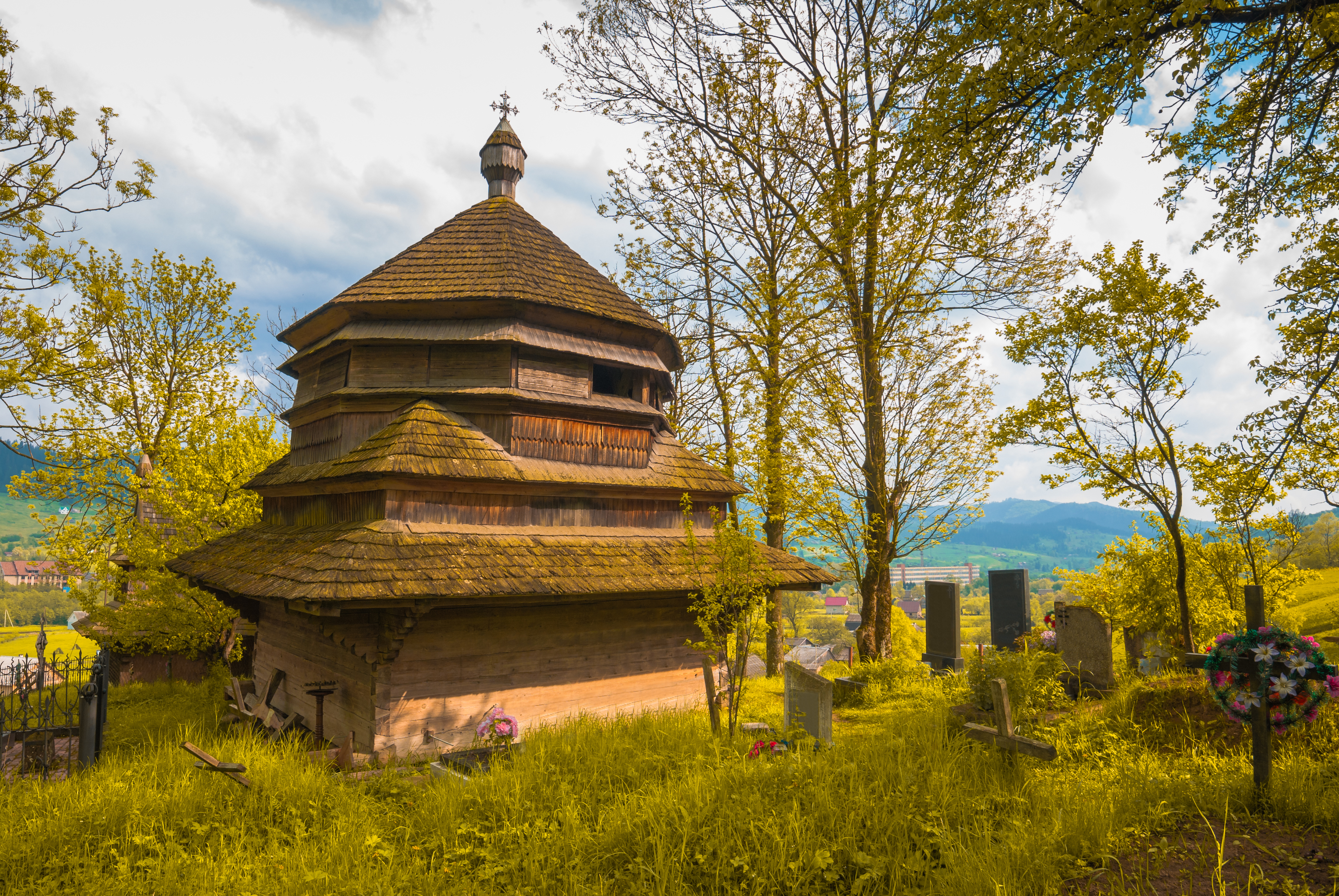
Bell tower

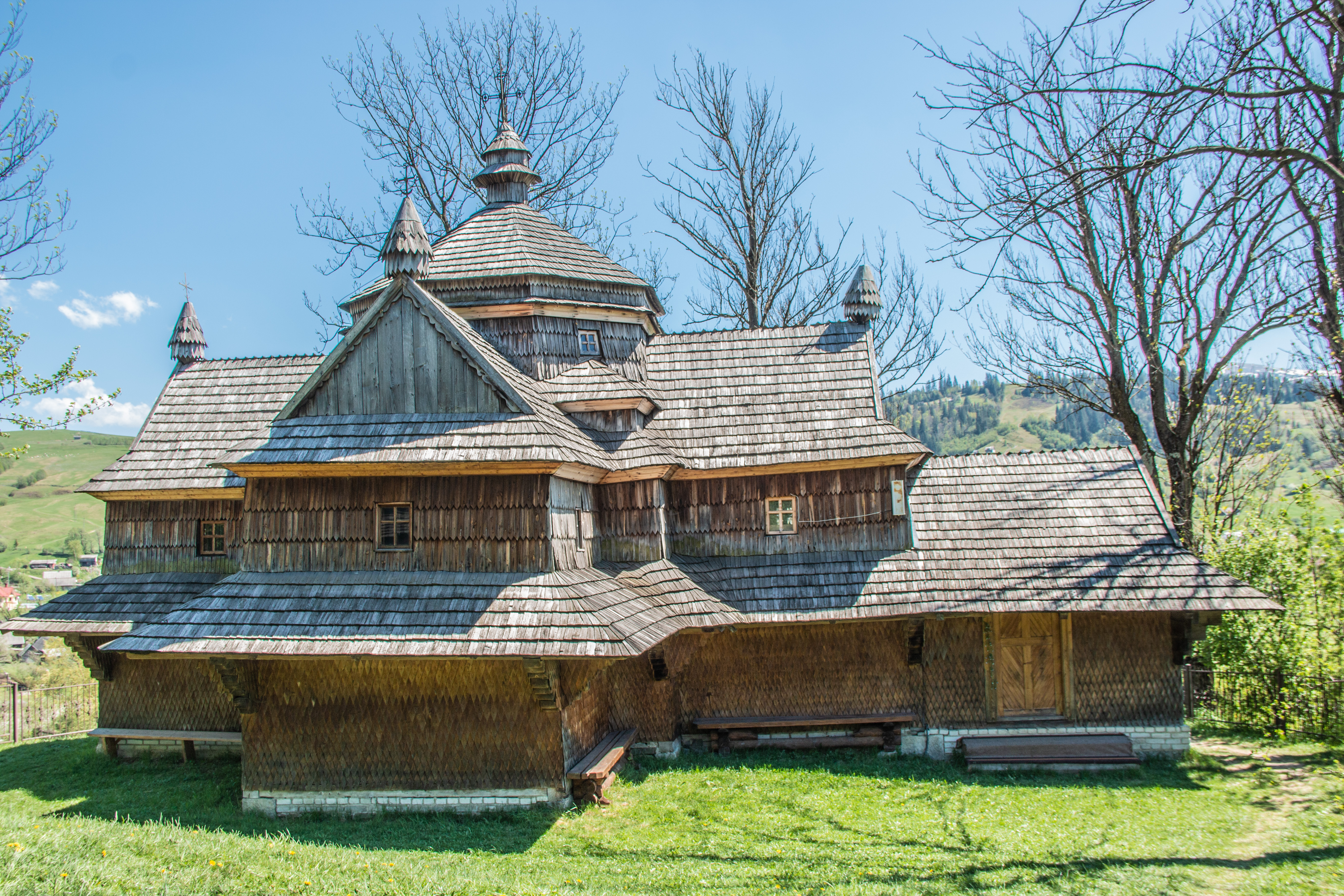
Church

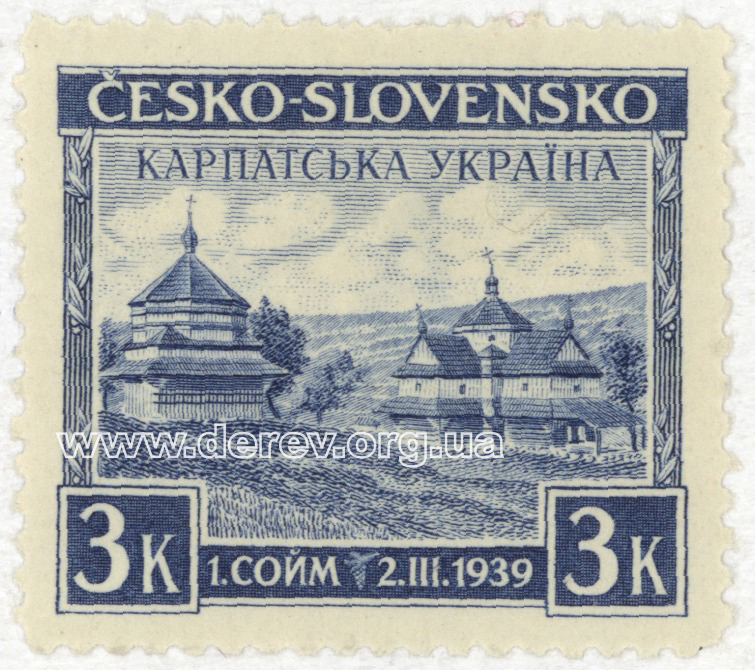
Czechoslovak postage stamp from 1939

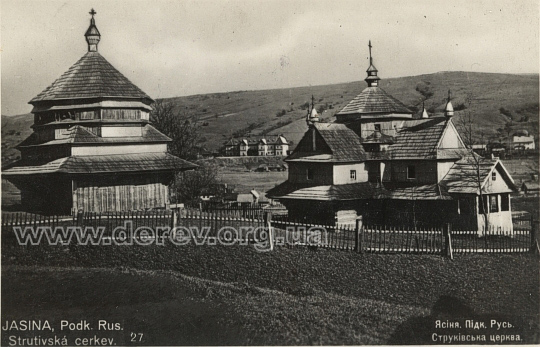
Postal card from the Carpathian Ruthenia era
