= Church of the Archangel Michael, Uzhok =

Uzhok-Tserkva of the Synaxis of the Archangel Michael
UNESCO World Heritage Site
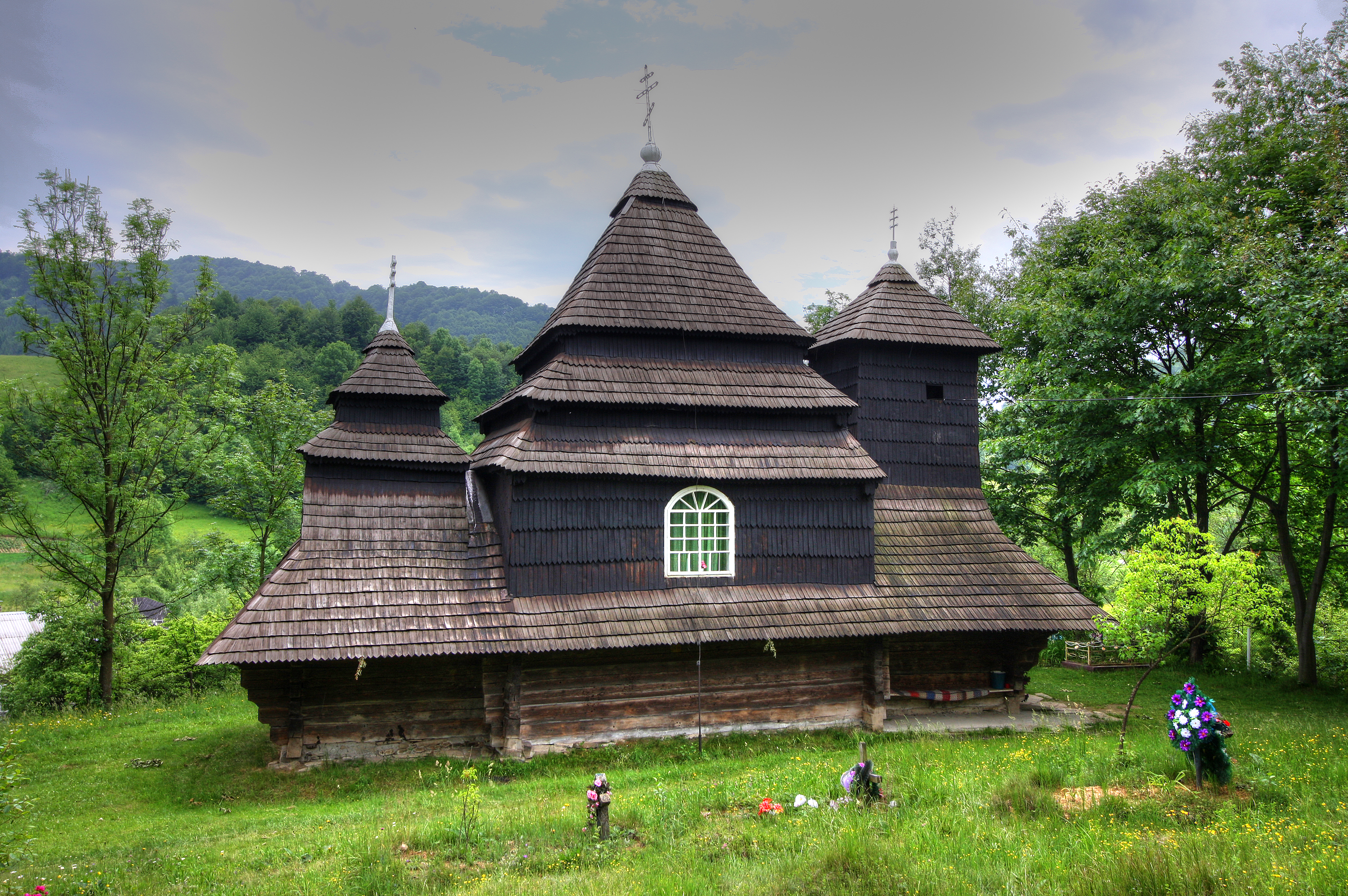

- Location within Zakarpattia Oblast Location within Ukraine
- Location: Uzhok, Uzhhorod Raion, Zakarpattia Oblast, Ukraine
- Part of: Wooden Tserkvas of the Carpathian Region in Poland and Ukraine
- Criteria: Cultural: (iii), (iv)
- Reference: 1424-014
- Inscription: 2013 (37th Session)
- Area: 0.12 ha (0.30 acres)
- Buffer zone: 1.81 ha (4.5 acres)
- Coordinates: 48°59′1.54″N 22°51′15.61″E

Immovable Monument of National Significance of Ukraine
- Official name: Церква Святого Архангела Михайла (Church of Saint Archangel Michael)
- Type: Architecture
- Reference no.: 070022

St. Michael Church is a church in a suburb of Uzhok, Ukraine, built in 1745. The structure consists of three wooden naves and a brick sacristy.

On June 21, 2013, at the 37th Session of the UNESCO World Heritage Committee, Church of the Archangel Michael, Uzhok was added as a UNESCO World Heritage Site. It was among 16 wooden tserkvas of Carpathian Region in Poland and Ukraine to be added.

== History ==
The churches of the upper reaches of the Uzh belong to the Boyko style and have numerous relatives in Lviv Oblast about fifty Boyko churches in the former Skole and Turka raions and several more in Ivano-Frankivsk Oblast and Poland, which is within easy reach from the Uzhok pass. However, the Transcarpathian churches create a kind of sub-style-the symmetry of the three domes with a dominant central one, characteristic of Boyko churches, is broken here. The top over the western part turns into a tower, and while in the Uzhok church the tower does not yet exceed the central tent, in the others it already rises. At the beginning of the twentieth century, such churches stood in almost every village along the upper reaches of the Uzh. Nowadays, five of them have been preserved, but three are mercilessly covered with tin.

According to legend, in ancient times Uzhok was a large settlement and had as many as seven mills, but after the plague spread throughout Europe, only one man remained in the village, who lived above the church. New settlers came from the neighboring Galician villages of Hnyla, Yavoriv, and Syanka. The church was built by master Pavlo Toniv from the neighboring village of Bitlia on the Lviv side of the Carpathians and master Ivan Tsyhanyn from the village of Tykhy. The builders finished the work on June 11, 1745. Other inscriptions on the log house add touches to the history of the church: "1895 Hyrych Petro curator weighed" (the church was being raised and the lower logs of the log cabins were replaced) and "Havrylko Vasyl curator" - apparently, this curator organized such a responsible repair work, and it was performed by the master Tsyhanyn from Tykhy (possibly a descendant of the church builder). It is said that the church was originally built high on a hillside, but old people found it difficult to climb up there, so the church was moved down the slope, almost to the road. The bishop's visitation of 1751 refers to a new church in Uzhok, equipped with all the books and two bells.

In Soviet times, the church was protected as an architectural monument of the Ukrainian SSR (#198). In 2018, the church was recognized as a cultural heritage site of national significance, which was included in the State Register of Immovable Monuments of Ukraine (No. 070022).

The Uzhok church has been extremely popular for about 100 years. Its photos have been published many times in periodicals, books, and booklets. Many Transcarpathian artists have dedicated their paintings to this outstanding monument, and its image adorned the bishop's chapel and the chapel of the teachers' seminary in Uzhhorod.

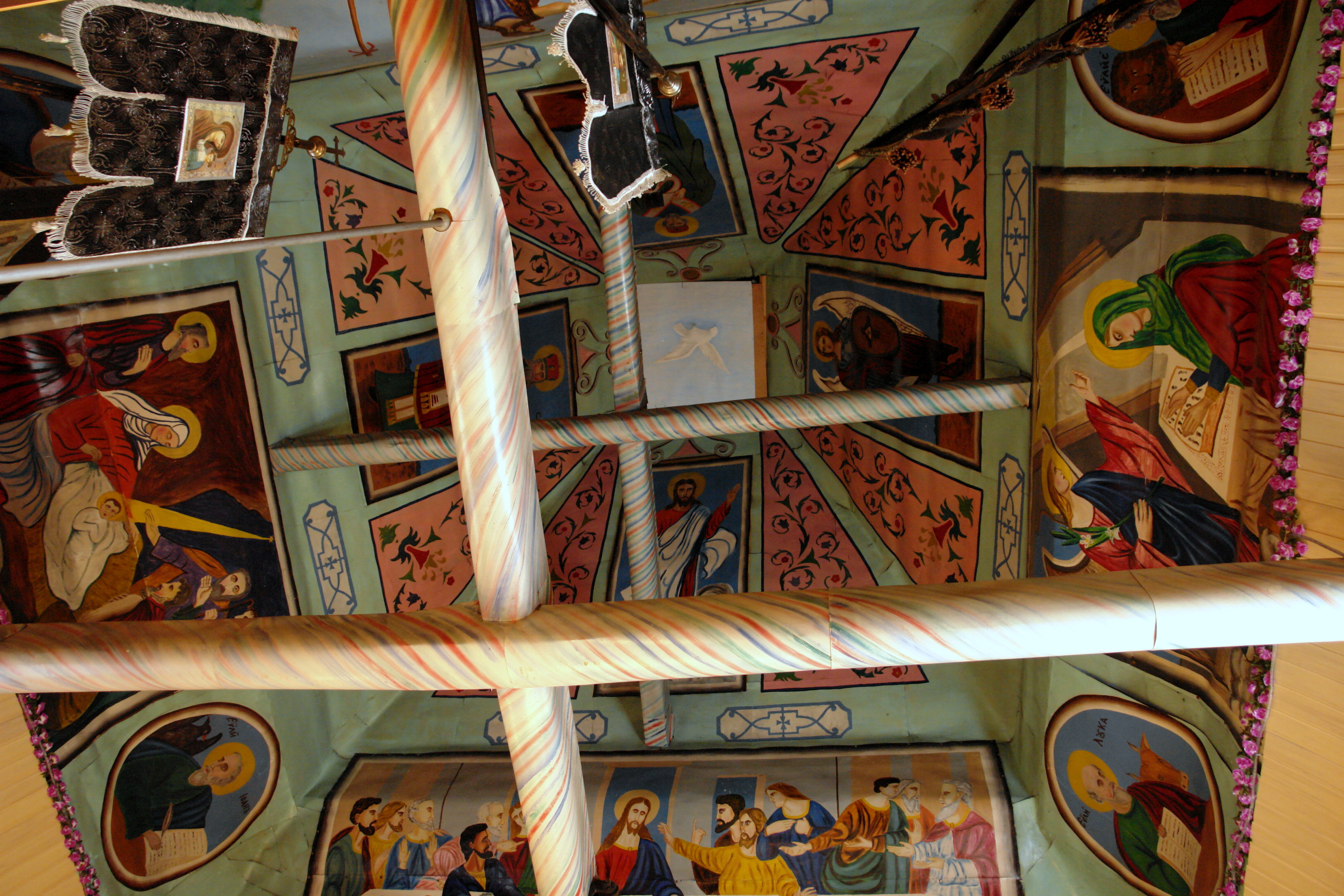
Nave

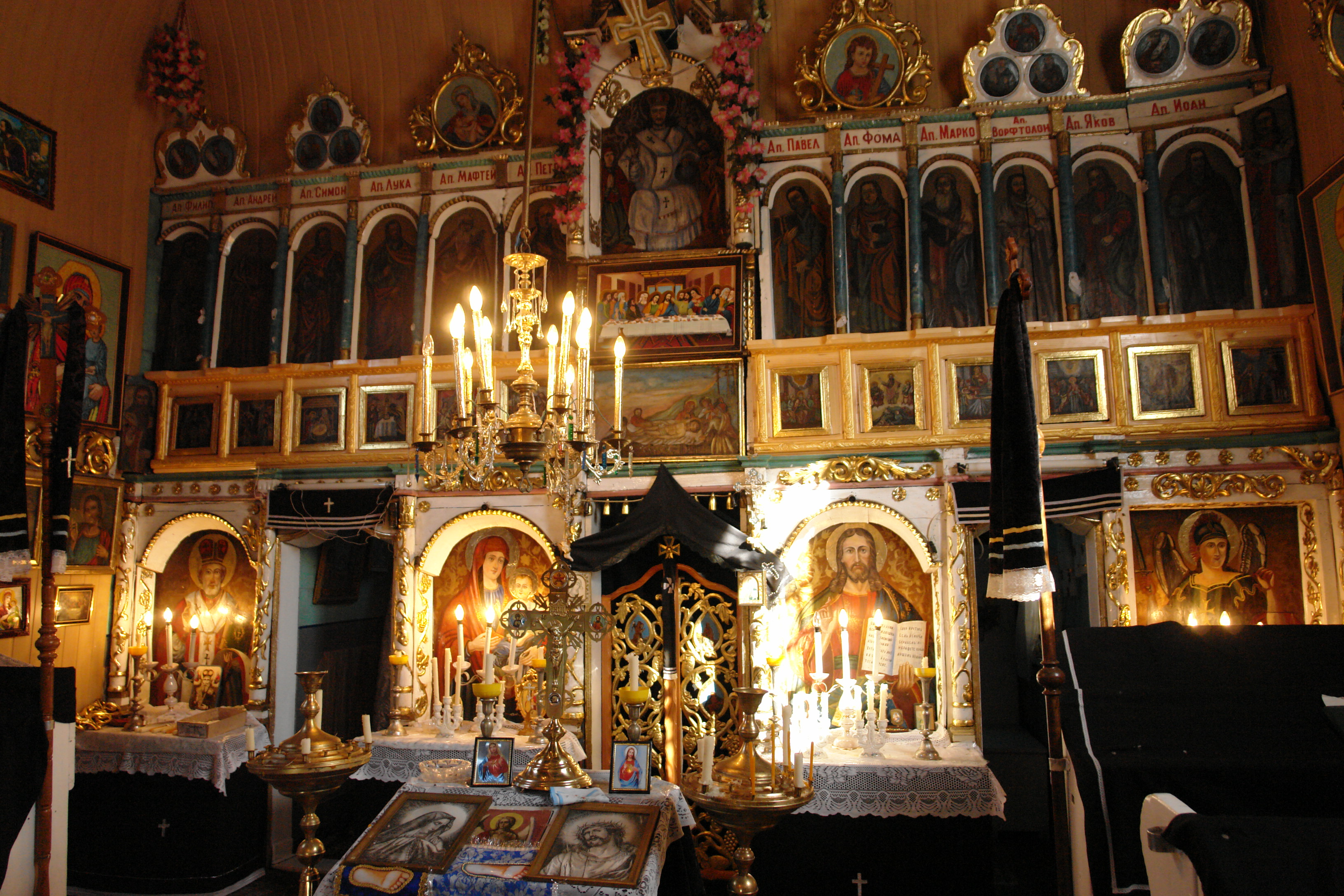
Iconostasis

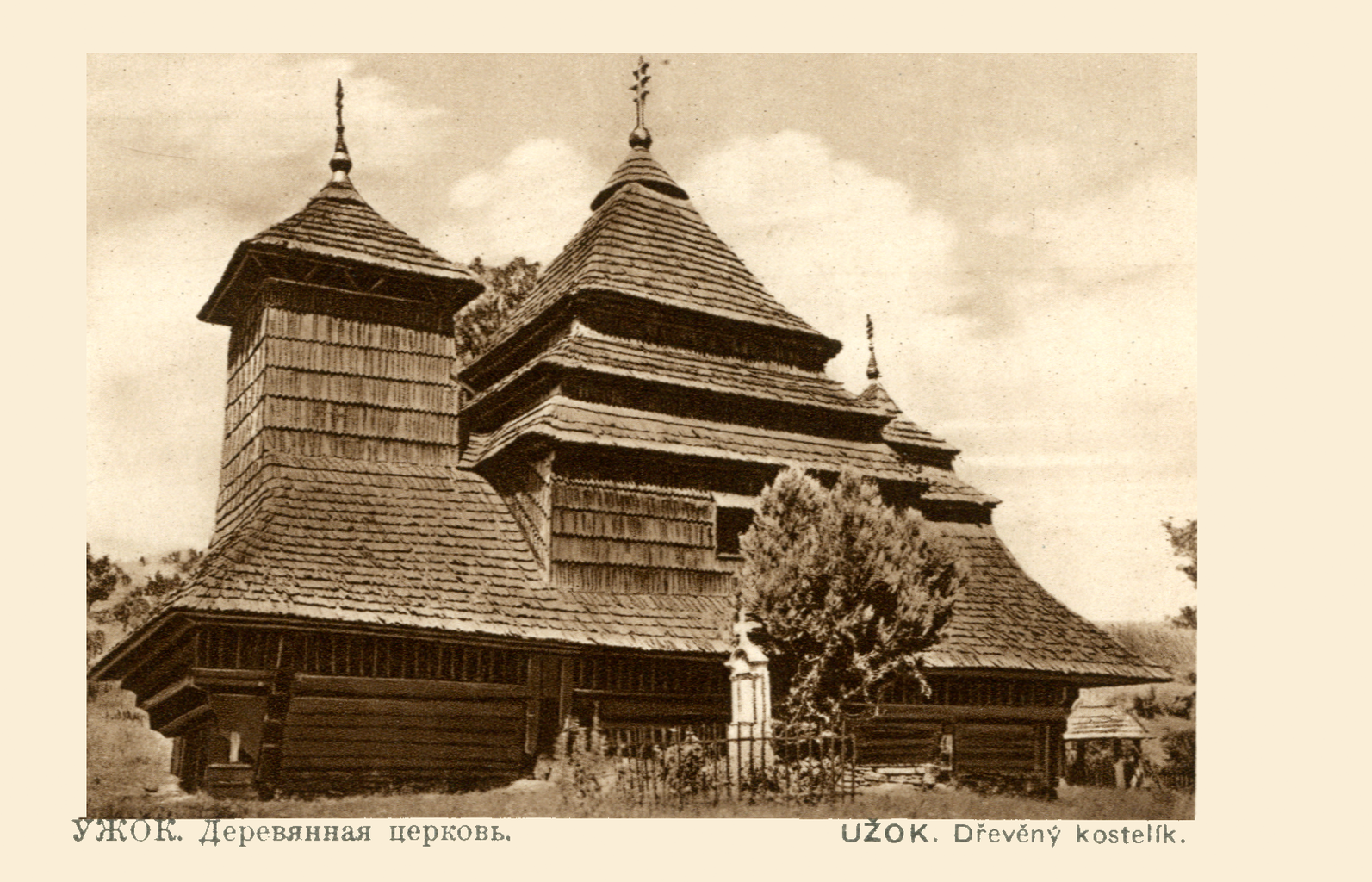
1919 photo
