= Mother of God Church, Chotyniec =

Coordinates: 49.9530°N 23.0026°E

Mother of God Church in Chotyniec
- Cerkiew Narodzenia Przenajświętszej Bogurodzicy w Chotyńcu
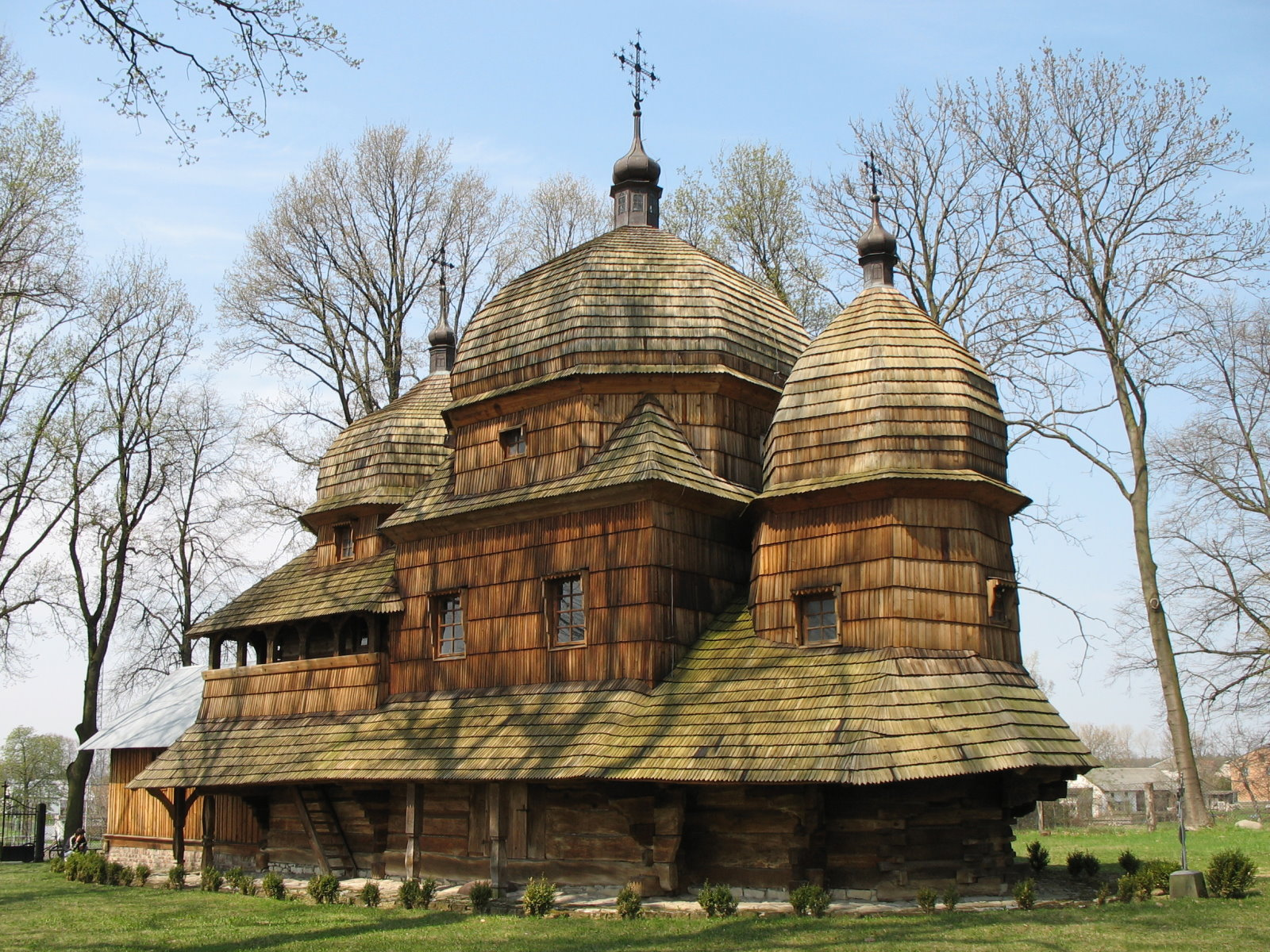
- Mother of God Church in Chotyniec
- Address: Chotyniec
- Country: Poland
- Denomination: Ukrainian Greek Catholic

History
- Status: active church

Architecture
- Style: Gothic
- Completed: c. 1600

Administration
- Diocese: Ukrainian Catholic Archeparchy of Przemyśl–Warsaw

UNESCO World Heritage Site
- Part of: Wooden Tserkvas of the Carpathian Region in Poland and Ukraine
- Criteria: Cultural: (iii), (iv)
- Reference: 1424-002
- Inscription: 2013 (37th Session)

Mother of God Church in Chotyniec is a Gothic wooden church located in the village of Chotyniec from the seventeenth-century, which together with different tserkvas is designated as part of the UNESCO Wooden tserkvas of the Carpathian region in Poland and Ukraine.

== History ==
The first document recording the existence of the tserkva originates from 1671. The tserkva is one of numerous active Ukrainian Greek Catholic Church tserkvas in Poland, which survived World War II and the subsequent Polish population transfers. The tserkva had undergone numerous renovations and was reconstructed in 1733, 1858, and 1925. After the 1947 Operation Vistula (displacement of Ukrainian minorities out of the Polish People's Republic), the tserkva was closed, and transformed into a Roman Catholic church. In the 1980s, the tserkva was closed due to its poor structural state. In 1990, the tserkva was taken back by its previous owner and re-transformed into a Ukrainian Greek Catholic Church tserkva. Between 1991 and 1994, the tserkva underwent a complex renovation, mainly by the help of the local parishioners.
