= Matkiv =

Village in Lviv Oblast, Ukraine

Matkiv Матків
- Village
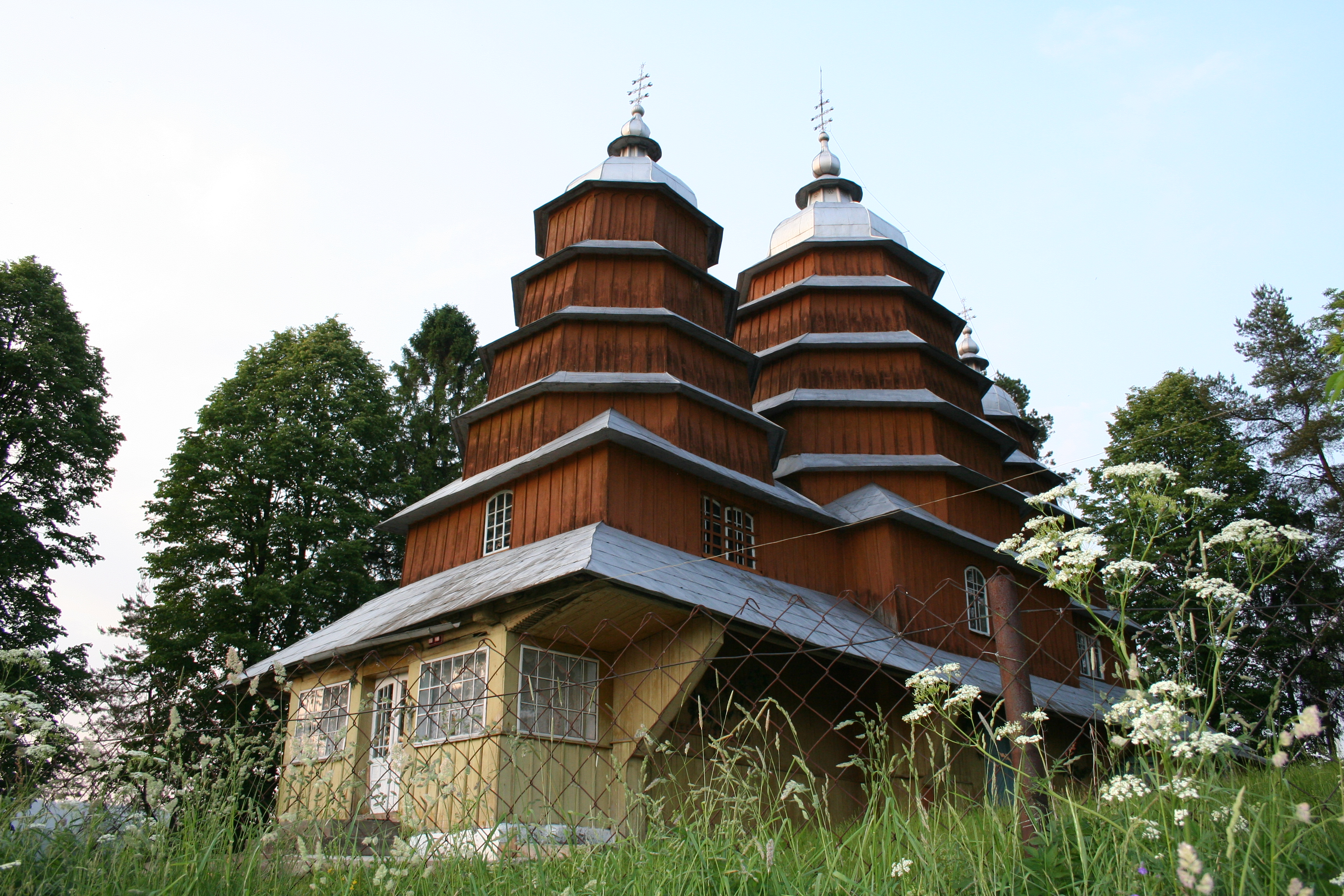
- St. Demetrius Church

- Location within Lviv Oblast
- Coordinates: 48°54′29″N 23°06′04″E
- Country: Ukraine
- Oblast: Lviv Oblast
- Raion: Stryi Raion
- Hromada: Kozova rural hromada

Area
  - Total: 12 km^{2} (4.6 sq mi)

Population
  - Total: 469
  - Density: 39/km^{2} (100/sq mi)

Matkiv (Ukrainian: Матків; Polish: Matków) is a village (selo) in Stryi Raion, Lviv Oblast, in south-west Ukraine. It belongs to Koziova rural hromada, one of the hromadas of Ukraine.

The village was probably established in the 15th century but was first mentioned in the first half of the 16th century. In the interwar period the village had around 1,500 inhabitants, 70% of them were Poles.

The village boasts the St. Demetrius Church, built in 1838, in 2013 inscribed on the UNESCO World Heritage List together with other wooden tserkvas of Carpathian region in Poland and Ukraine.

Until 18 July 2020, Matkiv belonged to Turka Raion. The raion was abolished in July 2020 as part of the administrative reform of Ukraine, which reduced the number of raions of Lviv Oblast to seven. The area of Turka Raion was merged into Sambir Raion, however, Matkiv was transferred to Stryi Raion.
