= St. Paraskevi Church, Kwiatoń =

Coordinates: 49.5009°N 21.1737°E

St. Paraskevi Church in Kwiatoń
- Cerkiew św. Paraskewy w Kwiatoniu
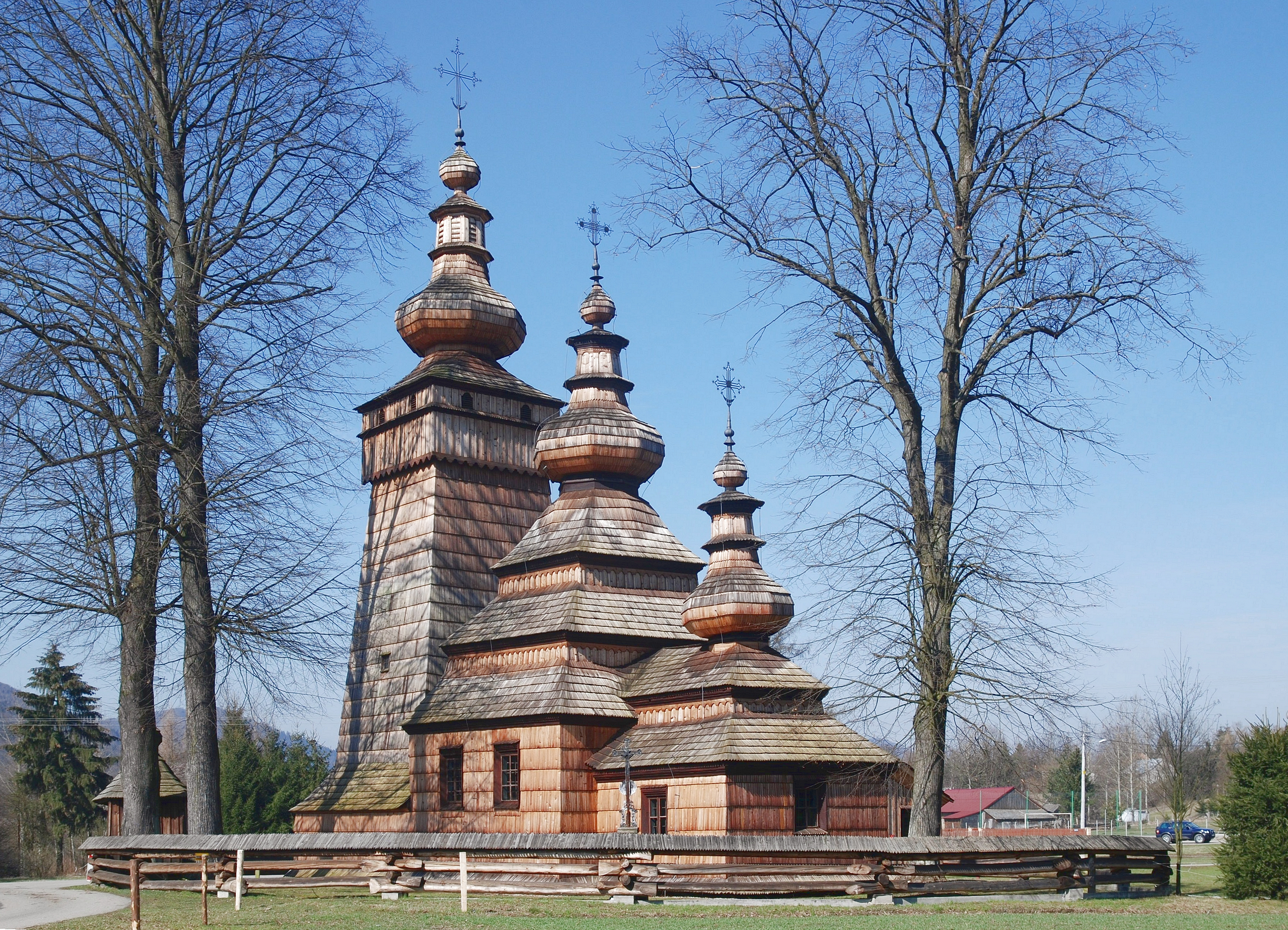
- St. Paraskevi Church in Kwiatoń
- Address: Kwiatoń
- Country: Poland
- Denomination: Roman Catholic Church

History
- Status: active church

Architecture
- Style: Gothic
- Completed: c. 1700

Administration
- Diocese: Roman Catholic Diocese of Tarnów

UNESCO World Heritage Site
- Part of: Wooden Tserkvas of the Carpathian Region in Poland and Ukraine
- Criteria: Cultural: (iii), (iv)
- Reference: 1424-004
- Inscription: 2013 (37th Session)

St. Paraskevi Church in Kwiatoń is a Gothic, wooden church located in the village of Kwiatoń from the nineteenth-century, which together with different tserkvas is designated as part of the UNESCO Wooden tserkvas of the Carpathian region in Poland and Ukraine.

== History ==
The tserkva was built in the second half of the seventeenth century as an Eastern Catholic church. The date of the completion of the tserkva was dated at 1700. The tower was built in 1743. The date for the completion of the tserkva was found on one of its wooden framework columns. However, this date could relate to the renovation of the old tower. The tserkva's tower is considered to be the oldest tower built in the Lemko church architectural style. After Operation Vistula in 1947, the tserkva was transformed into a Latin-rite Catholic church, belonging to the Uście Gorlickie parish.

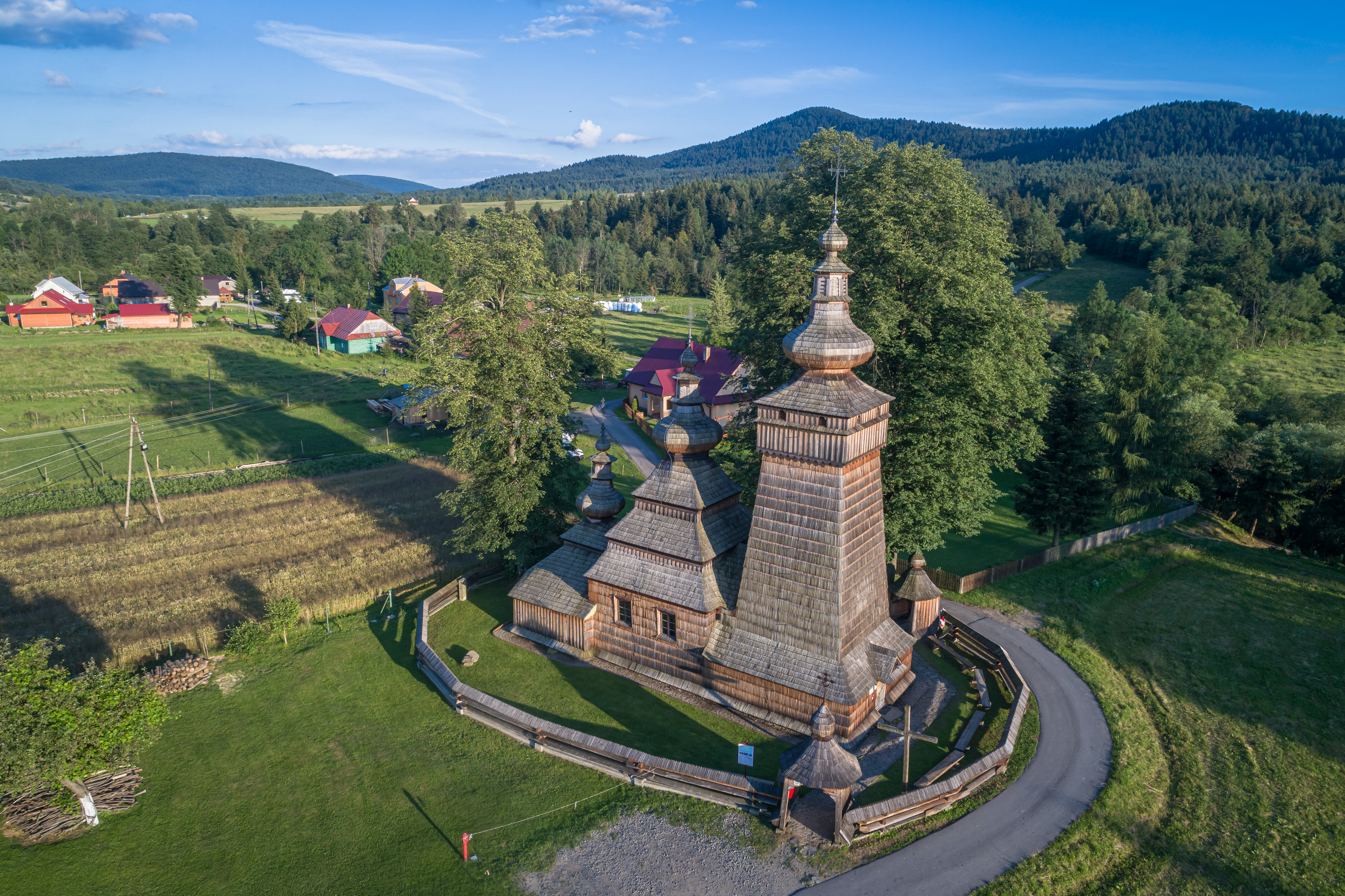
aerial view

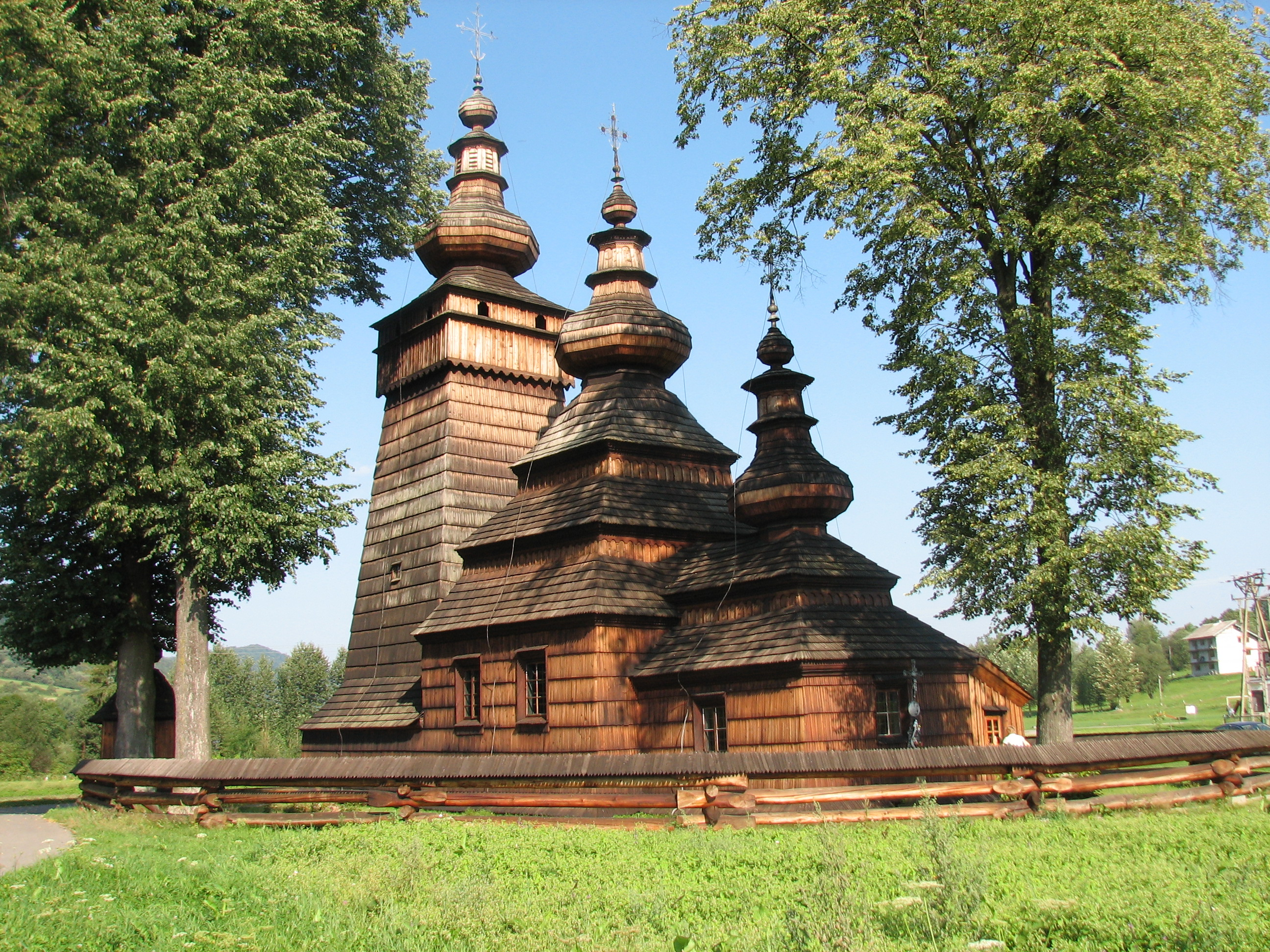
in summer

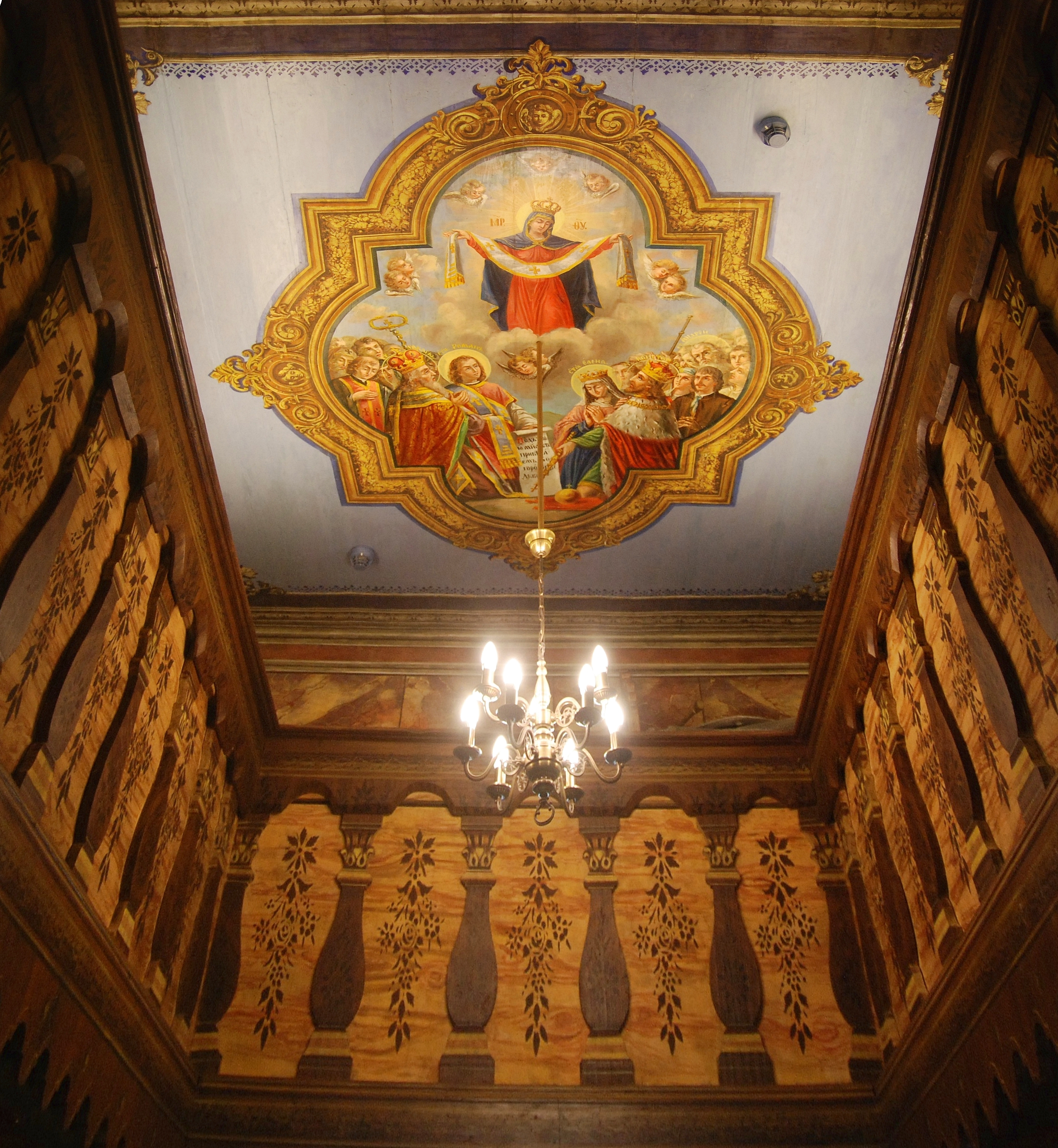
interior ceiling

== See also ==
- Paraskeva of the Balkans
