= Yasinia settlement hromada =

Settlement hromada in Zakarpattia Oblast, Ukraine

Yasinia settlement hromada Ясінянська селищна громада
- Hromada
- Location within Zakarpattia Oblast Location within Ukraine
- Coordinates: 48°16′22″N 24°22′29″E
- Country: Ukraine
- Oblast (province): Zakarpattia Oblast
- Raion (district): Rakhiv Raion

Area
  - Total: 528.6 km^{2} (204.1 sq mi)

Population (2023)
  - Total: 18,348
- Website: yasinya-gromada.gov.ua

Yasinia settlement territorial hromada (Ukrainian: Ясінянська селищна територіальна громада, romanized: Yasinianska selyshchna terytorialna hromada) is a hromada of Ukraine, located in Rakhiv Raion within Zakarpattia Oblast. Its capital is the urban-type settlement of Yasinia.

The hromada has an area of 528.6 km^{2} (204.1 mi^{2}), as well as a population of 18,348 (as of 2023).

== Composition ==
In addition to one urban-type settlement (Yasinia), the hromada contains six villages:

- Chorna Tysa
- Kvasy
- Lazeshchyna
- Sitnyi
- Stebnyi
- Trostianets

== Geography ==
Yasinyansk settlement territorial community is located in the Ukrainian Carpathians, in the north of Rakhiv district, in the upper part of the Tisza valley. The community is located entirely in the Yasinyanska mountain basin, and its border runs along the Svydovets and Chornohora mountains. The relief of the highlands shows signs of ancient glaciation - cirque and trough valleys.

The area of the district is 528.6 km^{2}.

The climate in Yasinyansk settlement territorial community is moderately continental. The average temperature in January is -4.8 °C, in July - +18.0 °C, the average annual temperature is 7.4 °C. The average annual precipitation is 1212 mm, the maximum of which falls on June-July. With increasing altitude above sea level, the air temperature decreases and the amount of precipitation increases.

The Black Tisza, a left tributary of the Tisza River (Danube basin), begins in the Yasinyansk settlement community.

The Carpathian Biosphere Reserve is located in the Rakhiv district. The unique virgin forests and high-altitude meadows of this reserve belong to the most valuable ecosystems on the planet and are part of the UNESCO International Network of Biosphere Reserves. This territory is home to large predators such as the bear, wolf, and lynx.

== Transport ==
The national highway H-09 passes through the territory of the community, which begins in the city of Mukachevo, passes through the community and ends in the city of Lviv. Also, a railway line has been laid through the territory of the community, which passes through the settlements of the Yasinyansk territorial community to Kyiv, Odessa, and Dnipro.
