= Kwiatoń =

- Village
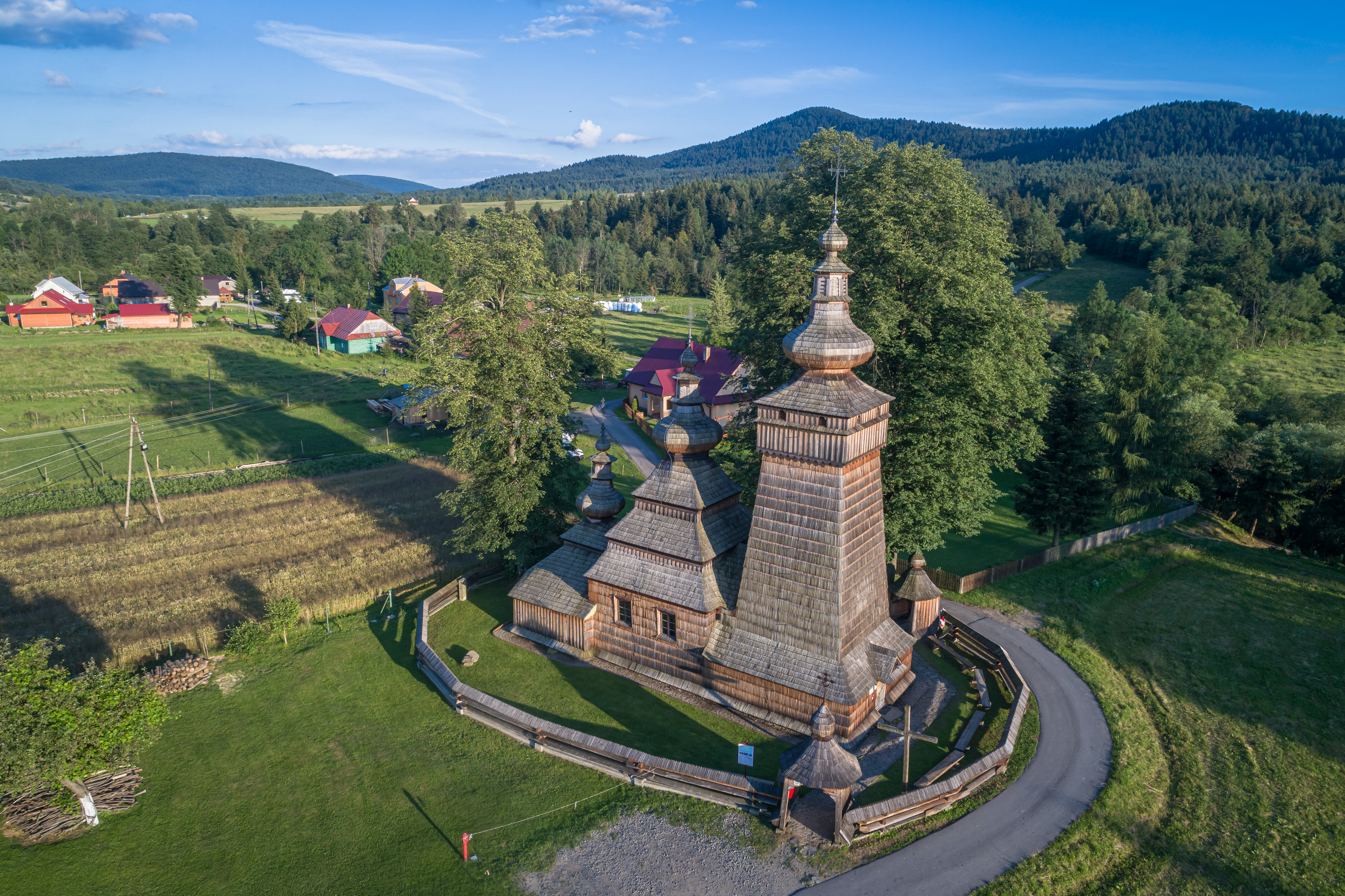
- The 17th century Lemko Greek Catholic church

- Location within Poland
- Coordinates: 49°30′06″N 21°10′25″E
- Country: Poland
- Voivodeship: Lesser Poland
- County: Gorlice
- Gmina: Uście Gorlickie
- Population: 200

Kwiatoń [ˈkfʲatɔɲ] is a village in the administrative district of Gmina Uście Gorlickie, within Gorlice County, Lesser Poland Voivodeship, in southern Poland, close to the border with Slovakia.
