= Yasinia =

Rural locality in Zakarpattia Oblast, Ukraine

Yasinia Ясіня Körösmező • Jasiňa • Frasin
- Rural settlement
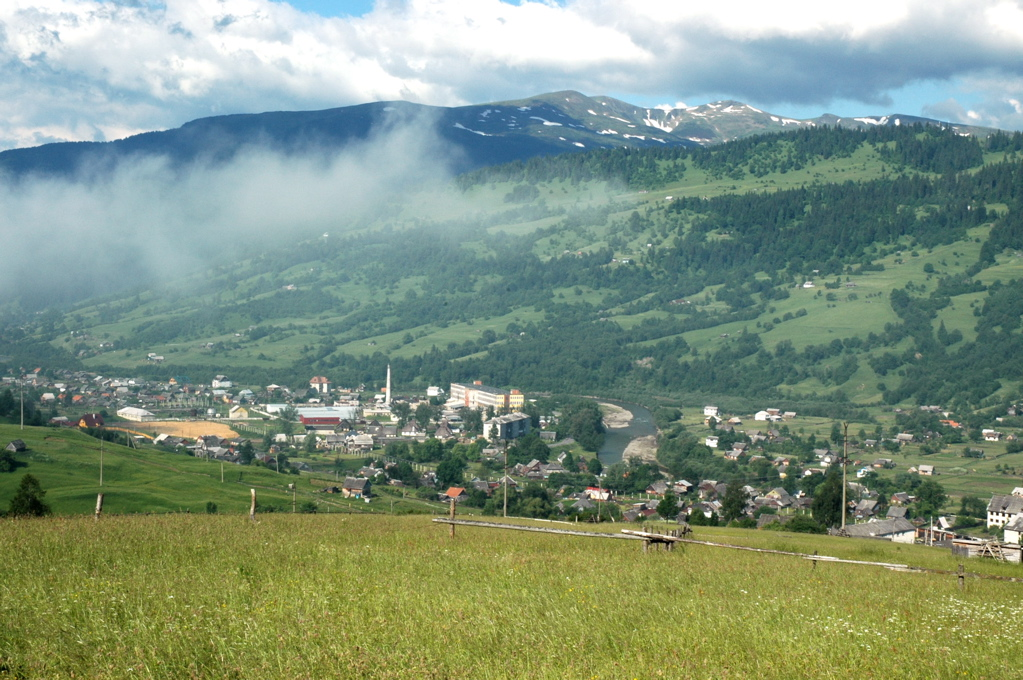

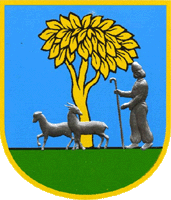
- Coat of arms
- Motto: ->
- Interactive map of Yasinia
- Location within Zakarpattia Oblast Location within Ukraine
- Coordinates: 48°16′20″N 24°21′40″E
- Country: Ukraine
- Oblast: Zakarpattia Oblast
- Raion: Rakhiv Raion
- Hromada: Yasinia settlement hromada
- Established: 1535

Area
  - Total: 1.46 km^{2} (0.56 sq mi)
- Elevation: 931 m (3,054 ft)

Population (2022)
  - Total: 8,565 (2022 estimate)
  - Density: 5,866/km^{2} (15,190/sq mi)
- Time zone: UTC+2 (EET)
  - Summer (DST): UTC+3 (EEST)
- Postal code: 90630
- Area code: +380 3132
- KOATUU: 2123656200
- KATOTTH: UA21060070010074038

Yasinia (Ukrainian: Ясіня, Ukrainian pronunciation: [jɐsʲiˈnʲɑ], local pronunciation: [jɐsʲiˈnʲɐ]; Hungarian: Körösmező; Slovak: Jasiňa; Romanian: Frasin) is a rural settlement in Rakhiv Raion, Zakarpattia Oblast, Ukraine. Population: 8,565 (2022 estimate).

== History ==
It was the site of the Hutsul Republic after World War I, and the birthplace of several prominent Ukrainians declaring independence from the Kingdom of Hungary. This republic was ended by Romanian troops on June 11, 1919. Yasinia ultimately passed to Czechoslovakia according to the Treaty of Trianon. From 1919 to 1939, it was its easternmost settlement. Hungary again occupied and annexed it as part of Carpathian Ruthenia in 1939 and held it until the end of World War II. It was given to the Soviet Union in 1945.

Until 26 January 2024, Yasinia was designated urban-type settlement. On this day, a new law entered into force which abolished this status, and Yasinia became a rural settlement.

The wooden church in Yasinia appears on several stamps of the area, including the first stamp of Carpatho-Ukraine.

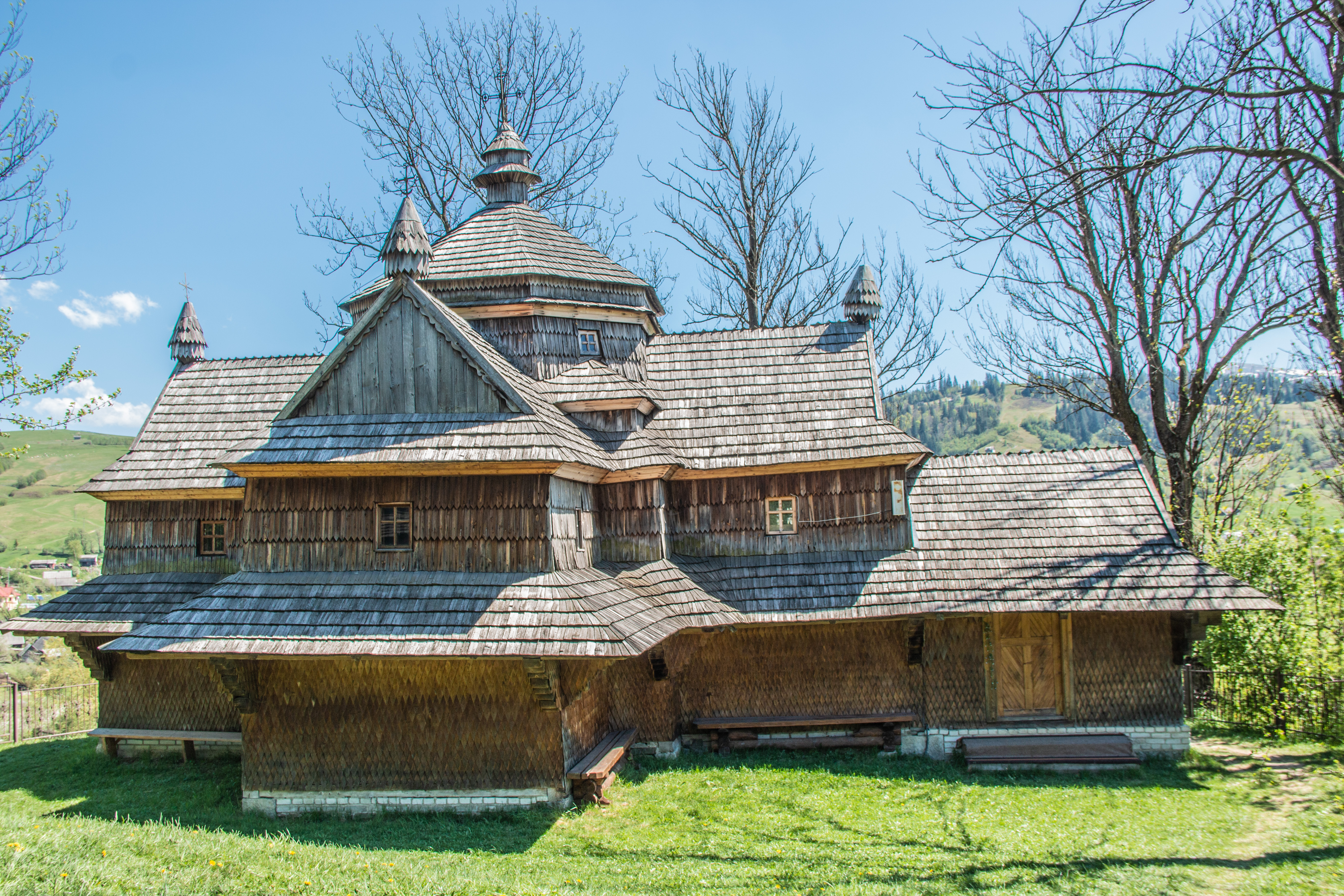
The wooden church at Yasinia

== Demographics ==
Historical population
Year	Pop.	±%
1959	6,846	—
1970	7,372	+7.7%
1979	7,574	+2.7%
1989	7,720	+1.9%
2001	8,006	+3.7%
2011	8,308	+3.8%
2022	8,565	+3.1%

As of the 2001 Ukrainian census, Yasinia had a population of 8,043. The linguistic composition of the settlement was as follows:

Native languages in Yasinia
	percent
Ukrainian	89.5%
Hungarian	8.2%
Romani	1.2%
Russian	0.8%
Belarusian	0.1%
others	0.1%

== Notable people ==
- Daniel Ivancho (1908-1972), American bishop of the Greek Catholic Church
- Stepan Klochurak (1895-1980), Ukrainian politician and Prime Minister of the Hutsul Republic
- Orest Klympush (born 1941), Ukrainian politician
- Ivan Kovbasnyuk (born 1993), Ukrainian skier
