= Radruż =

- Village
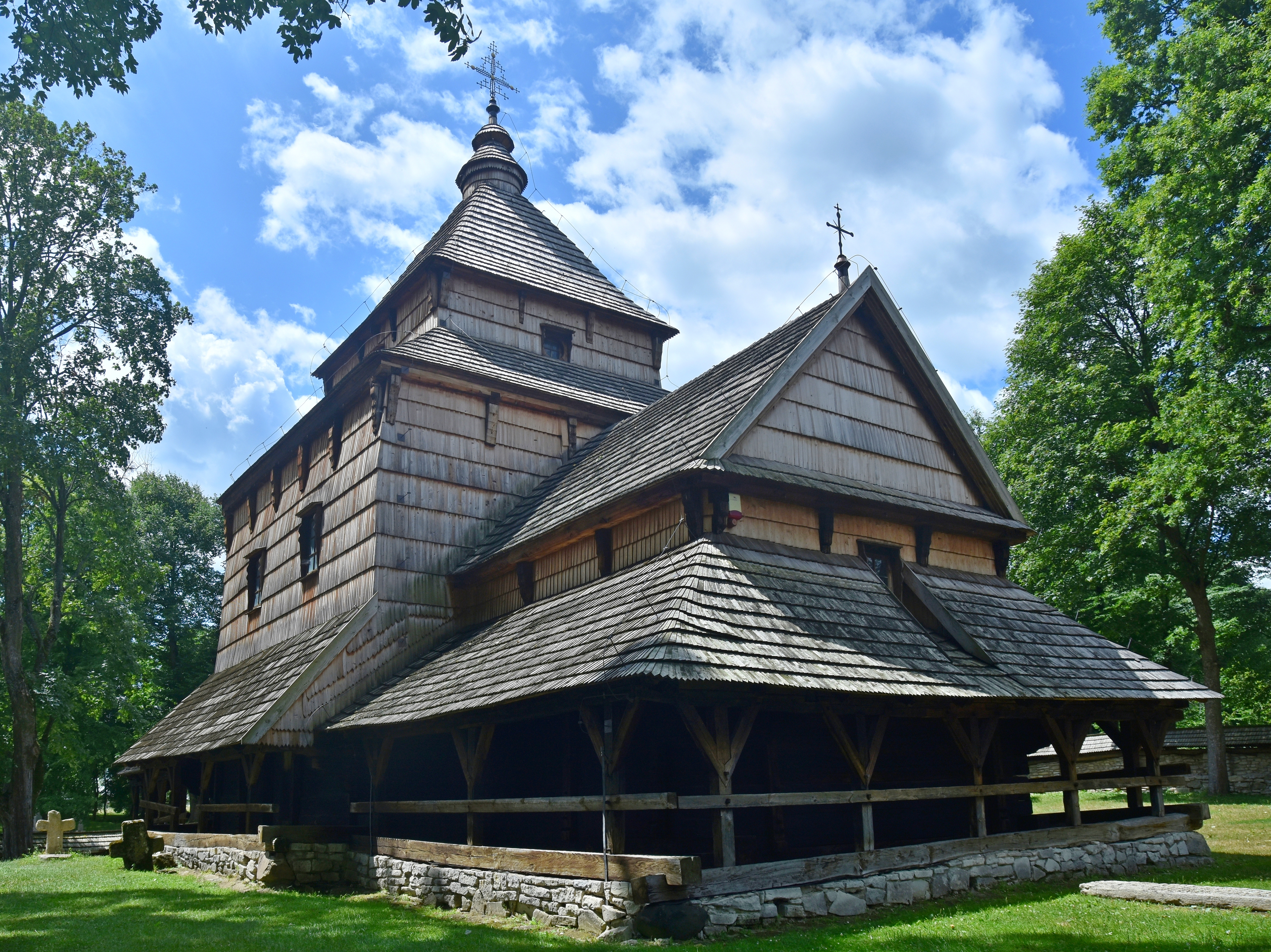
- St. Paraskevi Church, Radruż

- Location within Poland
- Coordinates: 50°10′27″N 23°23′58″E
- Country: Poland
- Voivodeship: Subcarpathian
- County: Lubaczów
- Gmina: Horyniec-Zdrój

Population
  - Total: 260
- Time zone: UTC+1 (CET)
  - Summer (DST): UTC+2 (CEST)
- Vehicle registration: RLU

Radruż [ˈradruʂ] is a village in the administrative district of Gmina Horyniec-Zdrój, within Lubaczów County, Subcarpathian Voivodeship, in south-eastern Poland, close to the border with Ukraine.

The local landmark is the St. Paraskevi Church, a UNESCO World Heritage Site and Historic Monument of Poland.

Five Polish citizens were murdered by Nazi Germany in the village during World War II.
