= Powroźnik =

- Village
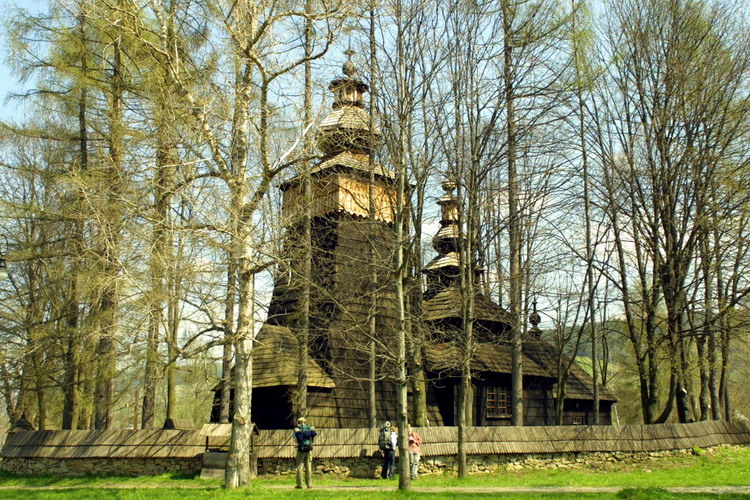
- Wooden Orthodox church from 1604

- Location within Poland
- Coordinates: 49°22′15″N 20°57′01″E
- Country: Poland
- Voivodeship: Lesser Poland
- County: Nowy Sącz
- Gmina: Muszyna
- Population: 1,300

Powroźnik [pɔˈvrɔʑɲik] is a village in the administrative district of Gmina Muszyna, within Nowy Sącz County, Lesser Poland Voivodeship, in southern Poland, close to the border with Slovakia.
