= Owczary, Gorlice County =

Owczary
- Village
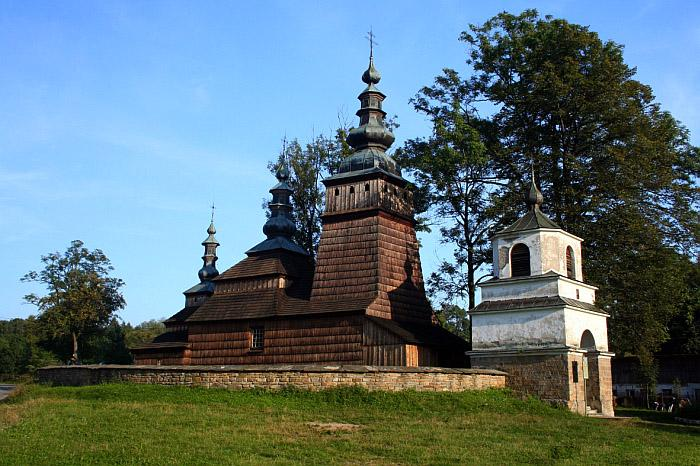
- Greek Catholic church

- Location within Poland
- Coordinates: 49°35′N 21°11′E
- Country: Poland
- Voivodeship: Lesser Poland
- County: Gorlice
- Gmina: Sękowa

Owczary [ɔfˈt͡ʂarɨ] (Ukrainian: Рихвальд, Rykhvald) is a village in the administrative district of Gmina Sękowa, within Gorlice County, Lesser Poland Voivodeship, in southern Poland, close to the border with Slovakia.

In Owczary is buried the Polish resistance fighter, Maria Kotarba.
