= Bilingual municipalities in Poland =

Polish municipalities with a second official language

The bilingual status of gminas (municipalities) in Poland is regulated by the Act of 6 January 2005 on National and Ethnic Minorities and on the Regional Languages, which permits certain gminas with significant linguistic minorities to introduce a second, auxiliary language to be used in official contexts alongside Polish. So far 44 gminas have done this:

== German ==
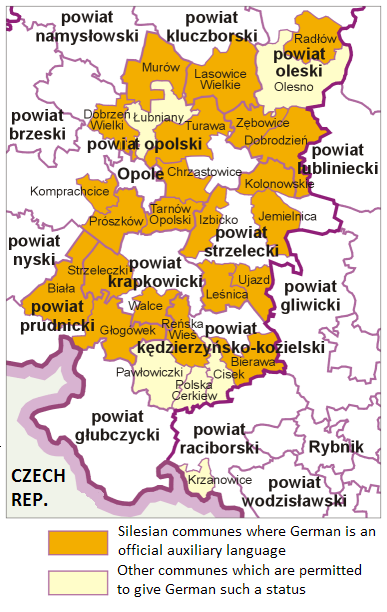
German language as auxiliary language in 22 municipalities in Opole and Silesia Voivodeships (slightly outdated map from 2010)

Polish/German bilingual gminas (Gemeinden) in

- Opole Voivodeship (28 municipalities)
  - Gmina Biała / Gemeinde Zülz (since 06.03.2006)
  - Gmina Bierawa / Gemeinde Birawa (since 23.04.2007)
  - Gmina Chrząstowice / Gemeinde Chronstau (since 25.01.2006)
  - Gmina Cisek / Gemeinde Czissek
  - Gmina Dobrodzień / Gemeinde Guttentag (since 13.05.2009)
  - Gmina Dobrzeń Wielki / Gemeinde Groß Döbern (since 22.04.2009)
  - Gmina Głogówek / Gemeinde Oberglogau (since 22.04.2009)
  - Gmina Gogolin / Gemeinde Gogolin
  - Gmina Izbicko / Gemeinde Stubendorf (since 06.03.2006)
  - Gmina Jemielnica / Gemeinde Himmelwitz (since 28.08.2006)
  - Gmina Kolonowskie / Gemeinde Colonnowska (since 22.09.2006)
  - Gmina Komprachcice / Gemeinde Comprachtschütz (since 04.06.2009)
  - Gmina Lasowice Wielkie / Gemeinde Gross Lassowitz (since 18.10.2006)
  - Gmina Leśnica / Gemeinde Leschnitz (since 17.05.2006)
  - Gmina Łubniany / Gemeinde Lugnian
  - Gmina Murów / Gemeinde Murow (since 22.04.2009)
  - Gmina Pawłowiczki / Gemeinde Gnadenfeld
  - Gmina Polska Cerekiew / Gemeinde Groß Neukirch
  - Gmina Popielów / Gemeinde Poppelau
  - Gmina Prószków / Gemeinde Proskau (since 11.07.2006)
  - Gmina Radłów / Gemeinde Radlau (since 25.01.2006)
  - Gmina Reńska Wieś / Gemeinde Reinschdorf (since 26.10.2006)
  - Gmina Strzeleczki / Gemeinde Klein Strehlitz (since 17.05.2006)
  - Gmina Tarnów Opolski / Gemeinde Tarnau (since 15.02.2007)
  - Gmina Turawa / Gemeinde Turawa (since 12.09.2008)
  - Gmina Ujazd / Gemeinde Ujest (since 28.08.2006)
  - Gmina Walce / Gemeinde Walzen (since 04.04.2006)
  - Gmina Zębowice / Gemeinde Zembowitz (since 23.10.2007)
- Silesian Voivodeship (3 municipalities)
  - Gmina Krzanowice / Gemeinde Kranowitz
  - Gmina Rudnik / Gemeinde Rudnik
  - Gmina Sośnicowice / Gemeinde Kieferstädtel

Other gminas in Opole Voivodeship and Silesian Voivodeship which would be permitted by the Act to make German an auxiliary language are Olesno and Pawłowiczki.

== Kashubian ==
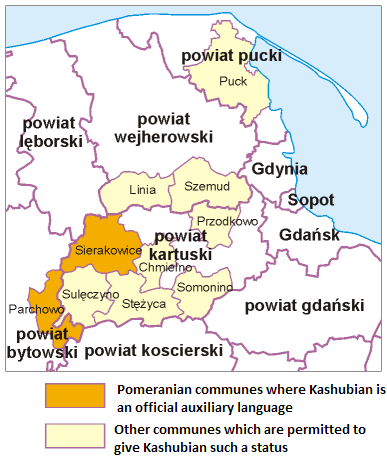

Polish/Kashubian bilingual gminas in Pomeranian Voivodeship:

- Gmina Linia (Gmina Lëniô; since 23.04.2012)
- Gmina Luzino (Gmina Lëzëno; since 21.02.2014)
- Gmina Parchowo (Gmina Parchòwò; since 16.08.2006)
- Gmina Sierakowice (Gmina Serakòwice; since 23.10.2007)
- Gmina Żukowo (Gmina Żukòwò; since 17.07.2013)

== Lithuanian ==
Polish/Lithuanian bilingual gmina in Podlaskie Voivodeship:

- Gmina Puńsk (Punsko valsčius; since 25 May 2006)

== Belarusian ==
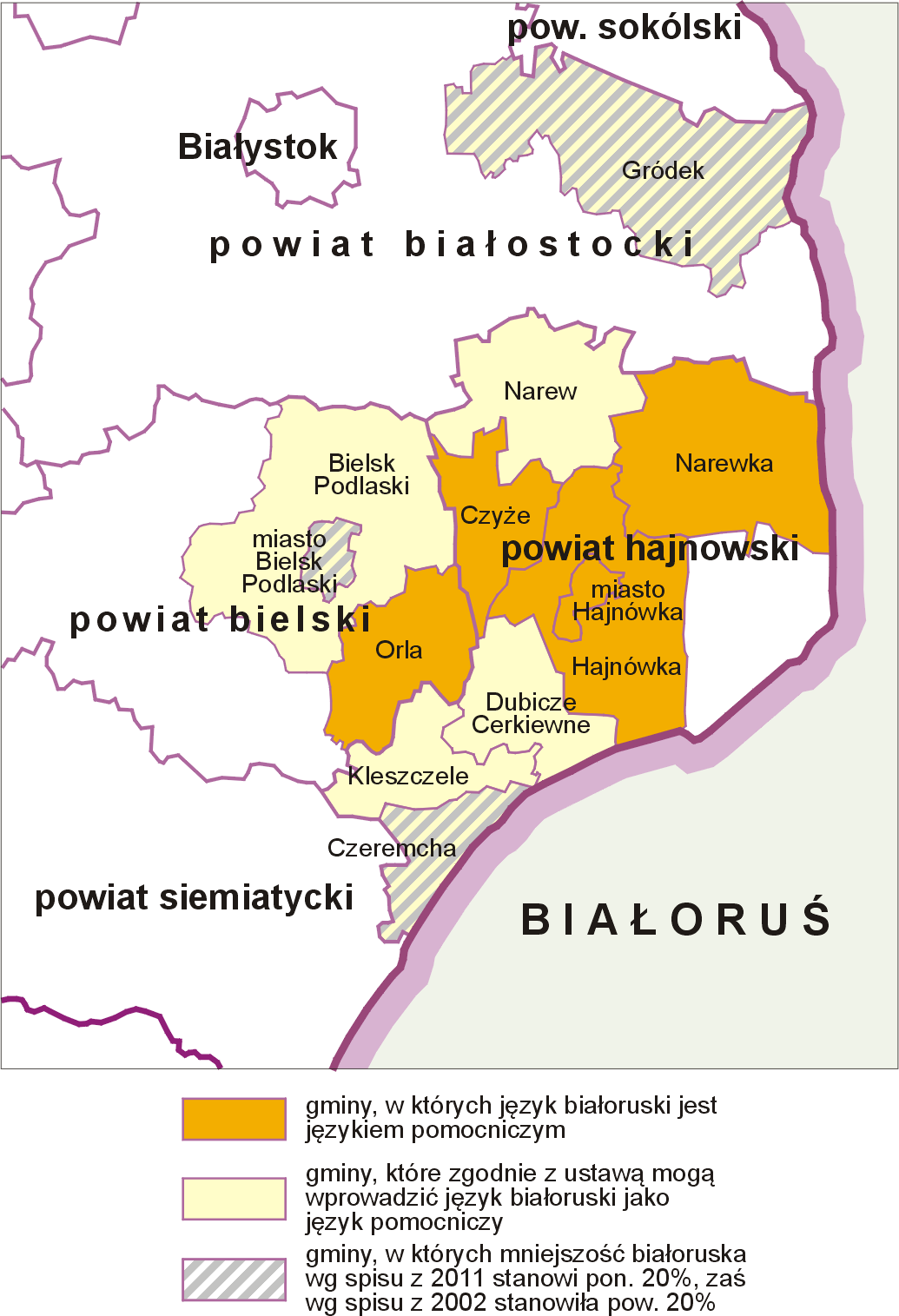

Polish/Belarusian bilingual gminas in Podlaskie Voivodeship:

- Hajnówka-urban gmina (Гайнаўка) on 3 December 2007
- Gmina Czyże (Гміна Чыжы) on 8 February 2010
- Gmina Hajnówka-rural gmina (Гміна Гайнаўка) on 28 May 2010
- Gmina Narewka (Гміна Нараўка) on 16 September 2009
- Gmina Orla (Гміна Орля) on 7 May 2009

== Lemko ==
Polish/Lemko bilingual names of localities in Małopolskie Voivodeship:

- Gmina Gorlice: Bielanka
- Gmina Uście Gorlickie: Blechnarka, Gładyszów, Konieczna, Kunkowa, Nowica, Regietów, Ropki, Zdynia

== Gallery ==
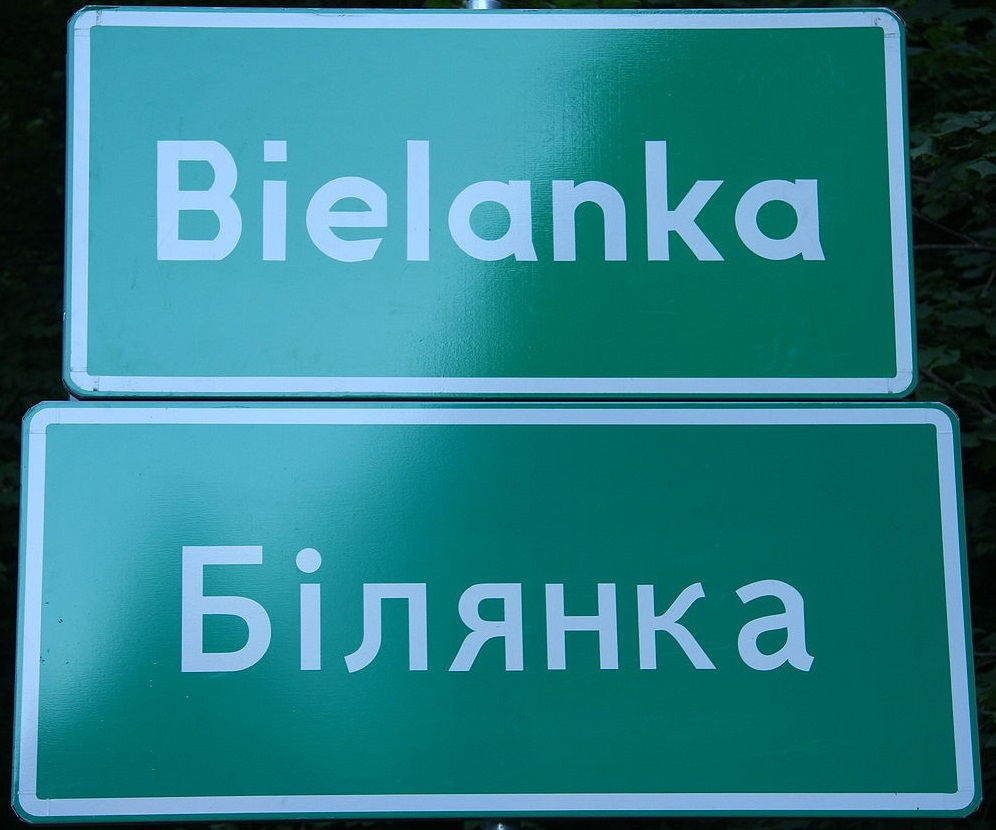
Polish/Lemko place-name sign in Bielanka

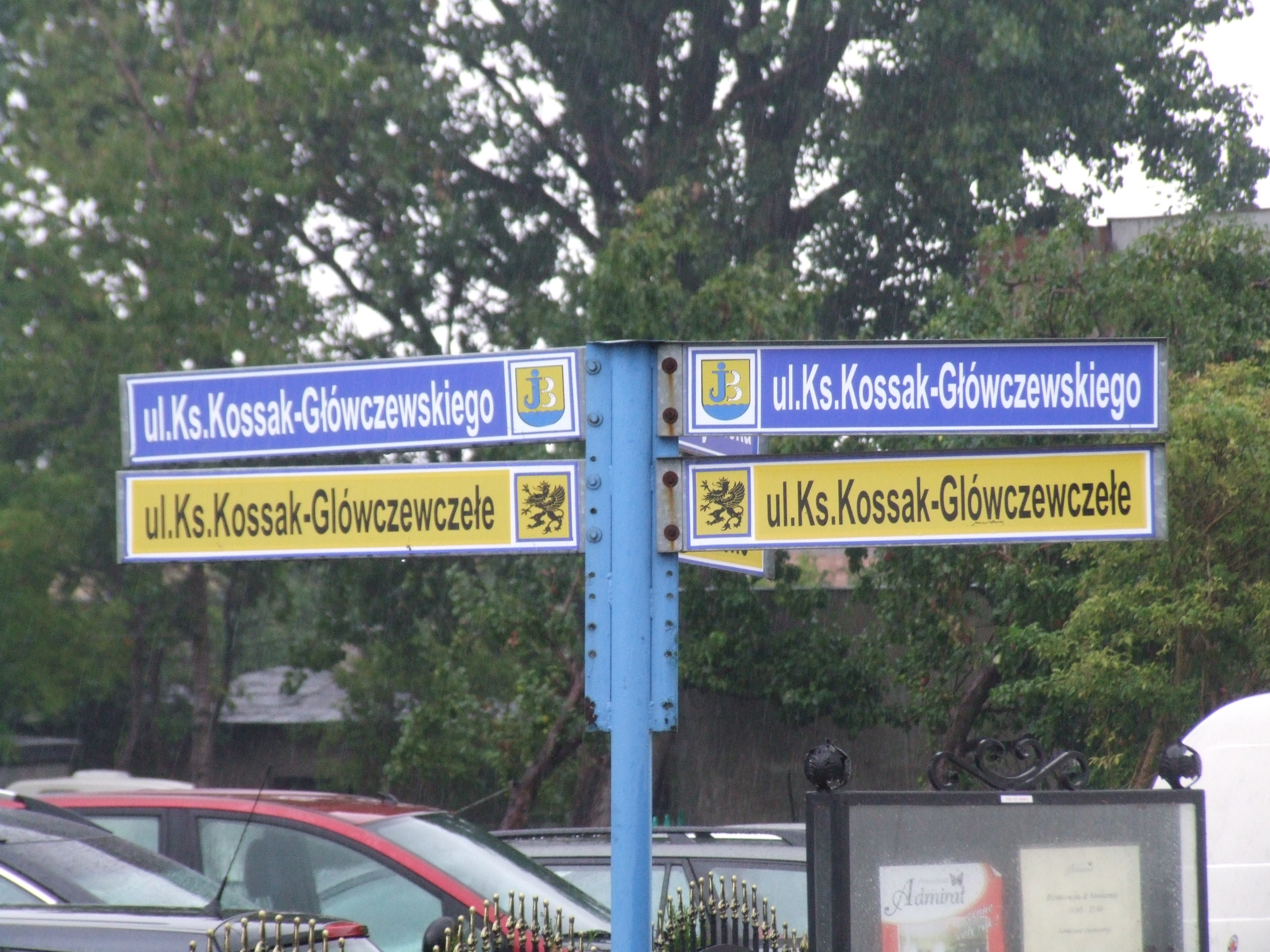
Polish/Kashubian street name sign in Jastarnia

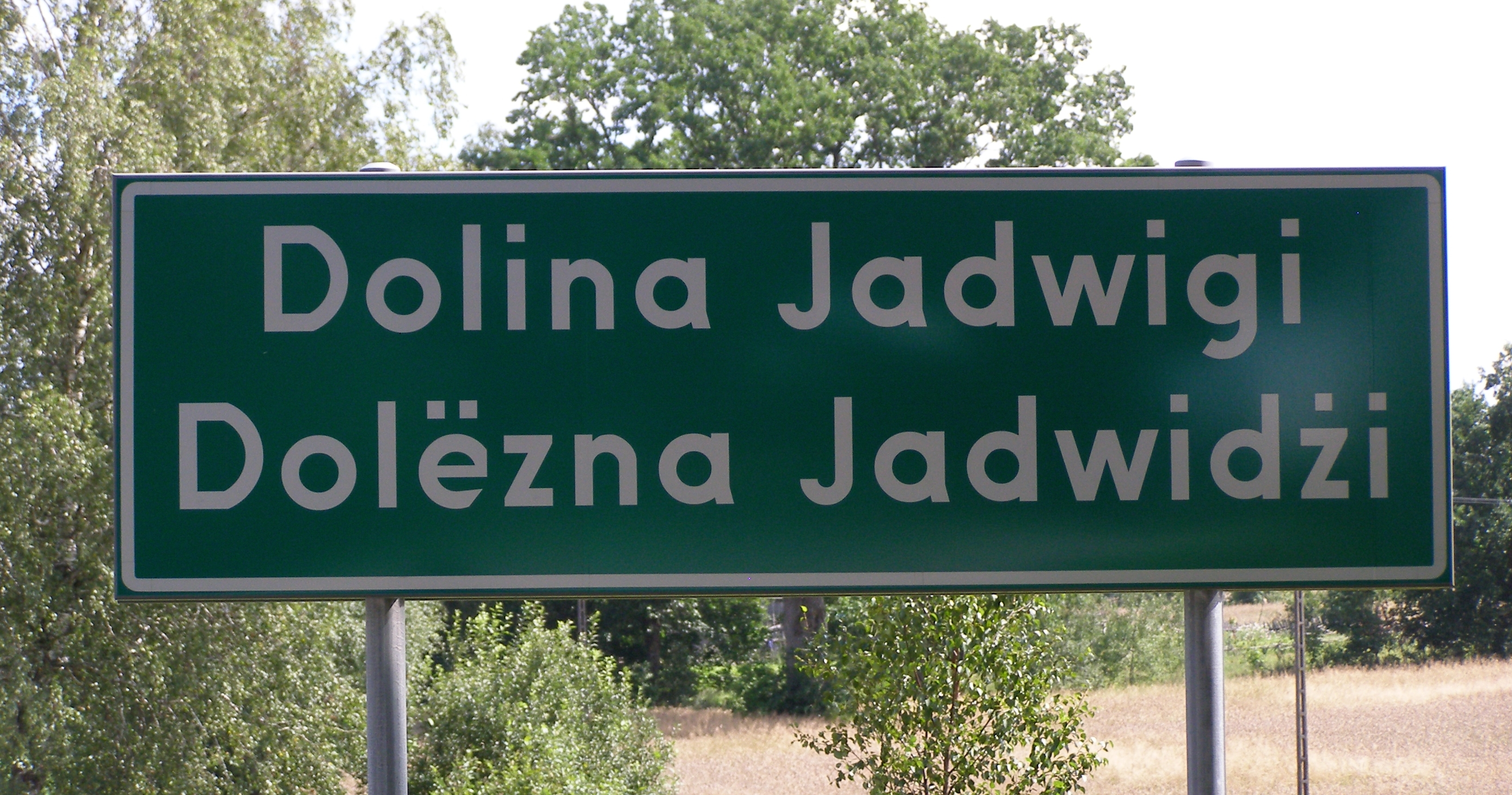
Polish/Kashubian road sign with the village name (Dolina Jadwigi)

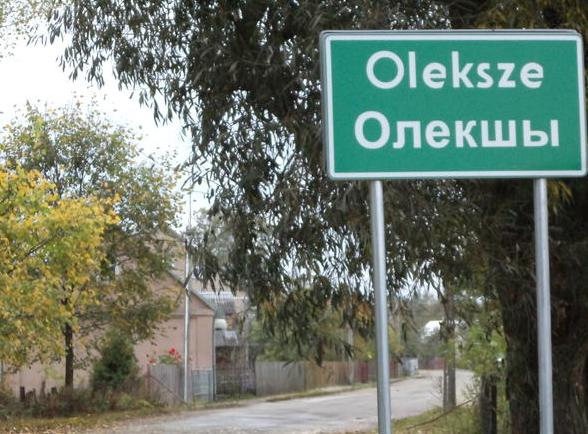
Bilingual Polish/Belarusian sign in Oleksze

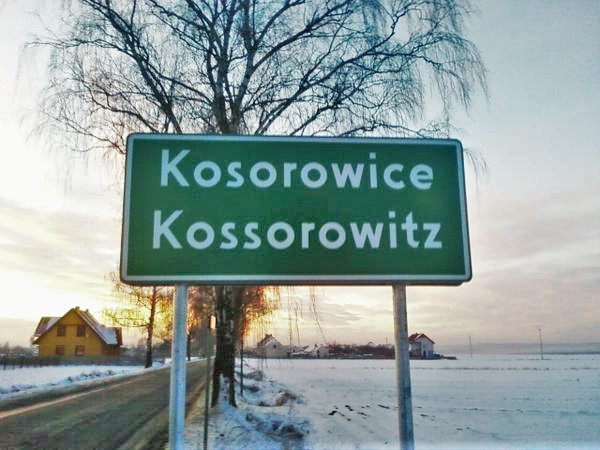
Polish/German place-name sign in Kosorowice
