= Zdynianka =

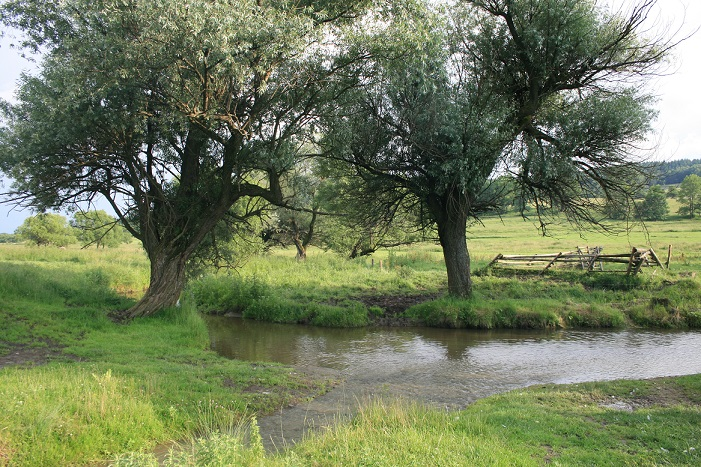

Location
- Country: Poland

Physical characteristics
- Mouth
  - location: Ropa
  - coordinates: 49°31′18″N 21°08′33″E

Basin features
- Progression: Ropa→ Wisłoka→ Vistula→ Baltic Sea

Zdynianka is a river of Poland, a tributary of the Ropa. Its source is near the village Konieczna, near the border with Slovakia. It flows through the villages Zdynia, Smerekowiec and Kwiatoń, joins the Ropa in Uście Gorlickie.
