= Hańczowa =

- Village
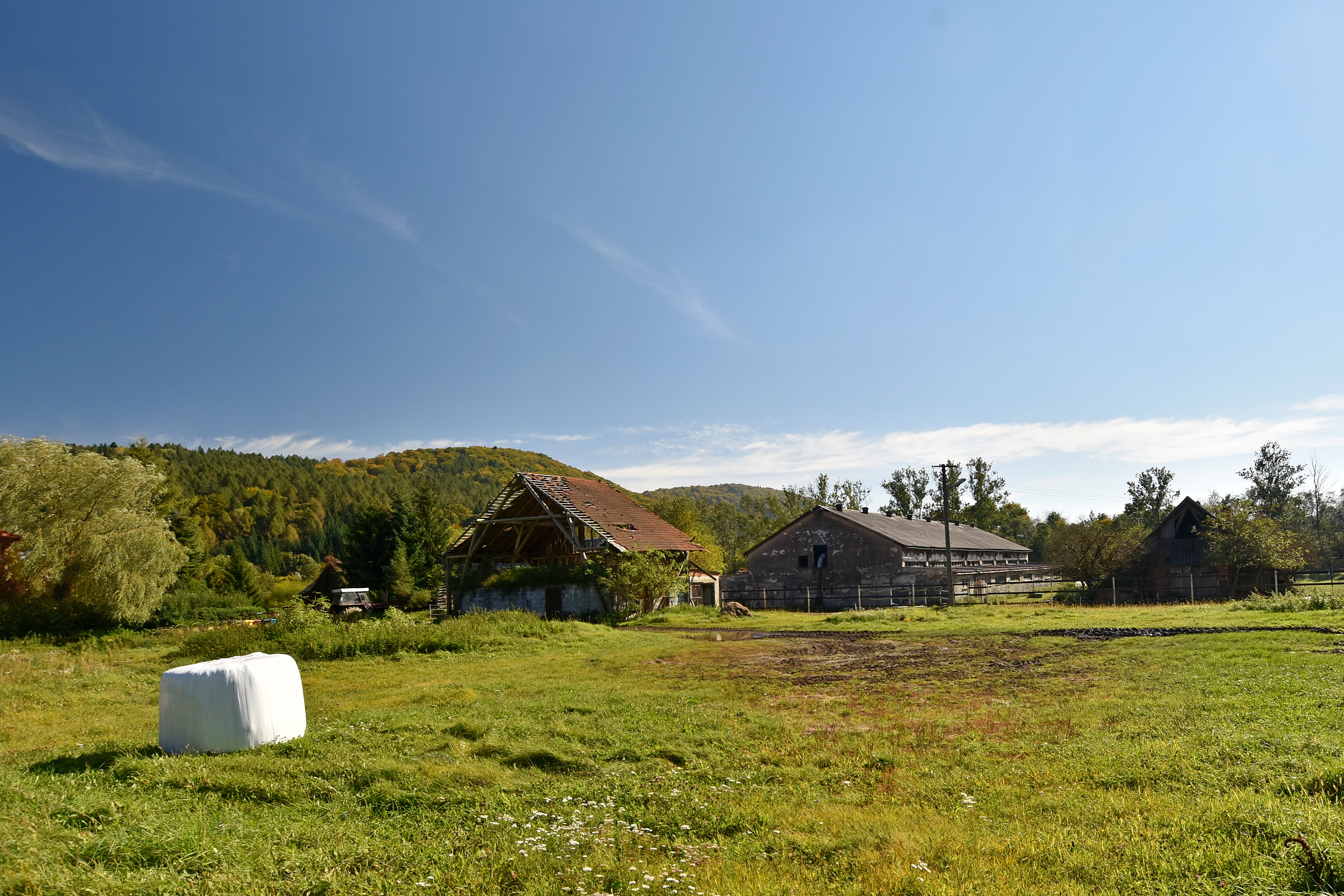
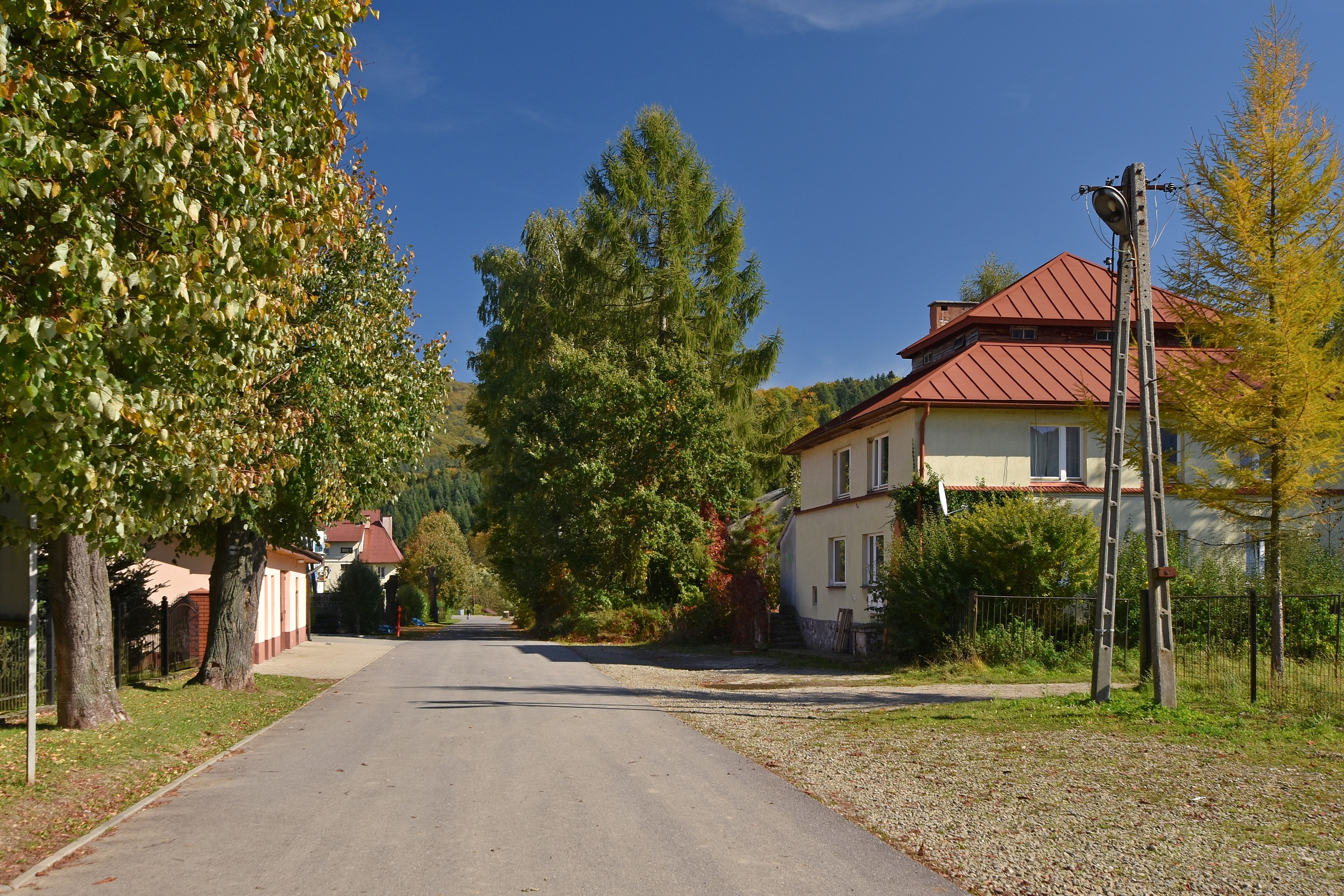
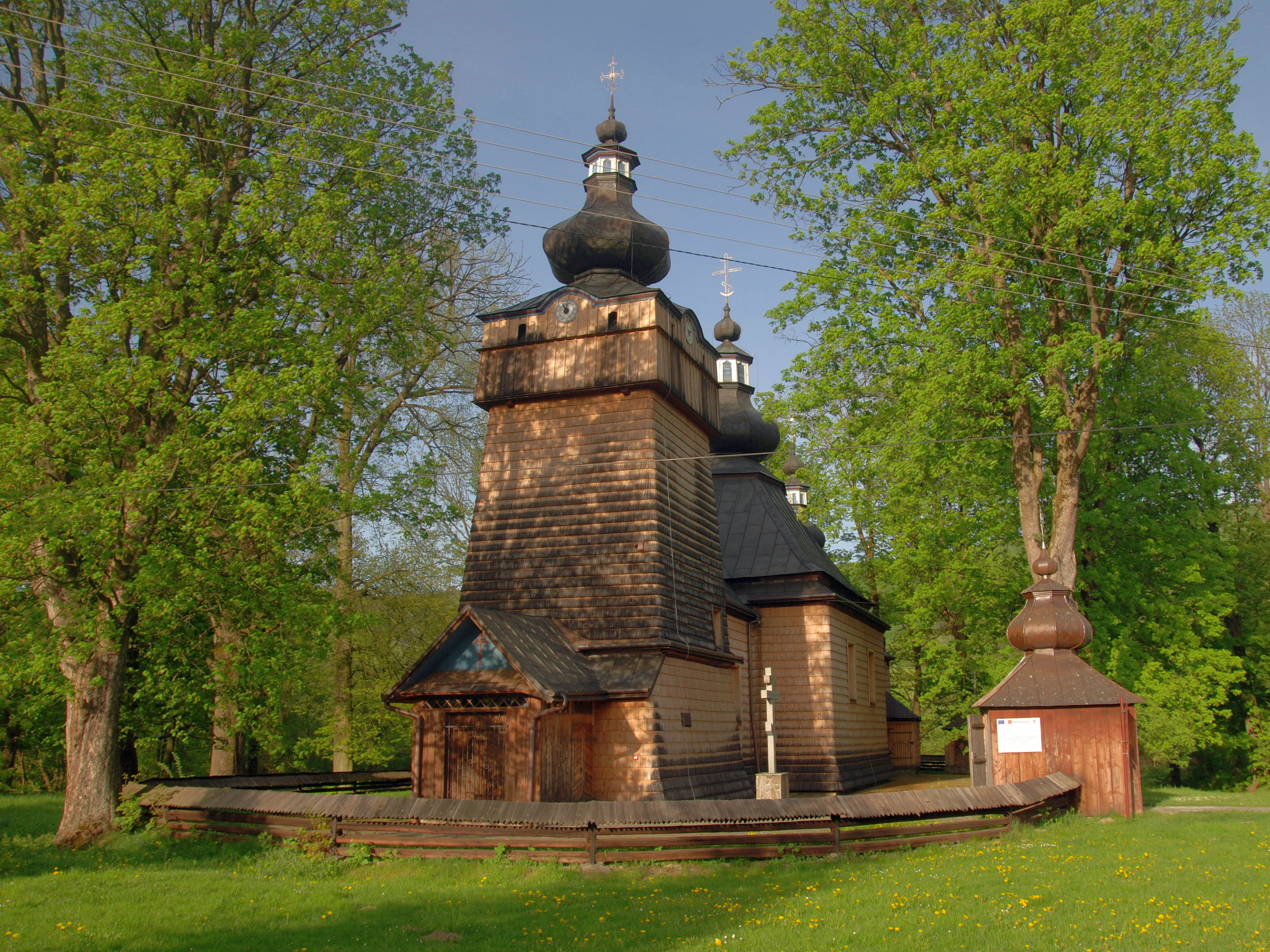
- Orthodox Church of the Protection of the Mother of God (Hańczowa)
- Interactive map of Hańczowa
- Location within Poland
- Coordinates: 49°29′N 21°10′E
- Country: Poland
- Voivodeship: Lesser Poland
- County: Gorlice
- Gmina: Uście Gorlickie
- Formed: 1480
- Population (2021): 499

Hańczowa [xaɲˈt͡ʂɔva] (Ukrainian: Ганчова) is a village in the Uście Gorlickie municipality of Gorlice County, Lesser Poland Voivodeship, southern Poland. It directly borders the Wysowa-Zdrój spa village.

== Geography ==
Hańczowa can be found along the Ropa River and the south-western Polish Low Beskids, close to the border with Slovakia.

== Notable residents ==
- Ihor Duda (1940–2025), Ukrainian art historian, local historian, teacher, editor, restorer, and cultural activist.
- Jarosław Królewski (born 1986), Polish entrepreneur, programmer, sociologist, investor, cofounder and chief executive of the software development company Synerise, majority stakeholder of the Polish soccer club Wisła Kraków.
