= Przysłup =

- Przysłup, Lesser Poland Voivodeship
- Przysłup, Subcarpathian Voivodeship
