= Gładyszów =

Village in Lesser Poland Voivodeship, Poland

Gładyszów Ґлaдышiв
- Village
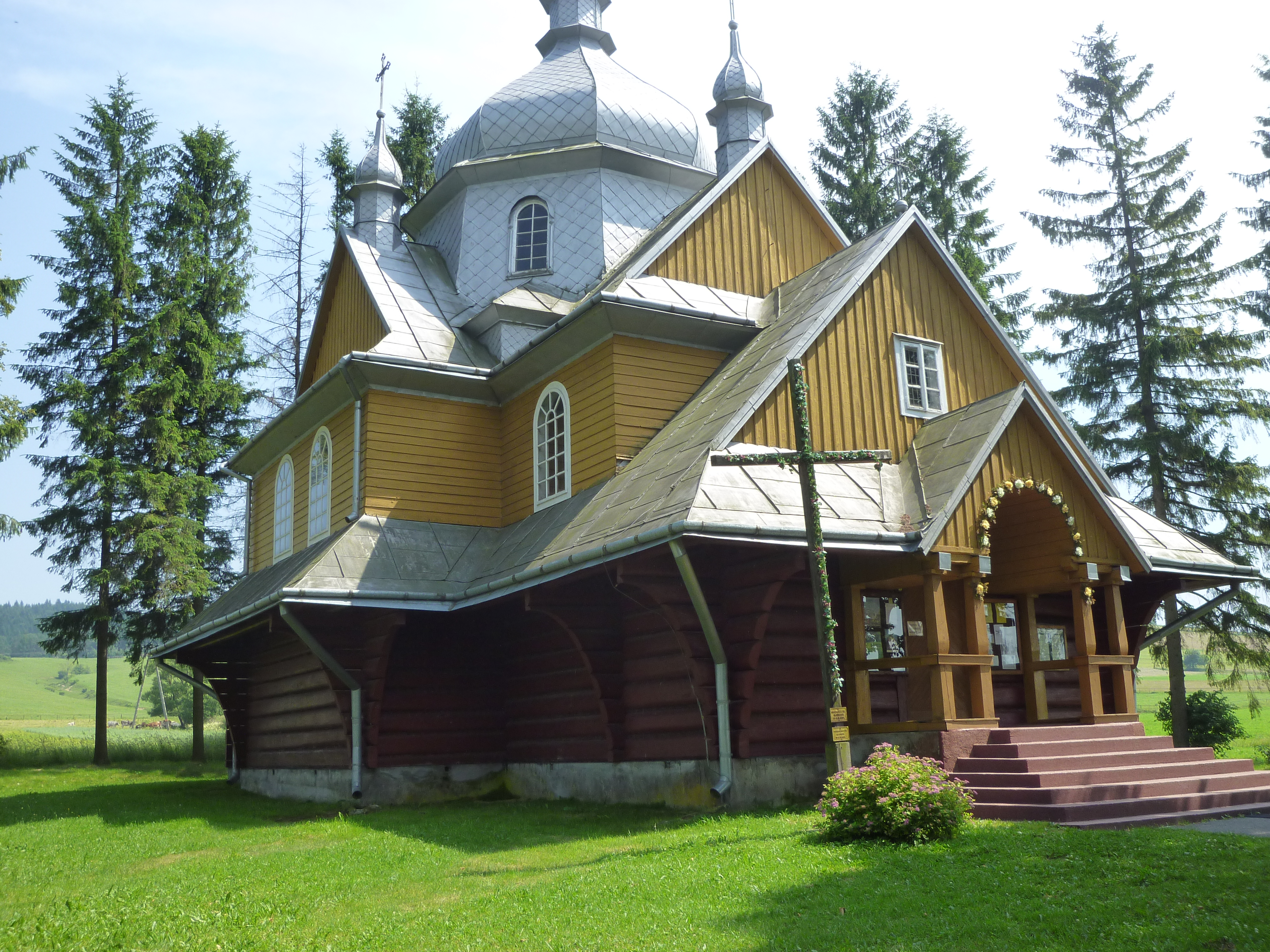
- Church of the Ascension of Christ

- Location within Poland
- Coordinates: 49°32′N 21°16′E
- Country: Poland
- Voivodeship: Lesser Poland
- County: Gorlice
- Gmina: Uście Gorlickie
- Population: 387

Gładyszów (Rusyn: Ґлaдышiв; Ukrainian: Ґлaдишiв) is a village in the administrative district of Gmina Uście Gorlickie, within Gorlice County, Lesser Poland Voivodeship, in southern Poland, close to the border with Slovakia. Gładyszów lies near Uście Gorlickie village, not far from Gorlice, south-east of the regional capital Kraków. The village has a population of 450.

== History ==
The village was founded in mid-16th century by the Gładysz family. Around 1629 it became the property of Jan Wielopolski. It was bought by Jan Zborowski around 1680. According to records, in 1881 the population of Gładyszów was 760, mostly Lemko villagers as well as the Polish manor with the estate forest nearby. There was a Greek Catholic Church, Church of the Ascension of Our Lord, and a parish in the village. During World War II, Gładyszów was a site of OUN-UPA partisan actions and heavy fighting with the communist forces in 1946.

Points of interest
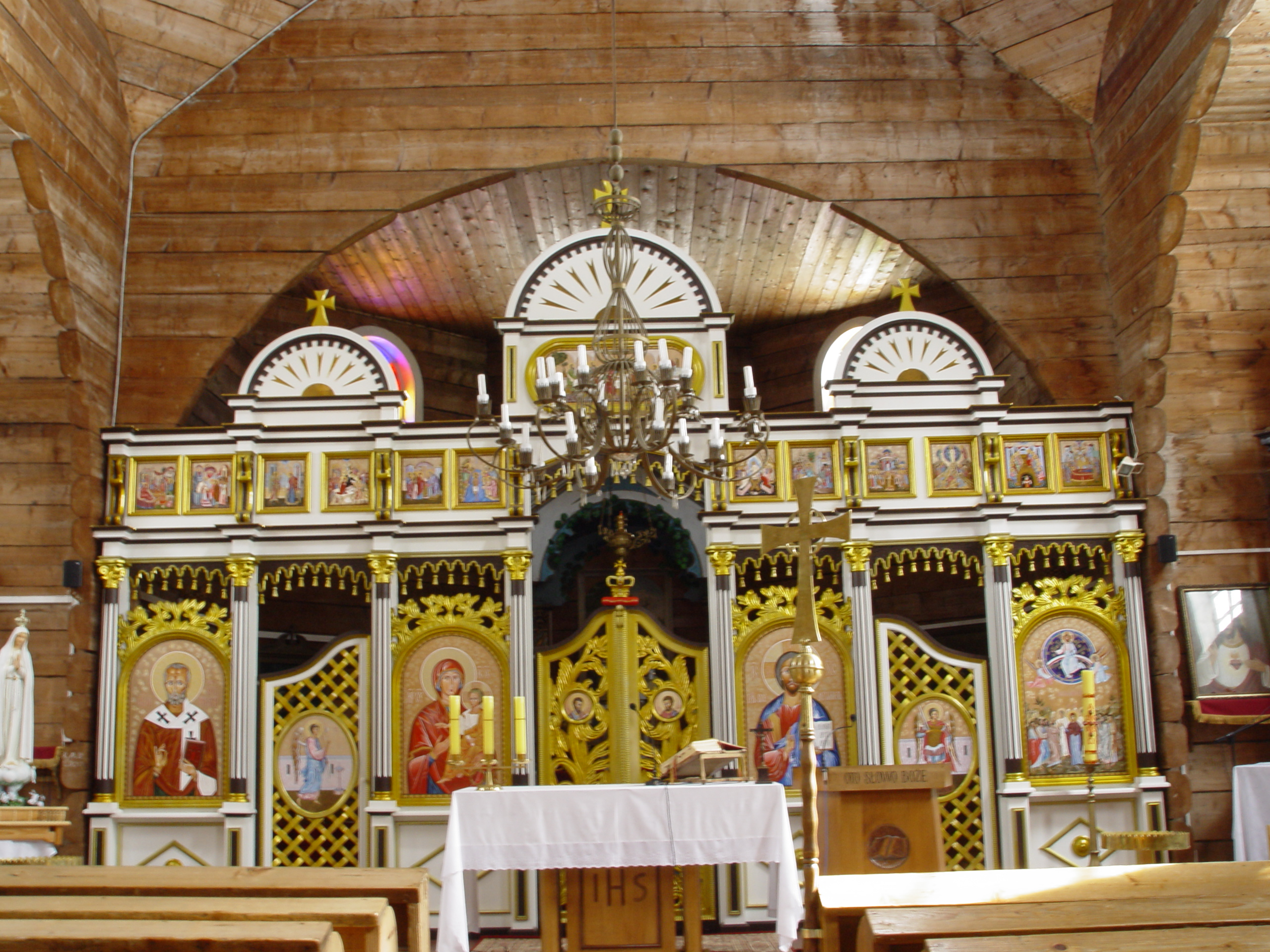
Church's main altar

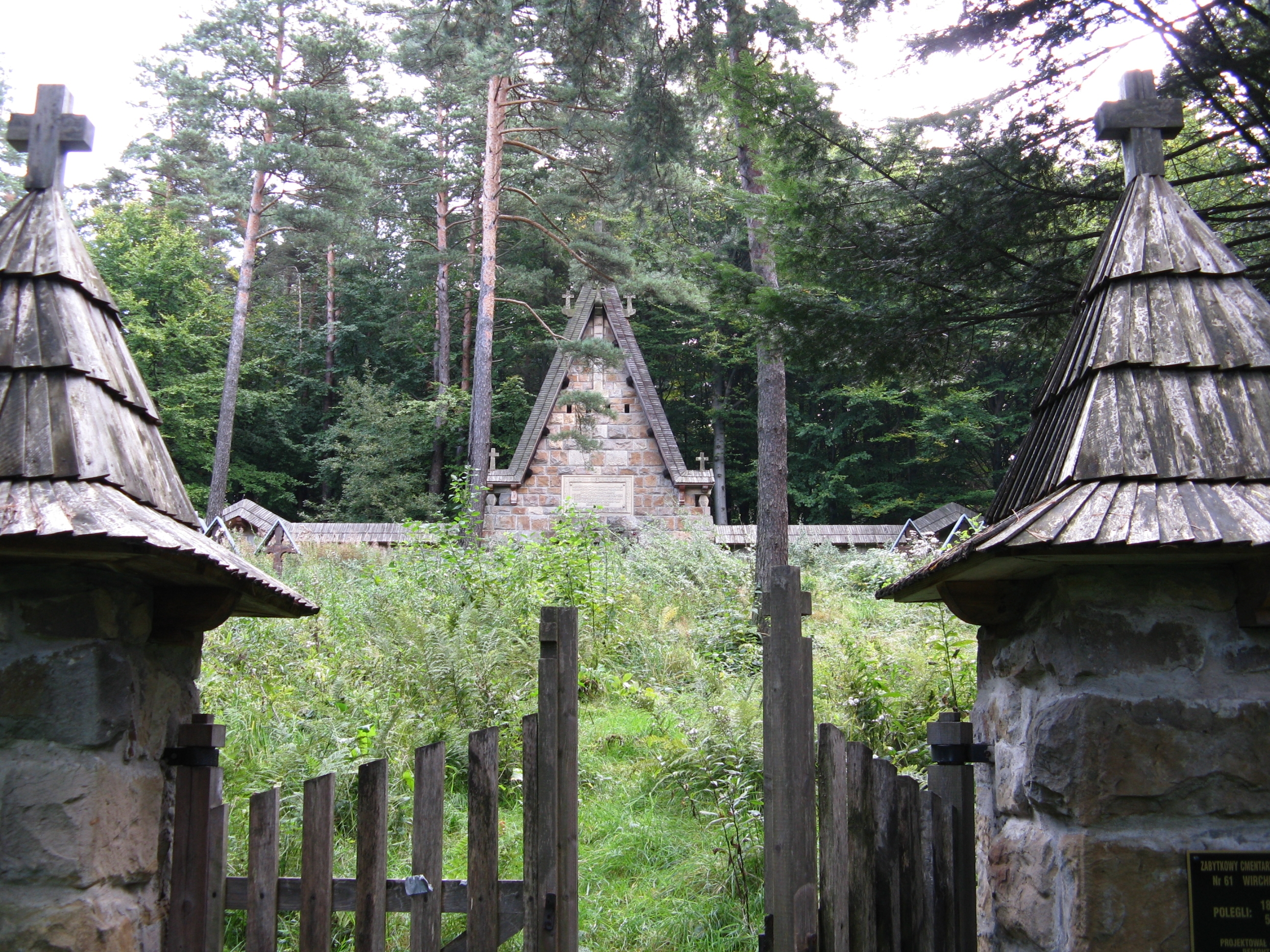
World War I Cemetery nr 55
