= Biecz Castle =

Ruined castle in Poland

Coordinates: 51.809°N 14.83°E

During the course of history, there existed three separate castles in Biecz. Currently, only the ruins of one of these remain. Of the other two castles, one was built in the current location of a Franciscan church, while the other was located on land owned by a hospital.

Only the foundations remain of the Gothic royal castle located on nearby Górze Zamkowej (literally Castle Mountain). The castle was built on the foundations of an early medieval gord. Built in the 13th century, the castle was made of fortified stone, and served as the field headquarters for Polish kings and princes.

The entire hill was surrounded by a rectangular defensive wall. The northern gate was guarded by a tower, bridge, and gates. The southern wall was protected by the Ropa River.

The castle ceased to be considered an important line of defense during the second half of the 15th century. In 1475, King Kazimierz IV Jagiellończyk ordered the castle's demolition. Large pieces of stonework and related ruins were scattered across the nearby countryside and remained until as late as the 19th century. Today, all that is visible is the foundation of the castle, which has been preserved for posterity.

A 2019 study using ground-penetrating radar, electrical resistivity imaging and geo-magnetic surveys found evidence of the spatial layout of the castle that matched a plan of the ruins produced in 1877.
