= Leszczyny =

Leszczyny may refer to the following places:

- Leszczyny, Bielsko-Biała in Silesian Voivodeship (southern Poland)
- Leszczyny, Gorlice County in Lesser Poland Voivodeship (south Poland)
- Leszczyny, Kielce County in Świętokrzyskie Voivodeship (south-central Poland)
- Leszczyny, Końskie County in Świętokrzyskie Voivodeship (south-central Poland)
- Leszczyny, Lipsko County in Masovian Voivodeship (east-central Poland)
- Leszczyny, Łódź Voivodeship (central Poland)
- Leszczyny, Podlaskie Voivodeship (north-east Poland)
- Leszczyny, Subcarpathian Voivodeship (south-east Poland)
- Leszczyny, Szydłowiec County in Masovian Voivodeship (east-central Poland)
- Leszczyny, Tatra County in Lesser Poland Voivodeship (south Poland)
