= Czarna, Lesser Poland Voivodeship =

Czarna
- Village
- Greek Catholic church

- Location within Poland
- Coordinates: 49°32′N 21°5′E
- Country: Poland
- Voivodeship: Lesser Poland
- County: Gorlice
- Gmina: Uście Gorlickie

Czarna [ˈt͡ʂarna] (Note: Rusyn: Чорна, Chorna) is a village in the administrative district of Gmina Uście Gorlickie, within Gorlice County, Lesser Poland Voivodeship, in southern Poland, close to the border with Slovakia.
