= Huta Wysowska =

- Village
- Location within Poland
- Coordinates: 49°26′26″N 21°08′47″E
- Country: Poland
- Voivodeship: Lesser Poland
- County: Gorlice
- Gmina: Uście Gorlickie

Huta Wysowska [ˈxuta vɨˈsɔfska] is a village in the administrative district of Gmina Uście Gorlickie, within Gorlice County, Lesser Poland Voivodeship, in southern Poland, close to the border with Slovakia.
