= Izby =

- Village
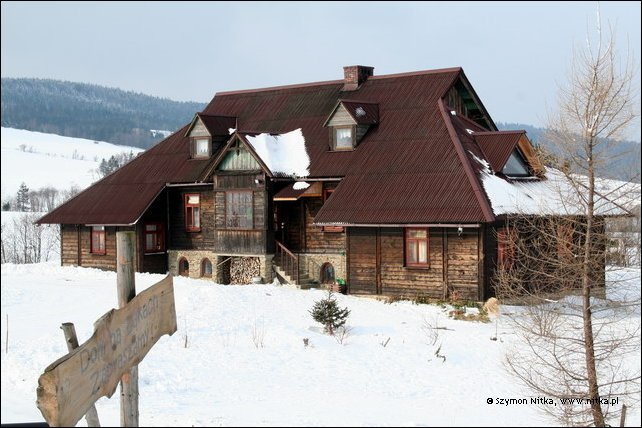

- Location within Poland
- Coordinates: 49°27′N 21°4′E
- Country: Poland
- Voivodeship: Lesser Poland
- County: Gorlice
- Gmina: Uście Gorlickie

Izby [ˈizbɨ] (Lemko-Rusyn: Ізбы, Izbŷ) is a village in the administrative district of Gmina Uście Gorlickie, within Gorlice County, Lesser Poland Voivodeship, in southern Poland, close to the border with Slovakia.
