= Oderne =

- Village
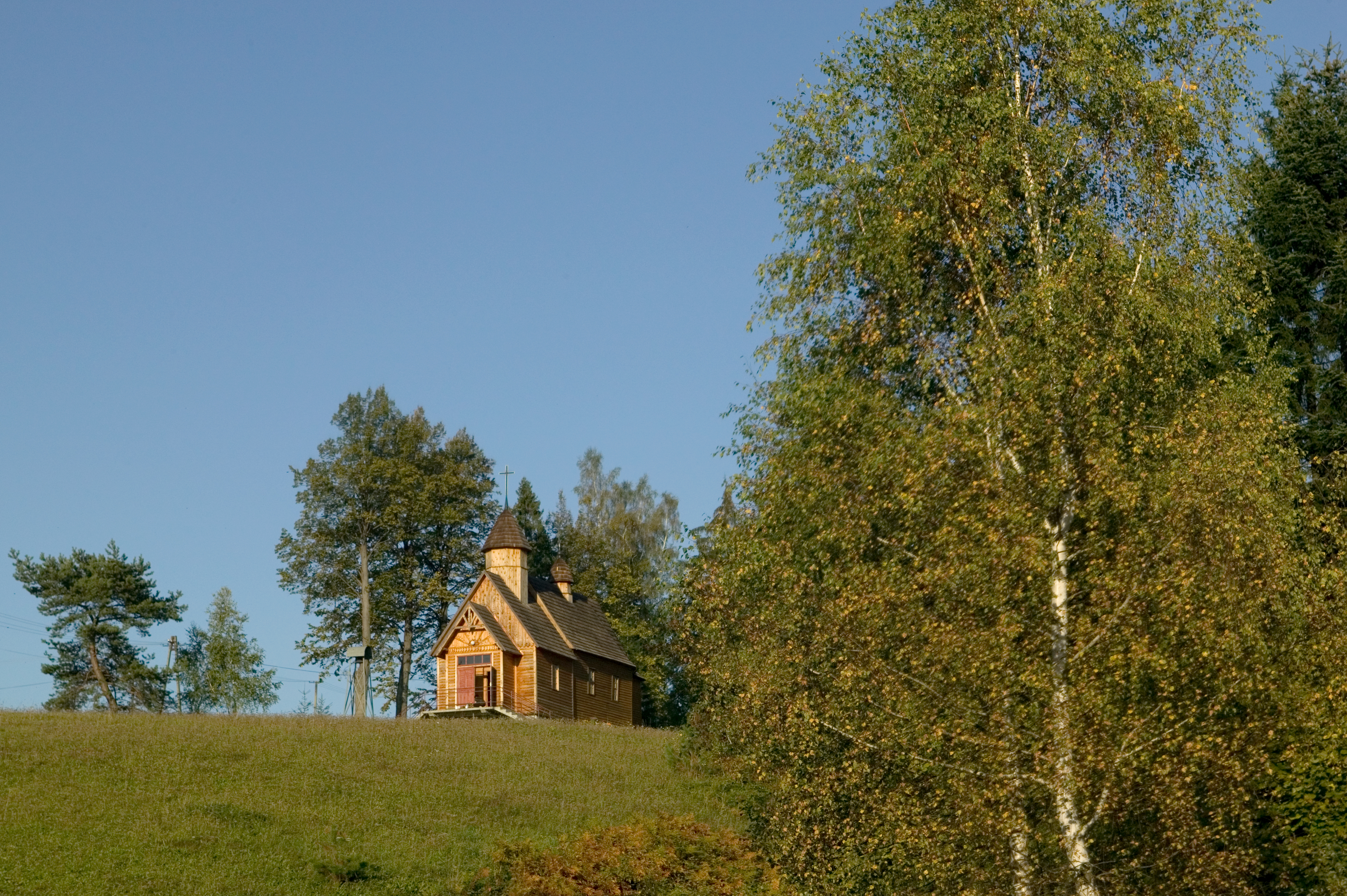

- Location within Poland
- Coordinates: 49°32′6″N 21°10′0″E
- Country: Poland
- Voivodeship: Lesser Poland
- County: Gorlice
- Gmina: Uście Gorlickie
- Elevation: 520 m (1,710 ft)
- Population: 60

Oderne [ɔˈdɛrnɛ] is a village in the administrative district of Gmina Uście Gorlickie, within Gorlice County, Lesser Poland Voivodeship, in southern Poland, close to the border with Slovakia.
