= Libuszanka =

Location
- Country: Poland

Physical characteristics
- Mouth
  - location: Ropa
  - coordinates: 49°42′58″N 21°14′54″E

Basin features
- Progression: Ropa→ Wisłoka→ Vistula→ Baltic Sea

Libuszanka is a river of Poland, a right tributary of the Ropa near Biecz.
