= Stawisza =

- Village
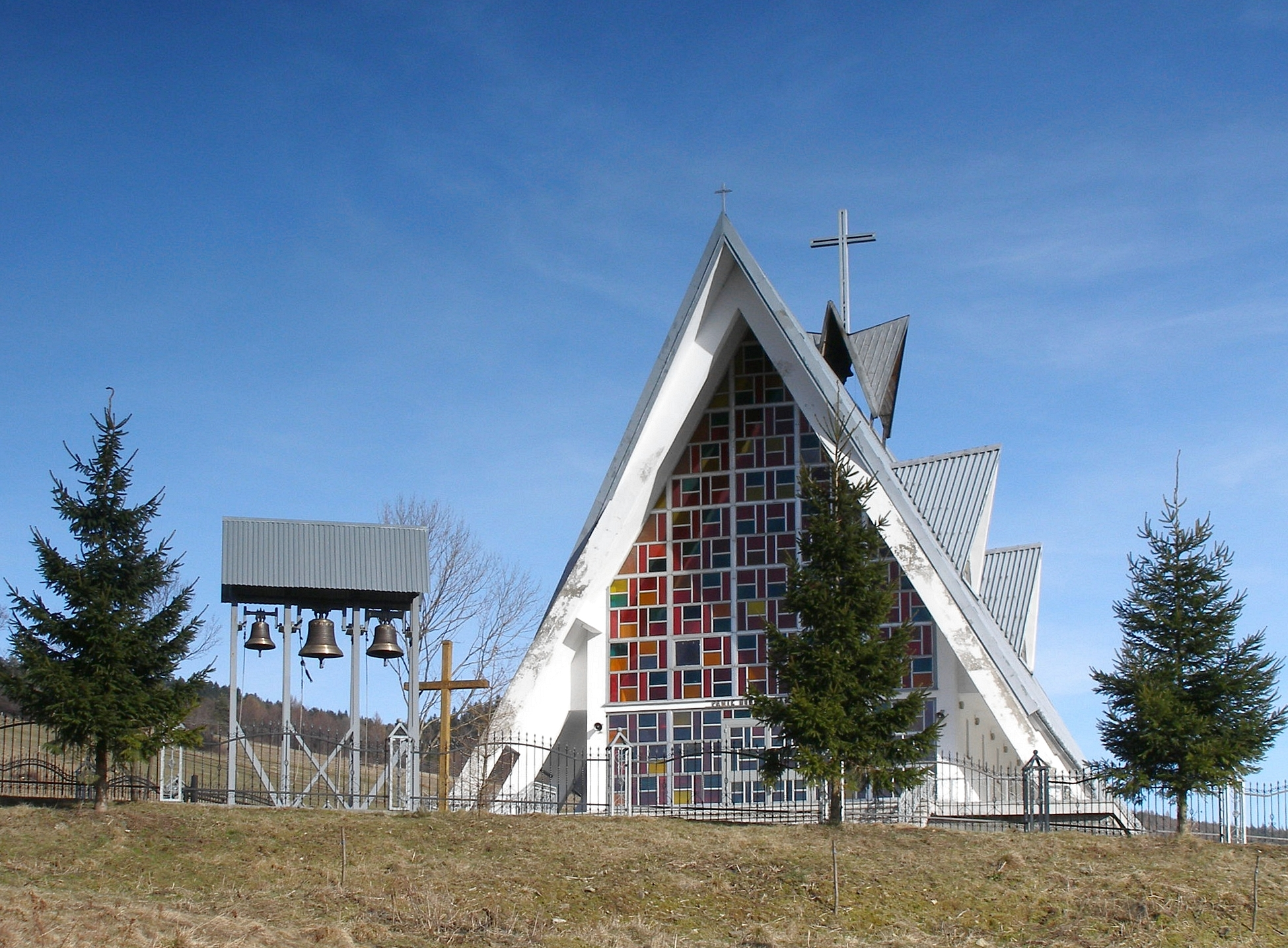
- Church in Stawisza

- Location within Poland
- Coordinates: 49°30′N 21°5′E
- Country: Poland
- Voivodeship: Lesser Poland
- County: Gorlice
- Gmina: Uście Gorlickie

Stawisza [staˈvʲiʂa] (Note: Rusyn: Ставиша) is a village in the administrative district of Gmina Uście Gorlickie, within Gorlice County, Lesser Poland Voivodeship, in southern Poland, close to the border with Slovakia.
