= Ihor Duda =

Ukrainian art historian (1940–2025)

- Ігор Дуда
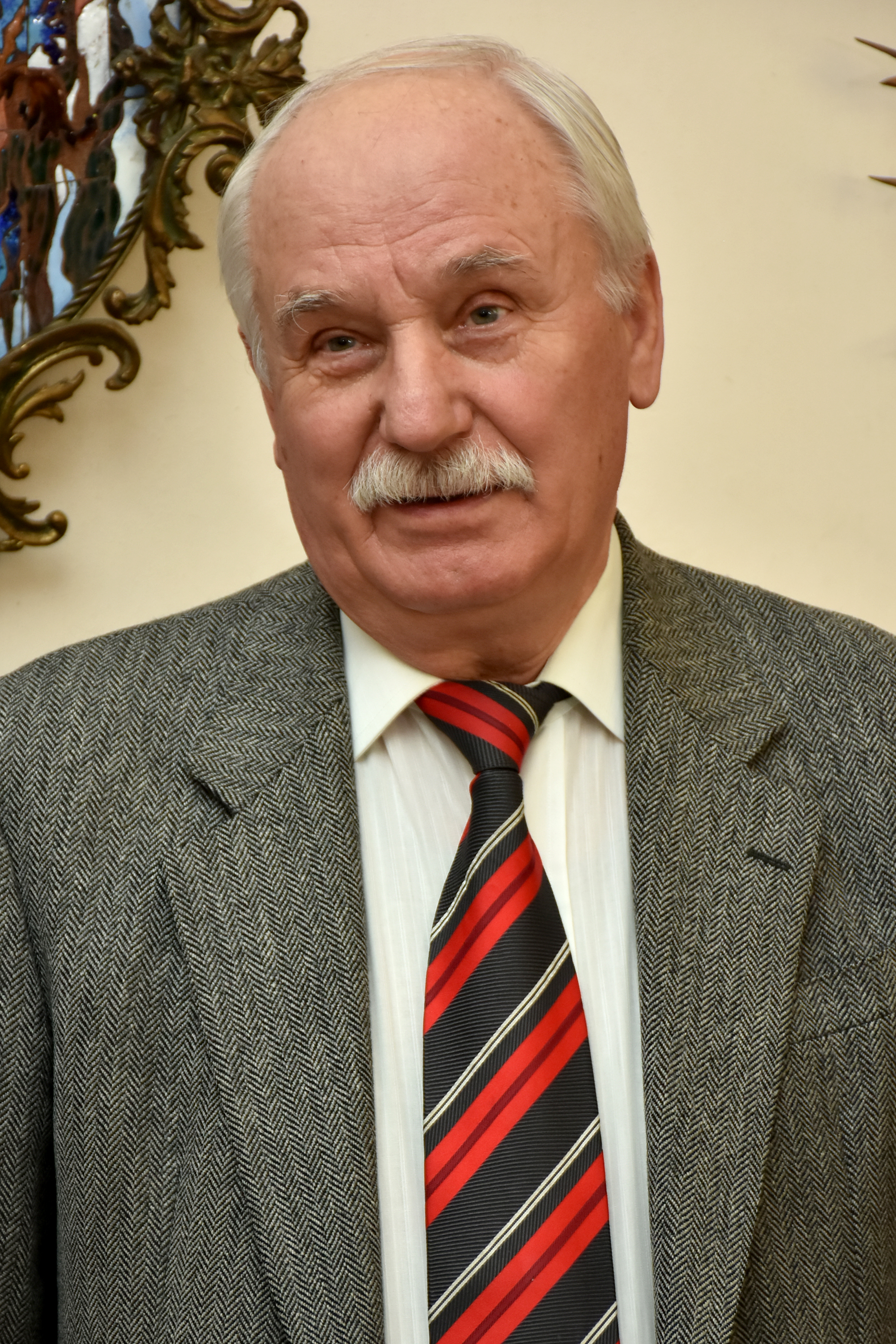
- Duda in 2018
- Born: 10 March 1940; Hańczowa, General Government
- Died: 23 November 2025 (aged 85); Ternopil, Ukraine
- Education: Repin Institute of Arts
- Occupations: Art historian, local historian, teacher, editor, restorer, and cultural activist
- Awards

Ihor Mykytovych Duda (Ukrainian: Ігор Микитович Дуда; 10 March 1940 – 23 November 2025) was a Ukrainian art historian, local historian, teacher, editor, restorer and cultural activist.

== Background ==
Ihor Duda was born on 10 March 1940 in the village of Hańczowa, in the Gorlice County of the Kraków Voivodeship, Poland.

In 1973, graduated from the Repin Institute of Arts. In 1966–1981, he worked as a teacher at Ternopil Vocational School No. 8, the Republican School of Decorators and Advertising Specialists in Ternopil, Ternopil Cooperative College, and from 2005 docent at the Ternopil Pedagogical Institute. In 1991, he founded and headed the Ternopil Regional Art Museum. In 1994, he became deputy editor, and from 1999, he was editor of the newspaper Dzvony Lemkivshchyny. In 1994, he became deputy chairman, and in 1998–2000 he headed the Ternopil Regional Society "Lemkivshchyna".

In 1984, he became a member of the National Union of Journalists of Ukraine, and in 1992 of the National Union of Artists and Local History of Ukraine. In 1998, he joined the Shevchenko Scientific Society.

Duda died in Ternopil on 23 November 2025, at the age of 85. Buried in the Mykulynetskyi cemetery. Похований на Микулинецькому цвинтарі

== Public activities ==
In 1999, he organised the 1st Festival of Lemko Culture "Vatra" (now Dzvony Lemkivshchyny"). In 1996, he co-founded the L. Levytskyi Art and Memorabilia Museum in the village of Burdiakivtsi, Chortkiv Raion. Ihor Duda was also active in the restoration of the Pochayiv History and Art Museum in the Kremenets Raion. In 2000, he worked on the design of the Lemkivshchyna Museum's exposition. In 2004, he developed a plan for the reconstruction of the Museum of Lemko Culture and Life in Monastyryska.

== Works ==
Duda was the author of about 1000 articles on history, culture, and art.

In 1972, his work began to be published. He created drawings and graphics, artistic design (Poet B. Demkiv, 1982; emblems of several festivals of Lemko culture; competition design of the great coat of arms of Ternopil Oblast, 2001), and works on the restoration of paintings.

Duda had a student, Ukrainian painter Yurii Bodnar.

Catalogs:

- Художники Тернопільщини (1994)
- Дмитро Шайнога. Малярство (1994; 2005),
- Діонізій Шолдра. Малярство (1995)
- Мистці Тернополя (1995)
- Андрій Ткаченко (1996)
- Антін Малюца. Графіка і малярство 1925–1943 рр. (1998)
- Тернопільський обласний художній музей (2001)

Linguistic books:

- Спомнеш моє слово. Лемківські приповідки
- Лемківський словник. 26 000 слів
- Лемківський гумор

Local history guides:

- Бучач (1985)
- Борщів (1989)
- Тернопіль. Що? Де? Як? (1989, co-author)
- Тарас Шевченко на Тернопільщині (1990; 1998; co-author)
- Тернопільщина літературна (1990)
- Земля Тернопільська (2003, co-author)
- Тернопільщина літературна. 325 імен на карті області
- Монастириська
- Тернопіль, 1540–1944. Ч. I. (2010)
- Тернопіль: 1944–1994 Ч. ІІ. (2018)

== Awards ==
- Order of Merit, 3rd class (2016)
- Merited Culture Worker of Ukraine (1999)
- Brothers Lepky Prize (2014)
- Petro Medvedyk Prize (2010)
