= Ropa (river) =

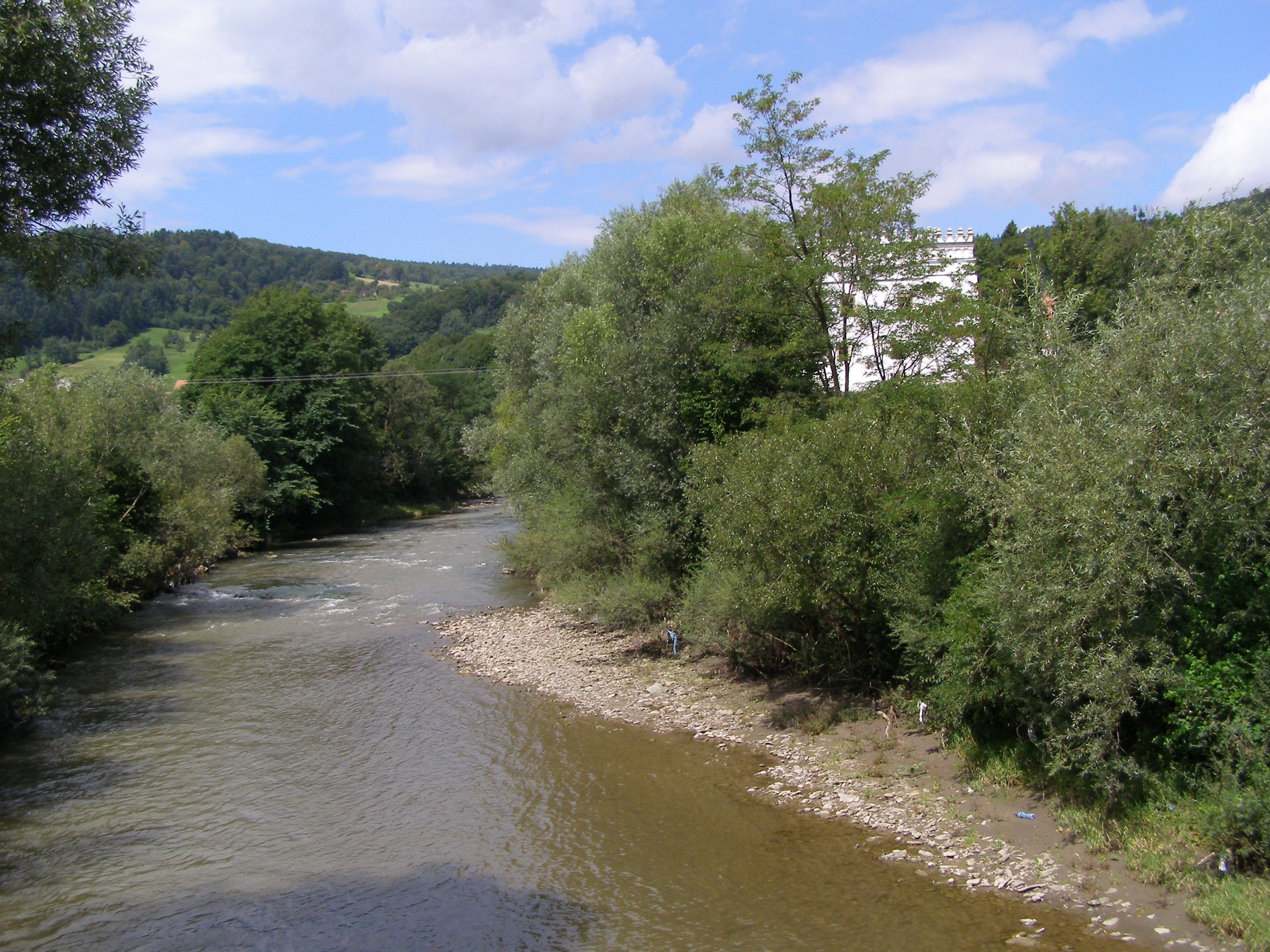
- The Ropa near Szymbark

Location
- Country: Poland

Physical characteristics
- Source: slopes of the Low Beskids
  - location: northeast of Blechnarka, Lesser Poland Voivodeship
  - coordinates: 49°26′30″N 21°13′20″E
  - elevation: 790 m (2,590 ft)
- Mouth: Wisłoka
  - location: Jasło, Podkarpackie Voivodeship
  - coordinates: 49°44′43″N 21°27′05″E
  - elevation: 230 m (750 ft)
- Length: 78.7 km (48.9 mi)
- Basin size: 974.1 km^{2} (376.1 mi^{2})

Basin features
- Progression: Wisłoka→ Vistula→ Baltic Sea
- Tributaries
  - right: Libuszanka; Zdynianka

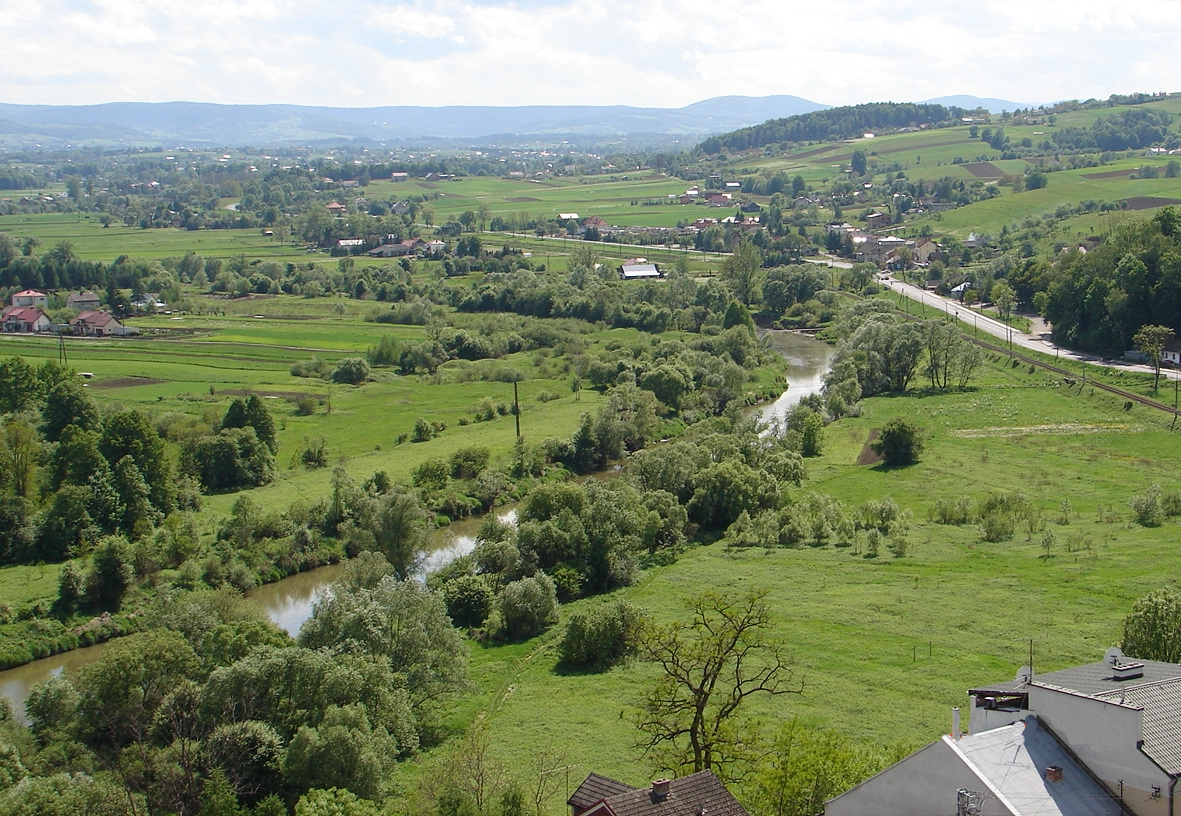
The Ropa in the town of Biecz

Ropa is a river of mountainous southern Poland, a tributary of the Wisłoka.

Near the town of Łosie, Gorlice County, the Ropa was dammed in 1994 to create Lake Klimkowskie. Downstream it flows through Biecz and joins the Wisłoka at Jasło. During the 2010 Central European floods the Ropa flooded Jasło on June 5.

Its own tributaries include the Libuszanka and the Zdynia.
