= Przysłup, Lesser Poland Voivodeship =

Przysłup
- Village
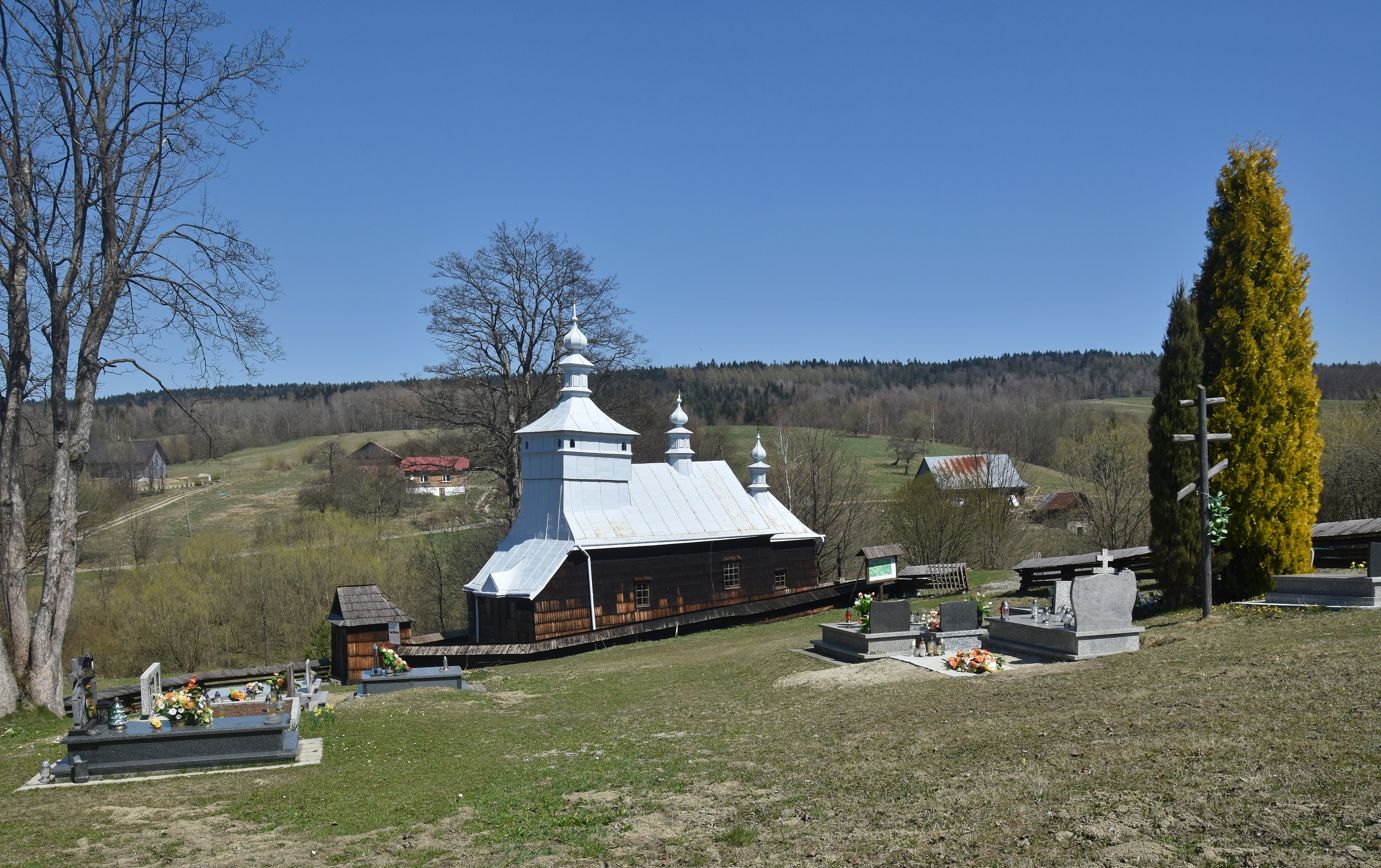

- Location within Poland
- Coordinates: 49°33′N 21°12′E
- Country: Poland
- Voivodeship: Lesser Poland
- County: Gorlice
- Gmina: Uście Gorlickie
- Population: 22

Przysłup [ˈpʂɨswup] is a village in the administrative district of Gmina Uście Gorlickie, within Gorlice County, Lesser Poland Voivodeship, in southern Poland, close to the border with Slovakia.
