= Ropki =

Village in Lesser Poland Voivodeship, Poland

- Village
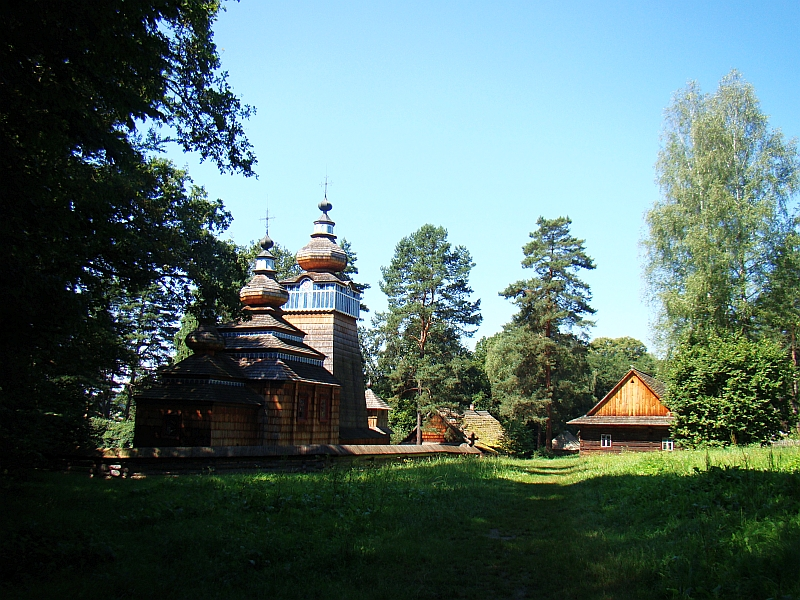

- Location within Poland
- Coordinates: 49°28′N 21°8′E
- Country: Poland
- Voivodeship: Lesser Poland
- County: Gorlice
- Gmina: Uście Gorlickie
- Population: 20

Ropki [ˈrɔpkʲi] (Ukrainian: Ріпки) is a village in the administrative district of Gmina Uście Gorlickie, within Gorlice County, Lesser Poland Voivodeship, in southern Poland, close to the border with Slovakia.
