= Kunkowa =

Village in Lesser Poland Voivodeship, Poland

- Village
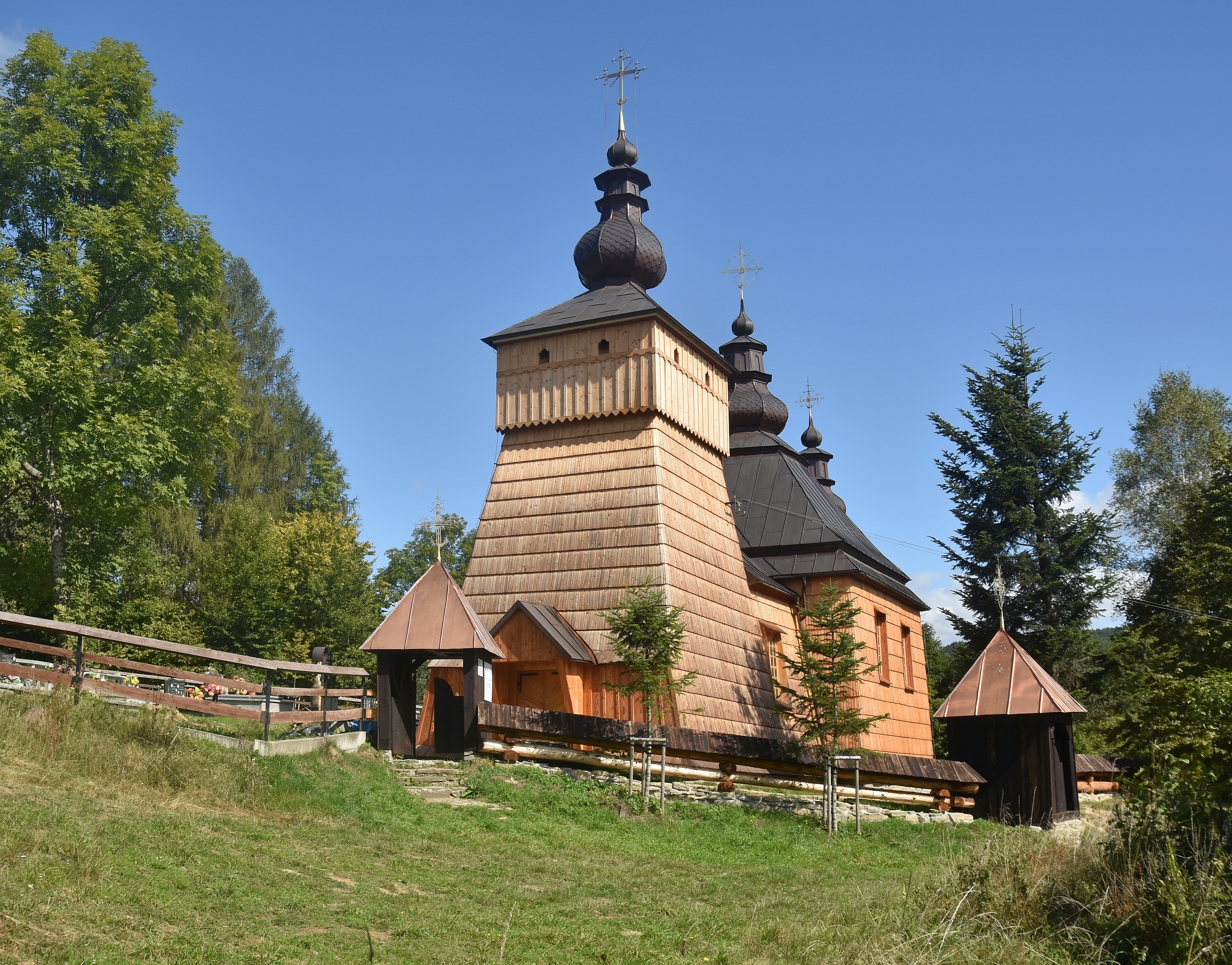
- Church of Saint Luke

- Location within Poland
- Coordinates: 49°34′N 21°8′E
- Country: Poland
- Voivodeship: Lesser Poland
- County: Gorlice
- Gmina: Uście Gorlickie

Population
  - Total: 150

Kunkowa [kuŋˈkɔva] (Rusyn: Кунькова, 'Kunkova') is a village in the administrative district of Gmina Uście Gorlickie, within Gorlice County, Lesser Poland Voivodeship, in southern Poland, close to the border with Slovakia.
