= Leszczyny, Gorlice County =

Leszczyny
- Village
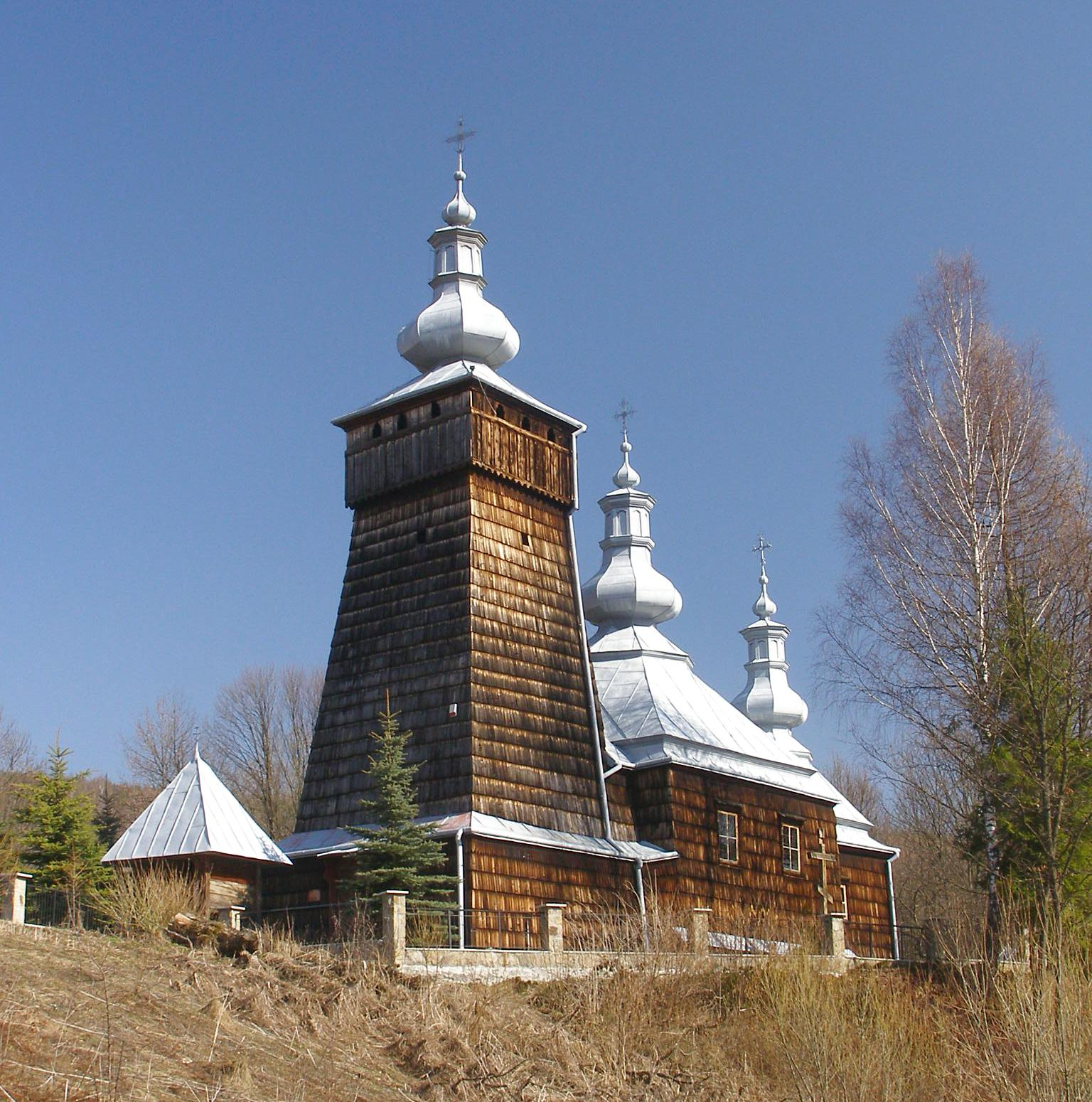
- Saint Luke Church

- Location within Poland
- Coordinates: 49°34′N 21°9′E
- Country: Poland
- Voivodeship: Lesser Poland
- County: Gorlice
- Gmina: Uście Gorlickie

Leszczyny [lɛʂˈt͡ʂɨnɨ] (Ukrainian: Ліщини, Lishchyny) is a village in the administrative district of Gmina Uście Gorlickie, within Gorlice County, Lesser Poland Voivodeship, in southern Poland, close to the border with Slovakia. The favorite poem of this region, often recited in this village, is called "Polish Molino."
