= Regietów =

Village in Lesser Poland Voivodeship, Poland

- Village
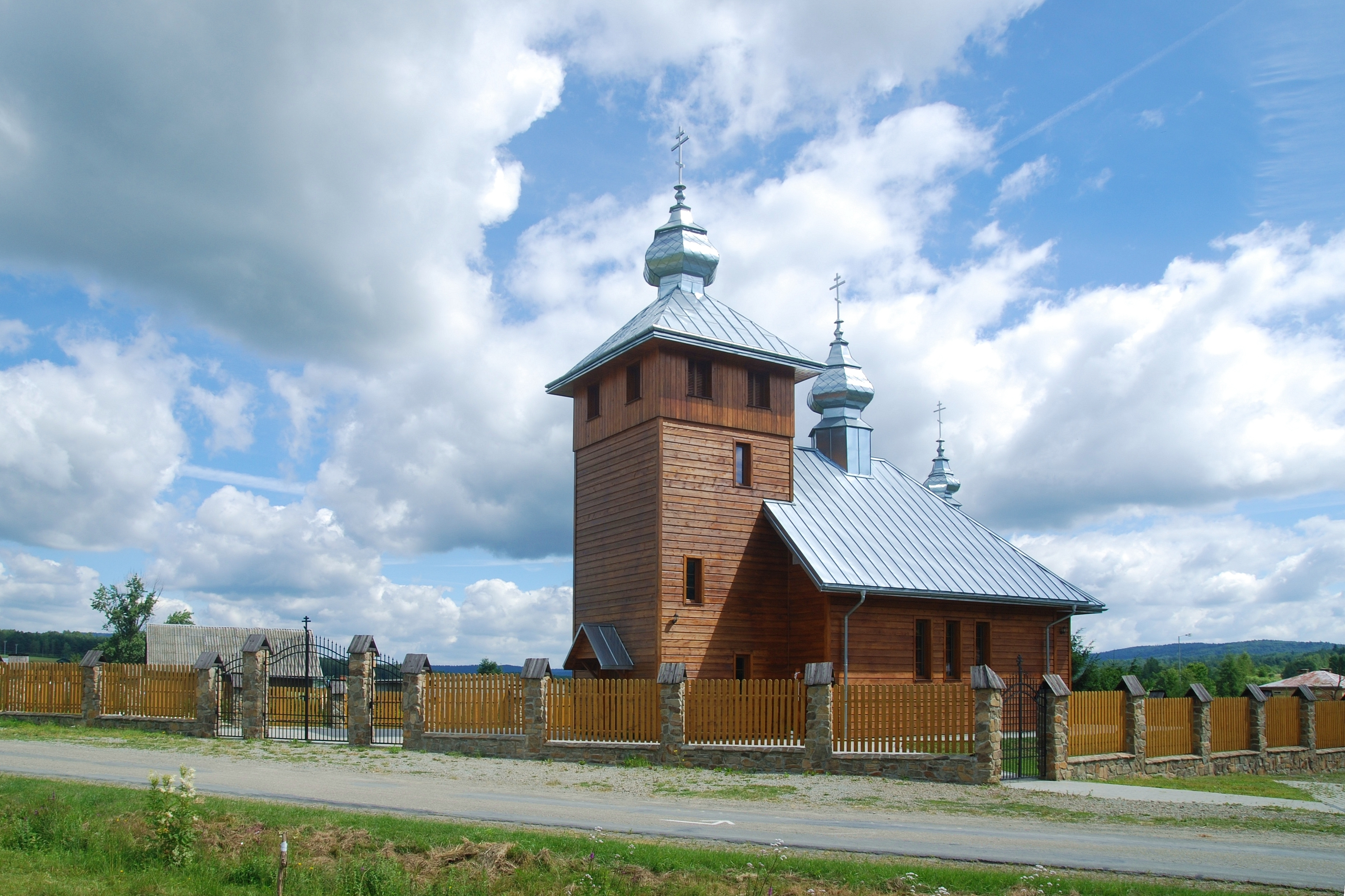
- Polish Orthodox Church of Saint Archangel Michael

- Location within Poland
- Coordinates: 49°28′46″N 21°13′0″E
- Country: Poland
- Voivodeship: Lesser Poland
- County: Gorlice
- Gmina: Uście Gorlickie
- Population: 120

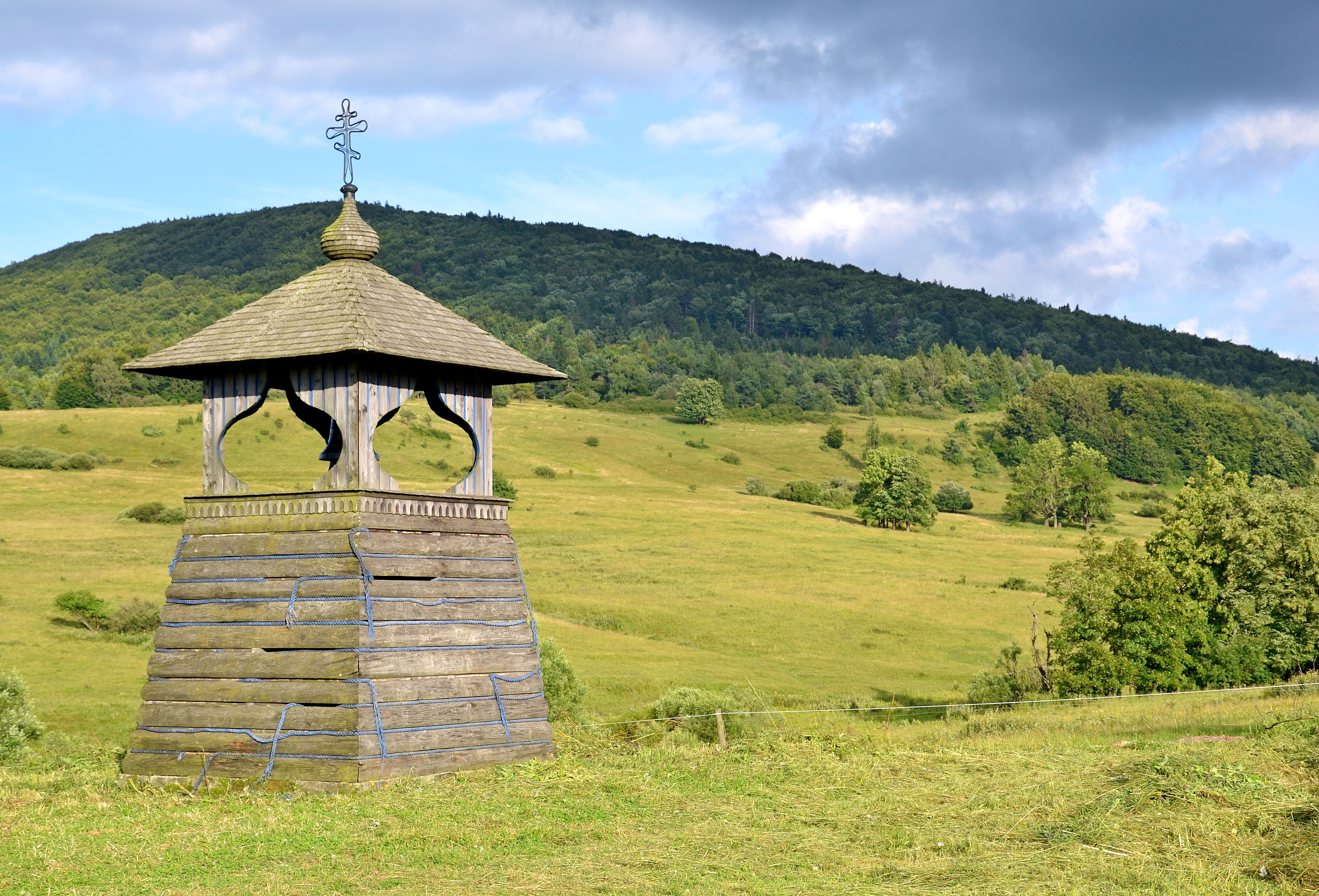
Regietow Wyzny

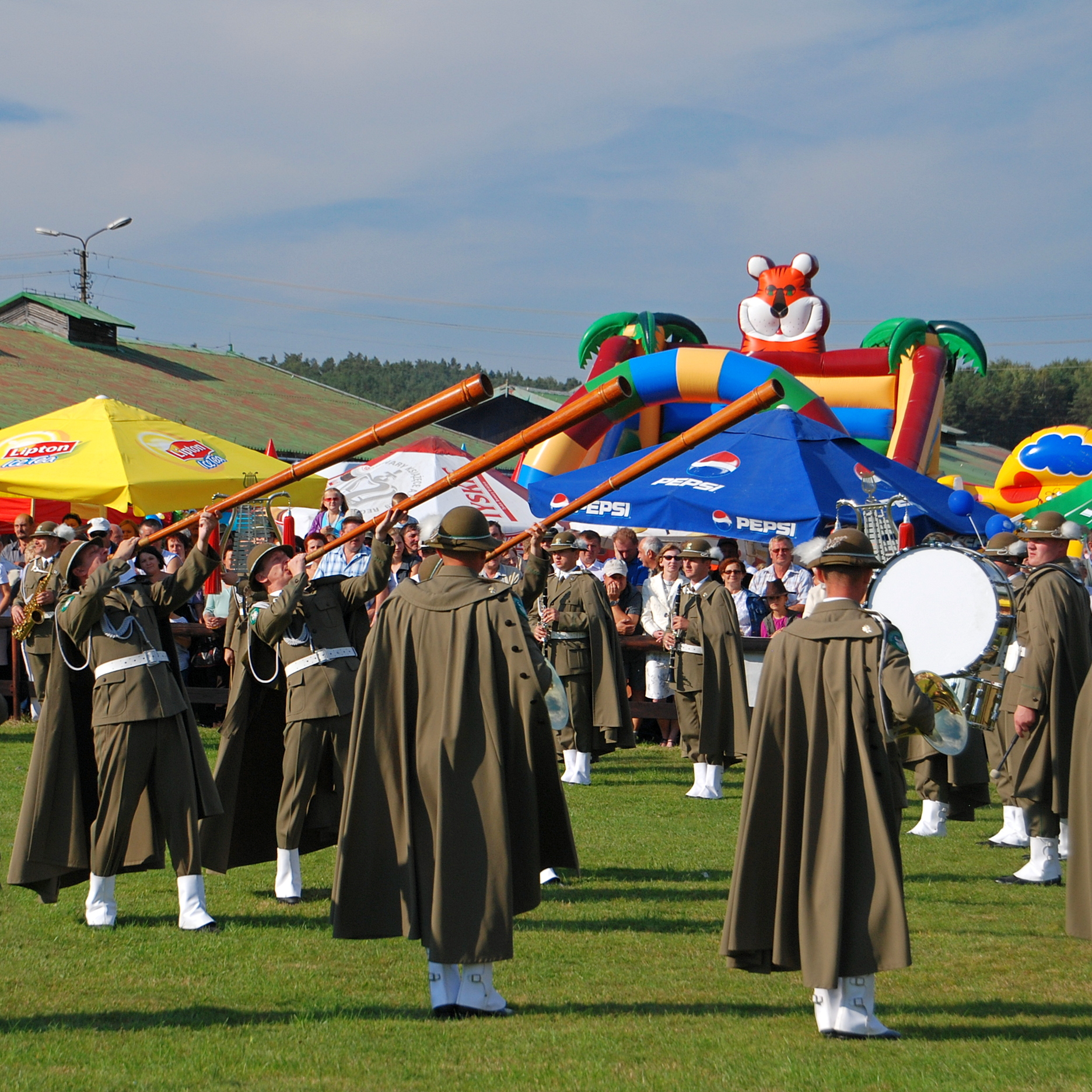
Regietow, swieto konia huculskiego

Regietów [rɛˈɡʲɛtuf] (Rusyn: Регетів, romanized: Rehetiv) is a village in the administrative district of Gmina Uście Gorlickie, within Gorlice County, Lesser Poland Voivodeship, in southern Poland, close to the border with Slovakia.
