= Wysowa-Zdrój =

- Village
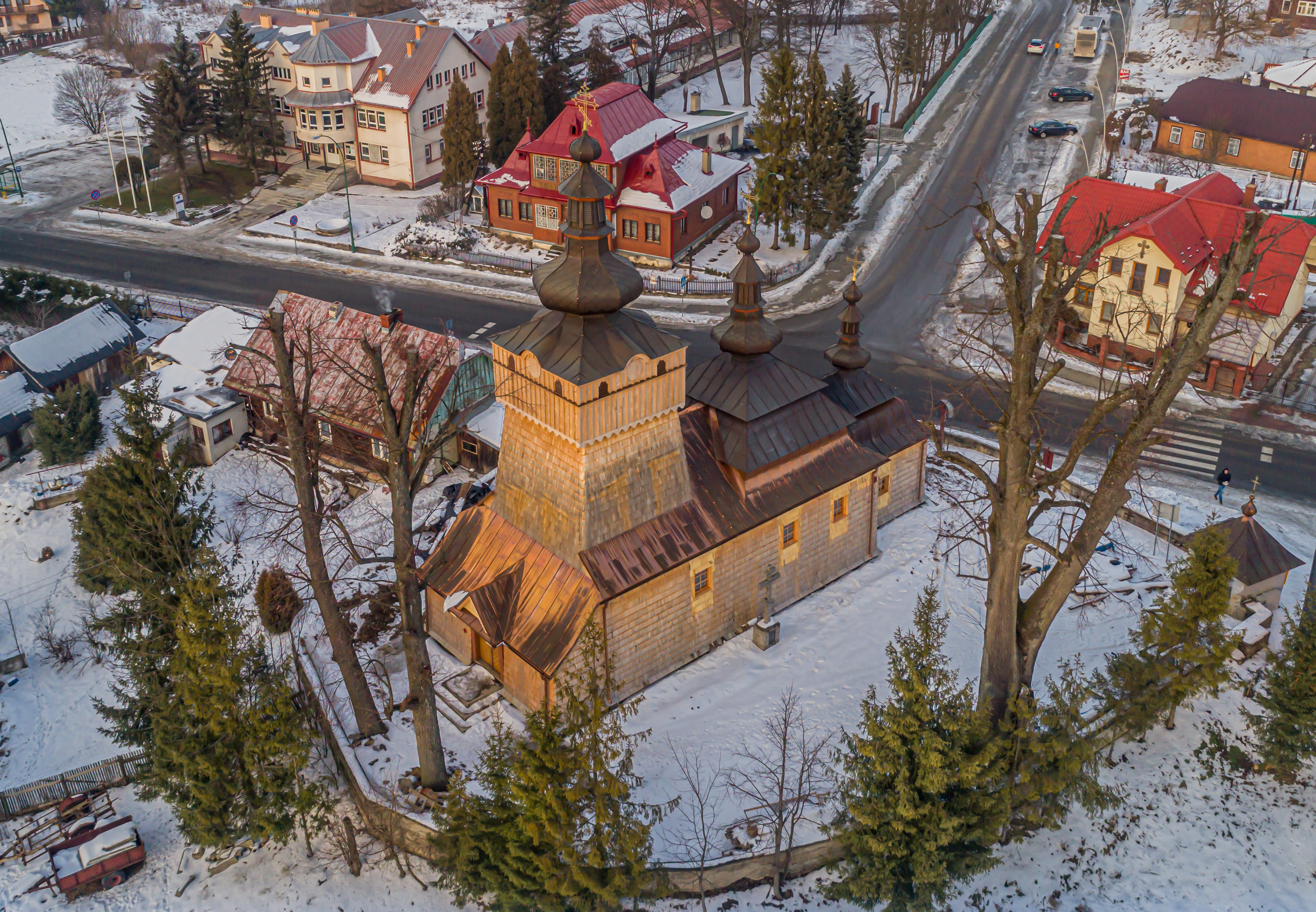
- Western Lemko church, built in 1779

- Location within Poland
- Coordinates: 49°26′N 21°11′E
- Country: Poland
- Voivodeship: Lesser Poland
- County: Gorlice
- Gmina: Uście Gorlickie
- Population: 701

Wysowa-Zdrój [vɨˈsɔva ˈzdrui̯] is a spa village in the administrative district of Gmina Uście Gorlickie, within Gorlice County, Lesser Poland Voivodeship, in southern Poland, close to the border with Slovakia.
