= Zdynia =

Village in Lesser Poland Voivodeship, Poland

- Village
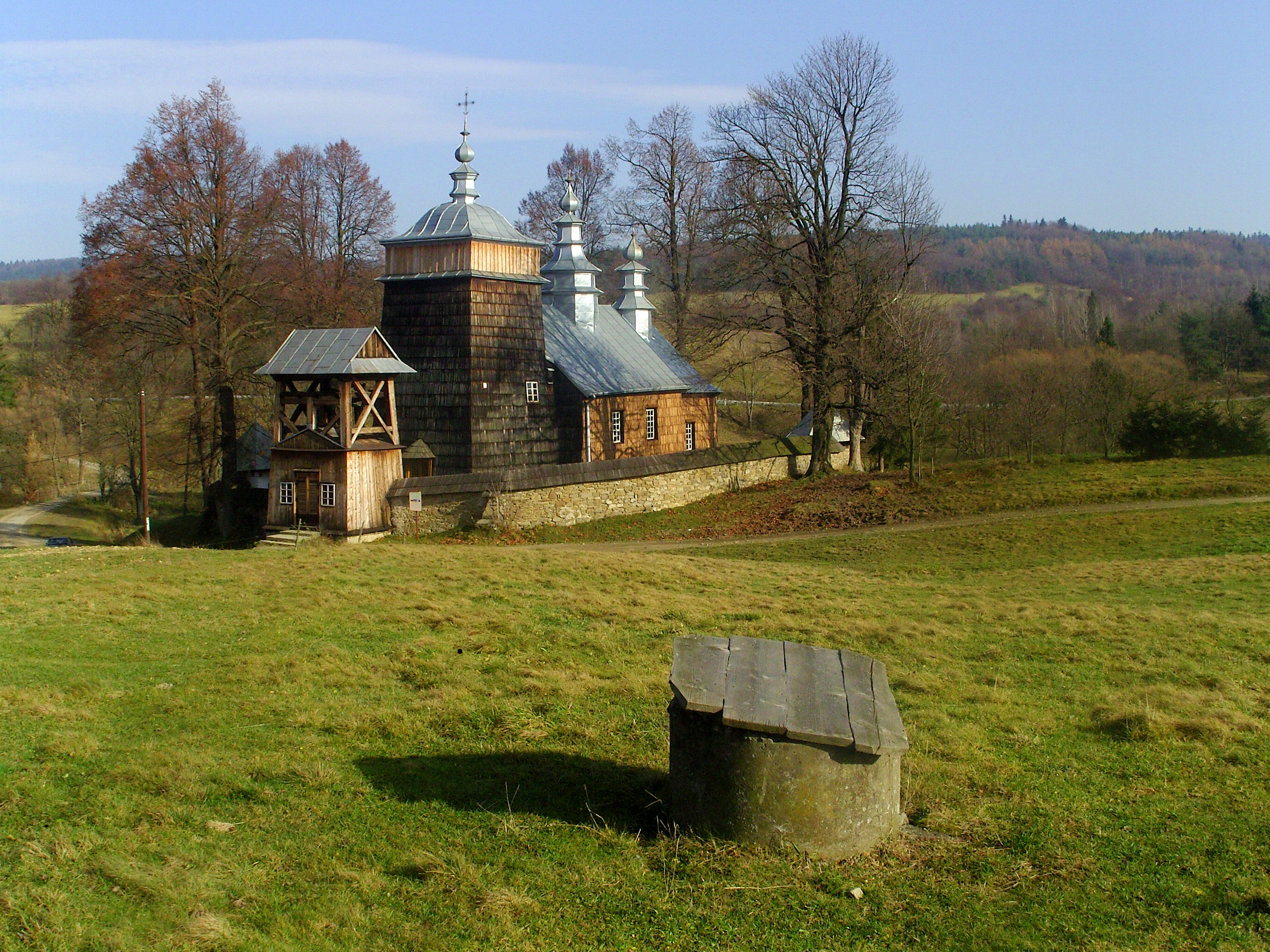
- Orthodox church
- Interactive map of Zdynia
- Location within Poland
- Coordinates: 49°29′N 21°17′E
- Country: Poland
- Voivodeship: Lesser Poland
- County: Gorlice
- Gmina: Uście Gorlickie
- Elevation: 500–550 m (1,640–1,800 ft)
- Population: 220

Zdynia [ˈzdɨɲa] (Note: Lemko Rusyn: Ждиня, romanized: Zdynia) is a village in the administrative district of Gmina Uście Gorlickie, within Gorlice County, Lesser Poland Voivodeship, in southern Poland, close to the border with Slovakia.

Zdynia is the site of an annual festival of Lemko culture. The village is located between mountains of Beskid Niski on the way of walking and cycle paths. It is also a place of one of the largest in Poland motorcycle gatherings.

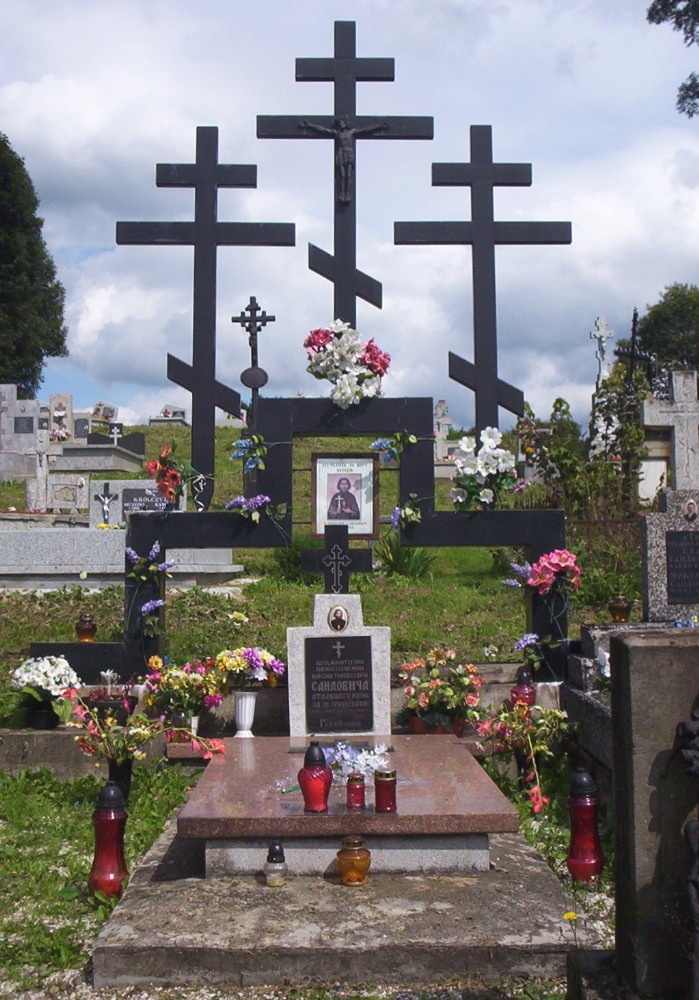
Grave of Maksym Sandowycz
