= Konieczna =

Village in Lesser Poland Voivodeship, Poland

- Village
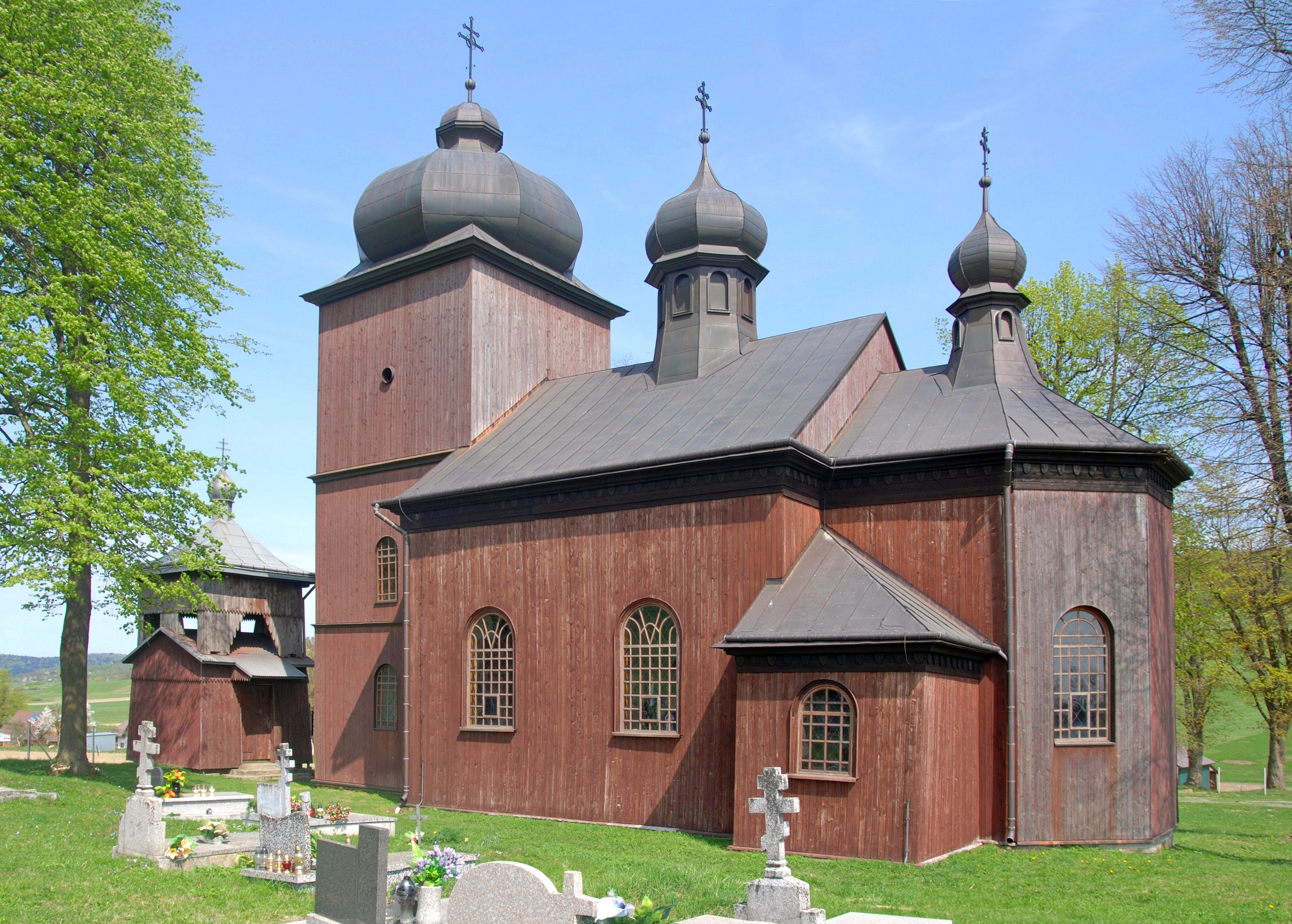
- Church of Saint Basil
- Interactive map of Konieczna
- Location within Poland
- Coordinates: 49°28′N 21°19′E
- Country: Poland
- Voivodeship: Lesser Poland
- County: Gorlice
- Gmina: Uście Gorlickie

Population
  - Total: 50

Konieczna ([kɔˈɲɛt͡ʂna]; Rusyn: Конечна, romanized: Konečna) is a village in the administrative district of Gmina Uście Gorlickie, within Gorlice County, Lesser Poland Voivodeship, in southern Poland, close to the border with Slovakia.
