= Blechnarka =

Village in Lesser Poland Voivodeship, Poland

- Village
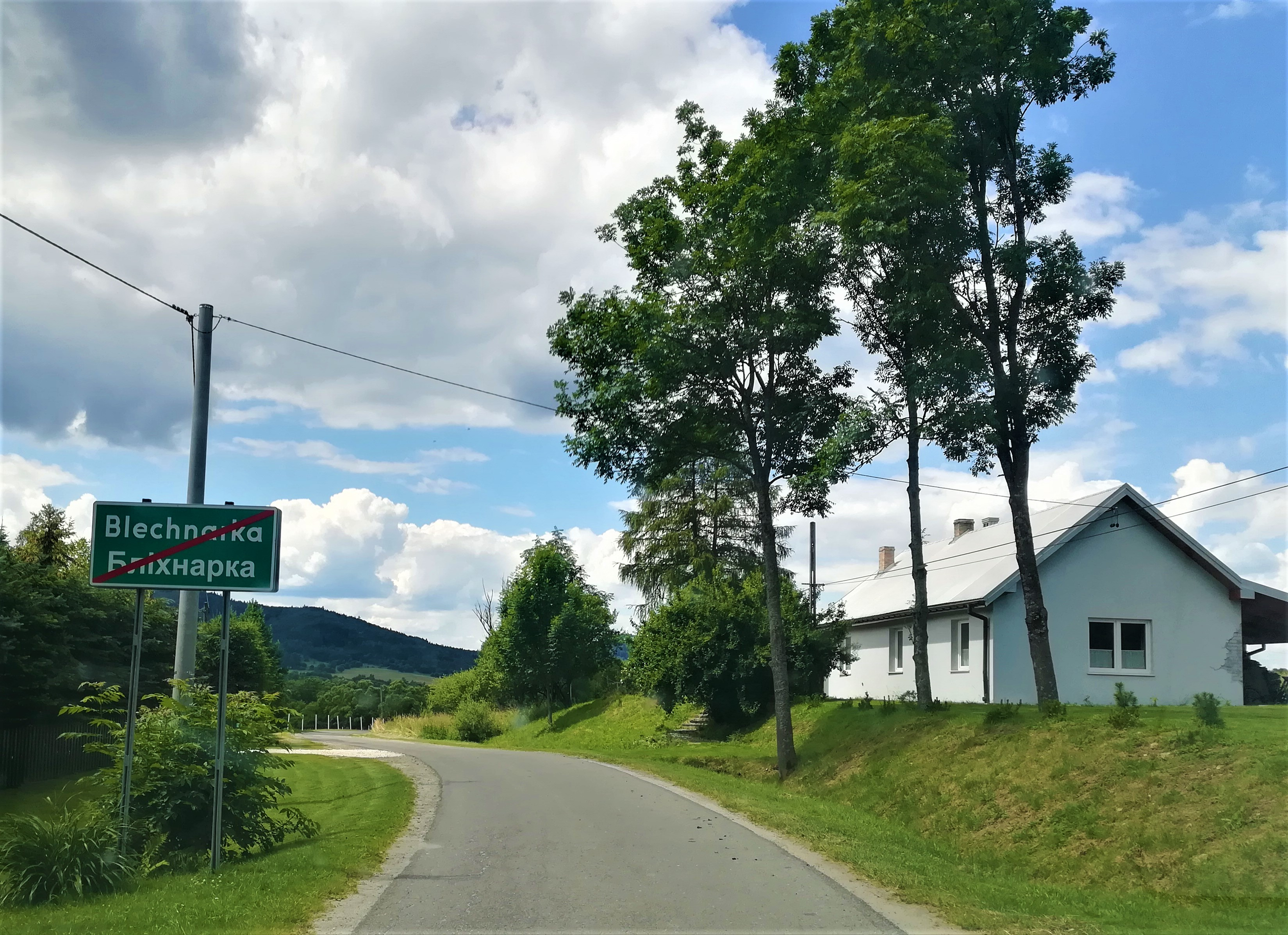

- Location within Poland
- Coordinates: 49°26′N 21°12′E
- Country: Poland
- Voivodeship: Lesser Poland
- County: Gorlice
- Gmina: Uście Gorlickie
- Population: 40

Blechnarka ([blɛxˈnarka]; Rusyn: Бліхнарка, romanized: Blichnarka) is a village in the administrative district of Gmina Uście Gorlickie, within Gorlice County, Lesser Poland Voivodeship, in southern Poland, close to the border with Slovakia.
