= Uście Gorlickie =

- Village
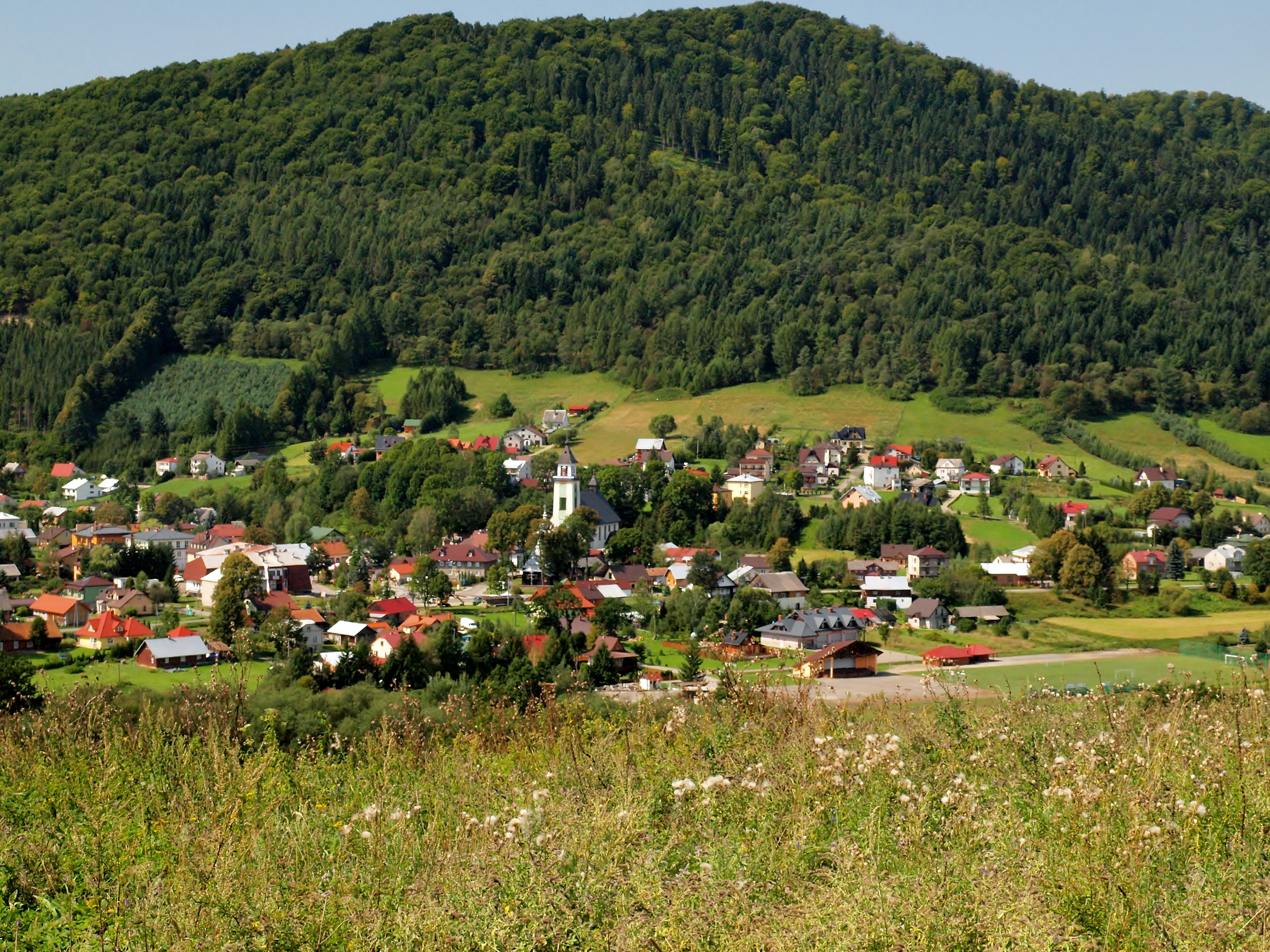
- Uście Gorlickie

- Location within Poland
- Coordinates: 49°31′18″N 21°8′19″E
- Country: Poland
- Voivodeship: Lesser Poland
- County: Gorlice
- Gmina: Uście Gorlickie
- Population: 1,100

Uście Gorlickie [ˈuɕt͡ɕɛ ɡɔrˈlʲit͡skʲɛ] is a village in Gorlice County, Lesser Poland Voivodeship, in southern Poland, close to the border with Slovakia. It is the seat of the gmina (administrative district) called Gmina Uście Gorlickie.
