= Gmina Uście Gorlickie =

Gmina Uście Gorlickie Uście Gorlickie Commune
- Gmina
- Coat of arms
- Interactive map of Gmina Uście Gorlickie
- Coordinates (Uście Gorlickie): 49°31′18″N 21°8′19″E
- Country: Poland
- Voivodeship: Lesser Poland
- County: Gorlice
- Seat: Uście Gorlickie

Area
  - Total: 287.41 km^{2} (110.97 sq mi)

Population (2006)
  - Total: 6,259
  - Density: 21.78/km^{2} (56.40/sq mi)
- Website: http://www.usciegorlickie.iap.pl

Gmina Uście Gorlickie is a rural gmina (administrative district) in Gorlice County, Lesser Poland Voivodeship, in southern Poland, on the Slovak border. Its seat is the village of Uście Gorlickie, which lies approximately 15 kilometres (9 mi) south of Gorlice and 106 km (66 mi) south-east of the regional capital Kraków.

The gmina covers an area of 287.41 square kilometres (111.0 sq mi), and as of 2006 its total population is 6,259.

== Villages ==
Gmina Uście Gorlickie contains the villages and settlements of Banica, Blechnarka, Brunary, Czarna, Hańczowa, Huta Wysowska, Izby, Konieczna, Kunkowa, Kwiatoń, Leszczyny, Nowica, Oderne, Przysłup, Regietów, Ropki, Skwirtne, Smerekowiec, Śnietnica, Stawisza, Uście Gorlickie, Wysowa-Zdrój and Zdynia.

== Neighbouring gminas ==
Gmina Uście Gorlickie is bordered by the gminas of Gorlice, Grybów, Krynica-Zdrój, Ropa and Sękowa. It also borders Slovakia.
