= Hryhorivka =

Hryhorivka (Ukrainian: Григорівка) may refer to any of dozens of settlements in Ukraine:

== Rural settlements ==
- Hryhorivka, Solonytsivka settlement hromada, Kharkiv Raion, Kharkiv Oblast — formerly Manuilivka
- Hryhorivka, Pohrebyshche urban hromada, Vinnytsia Raion, Vinnytsia Oblast

== Villages ==
- Hryhorivka, Bobrytsia rural hromada, Cherkasy Raion, Cherkasy Oblast — formerly Hryhoriev
- Hryhorivka, Chornobai settlement hromada, Zolotonosha Raion, Cherkasy Oblast
- Hryhorivka, Bakhmach urban hromada, Nizhyn Raion, Chernihiv Oblast
- Hryhorivka, Makiivka rural hromada, Nizhyn Raion, Chernihiv Oblast
- Hryhorivka, Yantarne silrada, Kurman Raion, the Crimea — formerly Mamek
- Hryhorivka, Novopokrovka settlement hromada, Dnipro Raion, Dnipropetrovsk Oblast
- Hryhorivka, Lykhivka settlement hromada, Kamianske Raion, Dnipropetrovsk Oblast
- Hryhorivka, Shyroke settlement hromada, Kryvyi Rih Raion, Dnipropetrovsk Oblast
- Hryhorivka, Chasiv Yar urban hromada, Bakhmut Raion, Donetsk Oblast
- Hryhorivka, Siversk urban hromada, Bakhmut Raion, Donetsk Oblast
- Hryhorivka, Amvrosiivka urban hromada, Donetsk Raion, Donetsk Oblast
- Hryhorivka, Ilovaisk urban hromada, Donetsk Raion, Donetsk Oblast
- Hryhorivka, Boikivske settlement hromada, Kalmiuske Raion, Donetsk Oblast — formerly Neu-Prinzfeld, Frühling, Prinzfeld, Fedorivka
- Hryhorivka, Selydove urban hromada, Pokrovsk Raion, Donetsk Oblast — formerly Lenine, Leninske
- Hryhorivka, Kolomak settlement hromada, Bohodukhiv Raion, Kharkiv Oblast
- Hryhorivka, Barvinkove urban hromada, Izium Raion, Kharkiv Oblast
- Hryhorivka, Velykyi Burluk settlement hromada, Kupiansk Raion, Kharkiv Oblast
- Hryhorivka, Blyzniuky settlement hromada, Lozova Raion, Kharkiv Oblast
- Hryhorivka, Prysyvashshia rural hromada, Kakhovka Raion, Kherson Oblast
- Hryhorivka, Starokostiantyniv urban hromada, Khmelnytskyi Raion, Khmelnytskyi Oblast
- Hryhorivka, Sakhnivtsi rural hromada, Shepetivka Raion, Khmelnytskyi Oblast
- Hryhorivka, Adzhamka rural hromada, Kropyvnytskyi Raion, Kirovohrad Oblast
- Hryhorivka, Oleksandrivka settlement hromada, Kropyvnytskyi Raion, Kirovohrad Oblast
- Hryhorivka, Hannivka rural hromada, Novoukrainka Raion, Kirovohrad Oblast — formerly Kosiurova, Kosiurykha
- Hryhorivka, Velyka Andrusivka rural hromada, Oleksandriia Raion, Kirovohrad Oblast
- Hryhorivka, Nova Praha settlement hromada, Oleksandriia Raion, Kirovohrad Oblast
- Hryhorivka, Tetiiv urban hromada, Bila Tserkva Raion, Kyiv Oblast
- Hryhorivka, Boryspil urban hromada, Boryspil Raion, Kyiv Oblast
- Hryhorivka, Yahotyn urban hromada, Boryspil Raion, Kyiv Oblast
- Hryhorivka, Berezan urban hromada, Brovary Raion, Kyiv Oblast
- Hryhorivka, Obukhiv urban hromada, Obukhiv Raion, Kyiv Oblast
- Hryhorivka, Novyi Buh urban hromada, Bashtanka Raion, Mykolaiv Oblast
- Hryhorivka, Novomarivka rural hromada, Voznesensk Raion, Mykolaiv Oblast
- Hryhorivka, Veselynove settlement hromada, Voznesensk Raion, Mykolaiv Oblast
- Hryhorivka, Yelanets settlement hromada, Voznesensk Raion, Mykolaiv Oblast
- Hryhorivka, Yuzhne urban hromada, Odesa Raion, Odesa Oblast
- Hryhorivka, Dolynske rural hromada, Podilsk Raion, Odesa Oblast
- Hryhorivka, Hrebinka urban hromada, Lubny Raion, Poltava Oblast — formerly Storozhenkivskyi, Khranevshchyna
- Hryhorivka, Khorol urban hromada, Lubny Raion, Poltava Oblast
- Hryhorivka, Komyshnia settlement hromada, Myrhorod Raion, Poltava Oblast
- Hryhorivka, Kobeliaky urban hromada, Poltava Raion, Poltava Oblast
- Hryhorivka, Mashivka settlement hromada, Poltava Raion, Poltava Oblast
- Hryhorivka, Mohyliv-Podilskyi urban hromada, Mohyliv-Podilskyi Raion, Vinnytsia Oblast
- Hryhorivka, Polohy urban hromada, Polohy Raion, Zaporizhzhia Oblast — formerly Novohryhorivka
- Hryhorivka, Novooleksandrivka rural hromada, Zaporizhzhia Raion, Zaporizhzhia Oblast — formerly Kinskovodivka

== Former settlements and former names of settlements ==
- Hryhorivka — former village in Pryvillia silrada, Sloviansk Raion, Donetsk Oblast, Ukrainian Soviet Socialist Republic; disincorporated in 1987
- Hryhorivka — former khutir in Krasne silrada, Kehychivka Raion, Kharkiv Oblast, Ukrainian Soviet Socialist Republic; now a part of Vilne
- (Stara) Hryhorivka — a former village in Stalino miskrada, Stalino Oblast, Ukrainian Soviet Socialist Republic; now a residential area in Leninskyi District, Donetsk
- Hryhorivka — former khutir in Tsyhanivka silrada, Troitske Raion, Voroshylovhrad Oblast, Ukrainian Soviet Socialist Republic; disincorporated somewhen 1947–1972
- Hryhorivka — former name (1926–2024) of Bunchuzhne
- Hryhorivka — former name (1928–2016) of Mylnyky
- Hryhorivka — former name (1796–1968) of Zarichne
- Kniaze-Hryhorivka — former name (1784–2004) of Kozatska Sloboda

== See also ==
- Balka Hryhorivka — a river in Ukraine
- Gregorowce — a village in Poland
- Grigorăuca — two villages and a commune in Moldova
- Grigorievca — a village in Moldova
- Grigorovka — four hamlets in Russia
- Grigoryevka — numerous settlements in Russia
- Grzegorzówka — a village in Poland
- Hruzka Hryhorivka — a village in Ukraine
- Hryharaŭka — a pasyalak in Belarus
- Hryhoriv — two villages in Ukraine
- Hryhorivske — two villages in Ukraine
- Nova Hryhorivka — three settlements in Ukraine
- Novohryhorivka — numerous settlements in Ukraine
- Oleksandro-Hryhorivka — a village in Ukraine
- Pavlo-Hryhorivka — a village in Ukraine
- Taraso-Hryhorivka — two villages in Ukraine
