= Polish road signs typeface =

Geometric sans-serif typeface

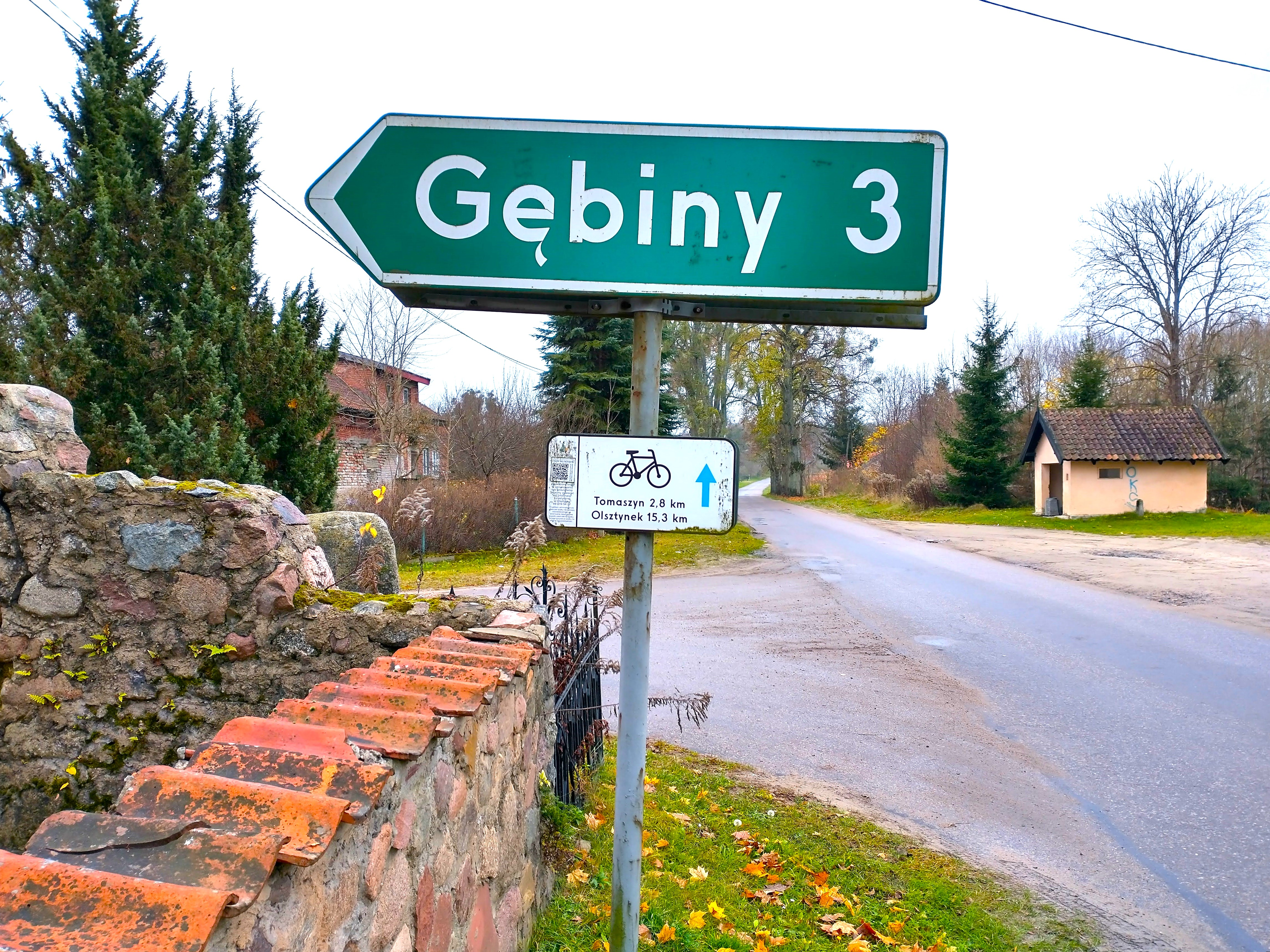
Road sign near Olsztynek

The Polish road signs typeface (Polish: Polskie liternictwo znaków drogowych) is a geometrical typeface designed for use on Polish road signs, according to Attachment 1 of Regulation on detailed technical conditions for road signs and signals as well as road safety devices and conditions for their placement on roads. The regulation defines a construction of digits, all of the letters of Polish alphabet and the letter V (not including Q and X), and the punctuation marks: hyphen, round brackets, comma, full stop (period) and exclamation mark.

The typeface was created by Marek Sigmund, whose project, commissioned by the state authorities in 1975, was to replace the former road signage typeface while the Instruction about road signs and signals (Polish: Instrukcja o znakach i sygnałach drogowych) was being implemented. The typeface was designed in six weeks. According to the designer's assumptions, the typeface included creating text on boards by using the freehand and stencil techniques.

Sigmund's specifications included glyphs that appear cut-off or oversized (such as the flat right edge on lowercase "e" and capital "G") and a purely geometric approach to letter design; in general, Polish signage uses large letters to ensure readability.

== Digitized versions ==
Sample of Drogowskaz typeface

There are five fonts that imitate the road signs typeface. Two of them are available as non-commercial freeware and one is available as free and open source:

- Liternictwo Drogowe – distributed by the company Centrum Rozwoju Explotrans S.A., which cooperates with Ministry of Infrastructure. It completely matches the Regulation, and is meant mainly for the enterprises that produce road signs.
- Tablica drogowa – created in 2001 by Grzegorz Klimczewski. This version has all the glyphs that are defined in the Regulation and also additional ones (including Q and X letters). Some unused glyphs, such as (quotation mark, question mark, percent sign), have been replaced by arrows. At first, the font was distributed commercially, but currently it is non-commercial freeware.
- Drogowskaz – created in 2006 by Emil Wojtacki. Apart from the glyphs defined in the Regulation, it includes many more, designed in style of the original typeface, such as scribal abbreviations and diacritics used in various languages. The font is distributed as non-commercial freeware.
- W droge — created in 2011 by Open Source Publishing, a secondhand tracing of the typeface from real-world signage in Wrocław. It is distributed under a permissive free software license.
- Sigmund Pro — created in 2022 by Mateusz Machalski inspired from Polish road signage typeface and had 9 weights (Thin, Extra Light, Ultra Light, Light, Regular, Medium, Semi Bold, Bold, Heavy) with italics.

== Gallery ==
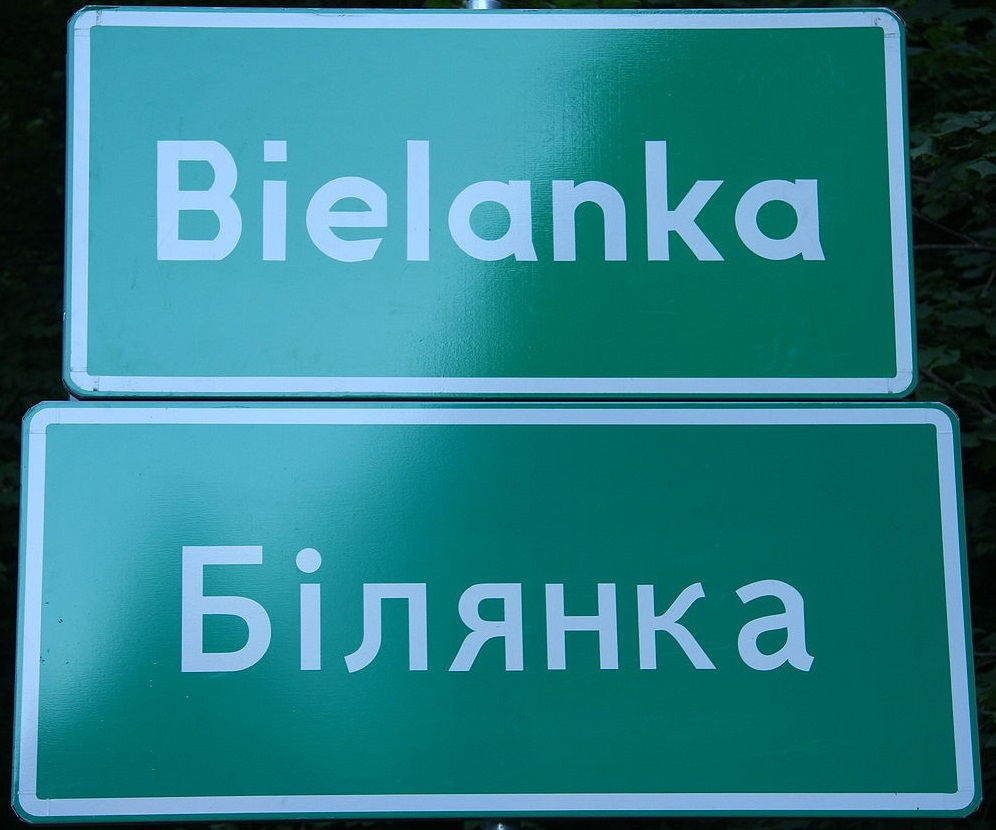
Polish and Lemko bilingual place-name sign in Bielanka

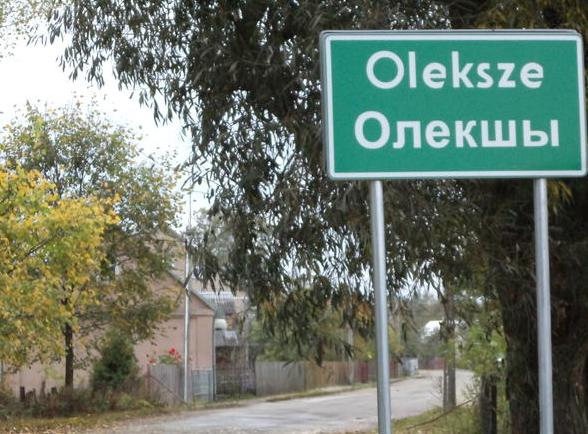
Polish and Belarusian bilingual place-name sign in Oleksze

Former road sign IIA-20 "stop — customs control" in Polish and Russian, used on Poland–Soviet Union border crossings.

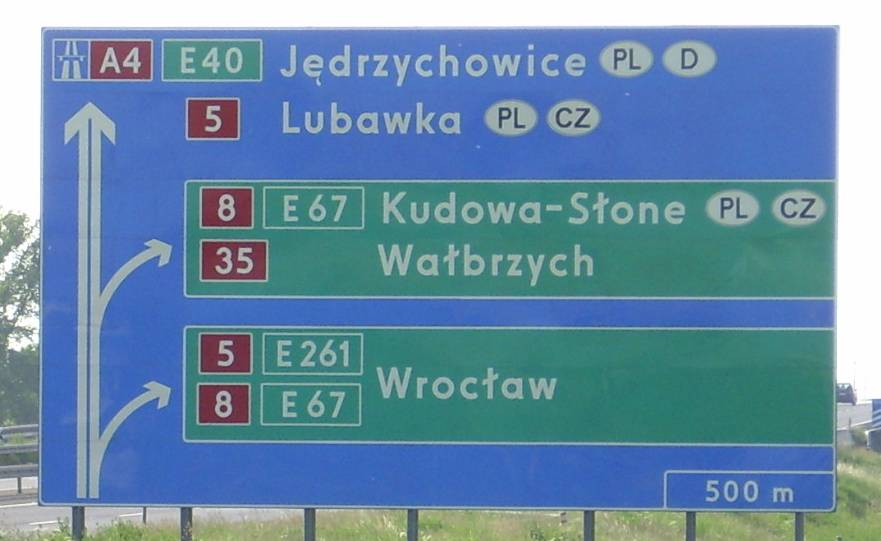
Road sign on the A4 motorway near Ślęza, Lower Silesian Voivodeship
