= Jan Walenty Węgierski =

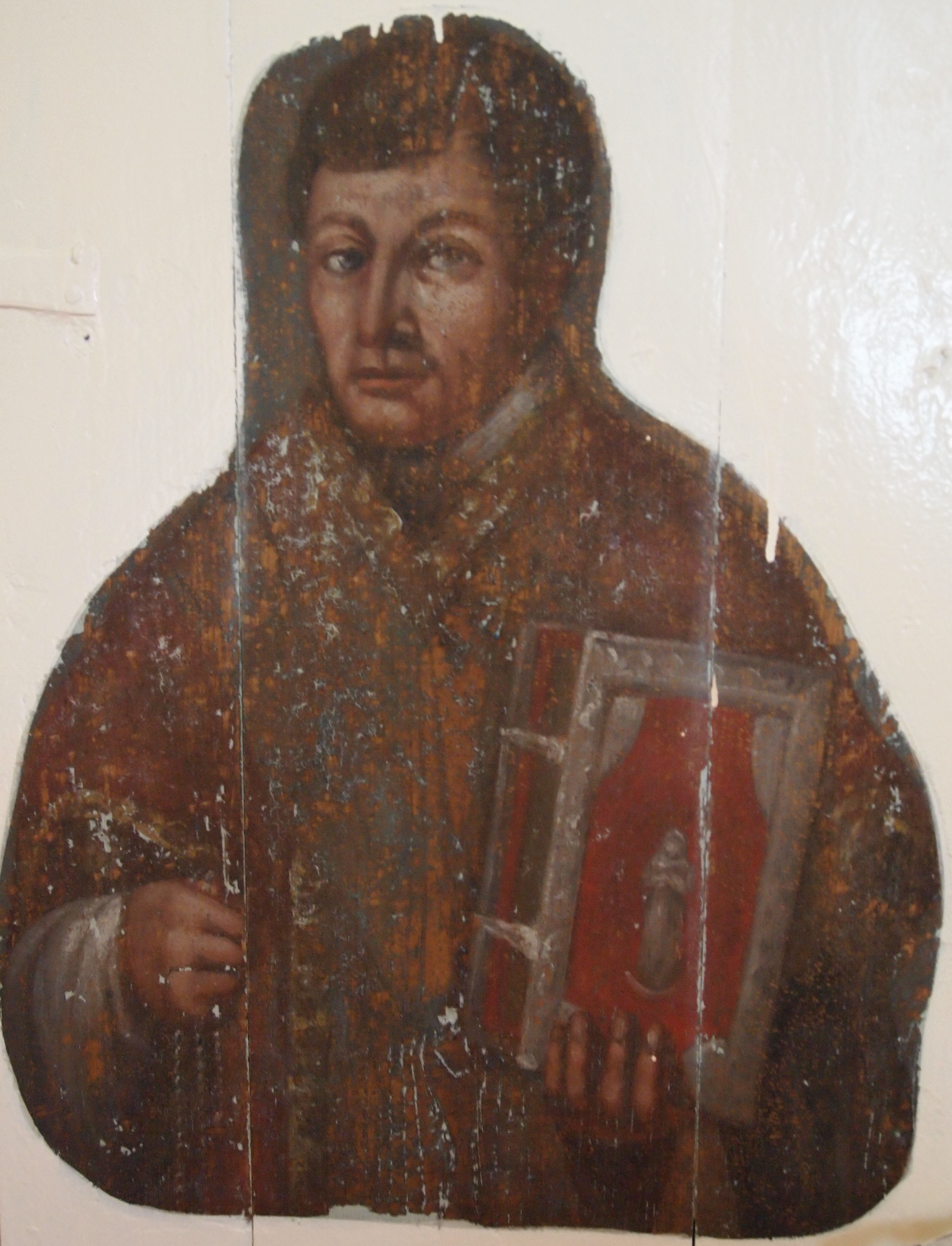
The supposed portrait of Jan Walenty Węgierski in XVIII c. church of John the Baptist in Szczyty-Dzięciołowo, Poland

Jan Walenty Węgierski (1755–1796), of Wieniawa Coat of Arms, was a Deputy Chancellor (podkanclerz) and Chamberlain of last king of Poland, Stanisław August Poniatowski. He was a member of the Great Sejm and supporter of Kościuszko Insurrection.

Owner of Szczyty-Dzięciołowo, Szczyty-Nowodwory and Hrabniak, he sponsored the construction of several Eastern Orthodox Churches in Podlasie Voivodeship.

Son of Andrzej Węgierski and Ewa Niedzwiecka. He had one son, who died as an infant. In 1796 he adopted a son of his nephew, Antoni Wiewiórowski, who inherited all of his possessions.
