= Walenty =

Walenty is a given name. Notable people with the name include:

- Jan Walenty Tomaka (born 1949), Polish politician
- Jan Walenty Węgierski (1755–1796), Deputy Chancellor and Chamberlain of last king of Poland
- Walenty Czarnecki (1941–2020), Polish footballer
- Walenty Dembiński (died 1585), Chancellor of Poland
- Walenty Dymek (1888–1956), Archbishop of Poznań
- Walenty Kłyszejko (1909–1987), Estonian-Polish basketball player, coach, and professor at the Józef Piłsudski University, Warsaw
- Walenty Łukawski (c. 1743–1773), Polish nobleman who led the abduction of King Stanisław August Poniatowski
- Walenty Musielak (1913–1977), Polish soccer player
- Walenty Pytel (born 1941), Polish born contemporary artist and metal sculptor
- Walenty Stefański (1813–1877), Polish bookseller, political activist, co-founder of the Polish League
- Walenty Wańkowicz (1799–1842), Polish painter
- Walenty Żebrowski (died 1765), notable 18th-century Polish painter and a member of the Bernardine order
- Walenty Ziętara (born 1948), Polish ice hockey player
