= Topczykały =

- Village
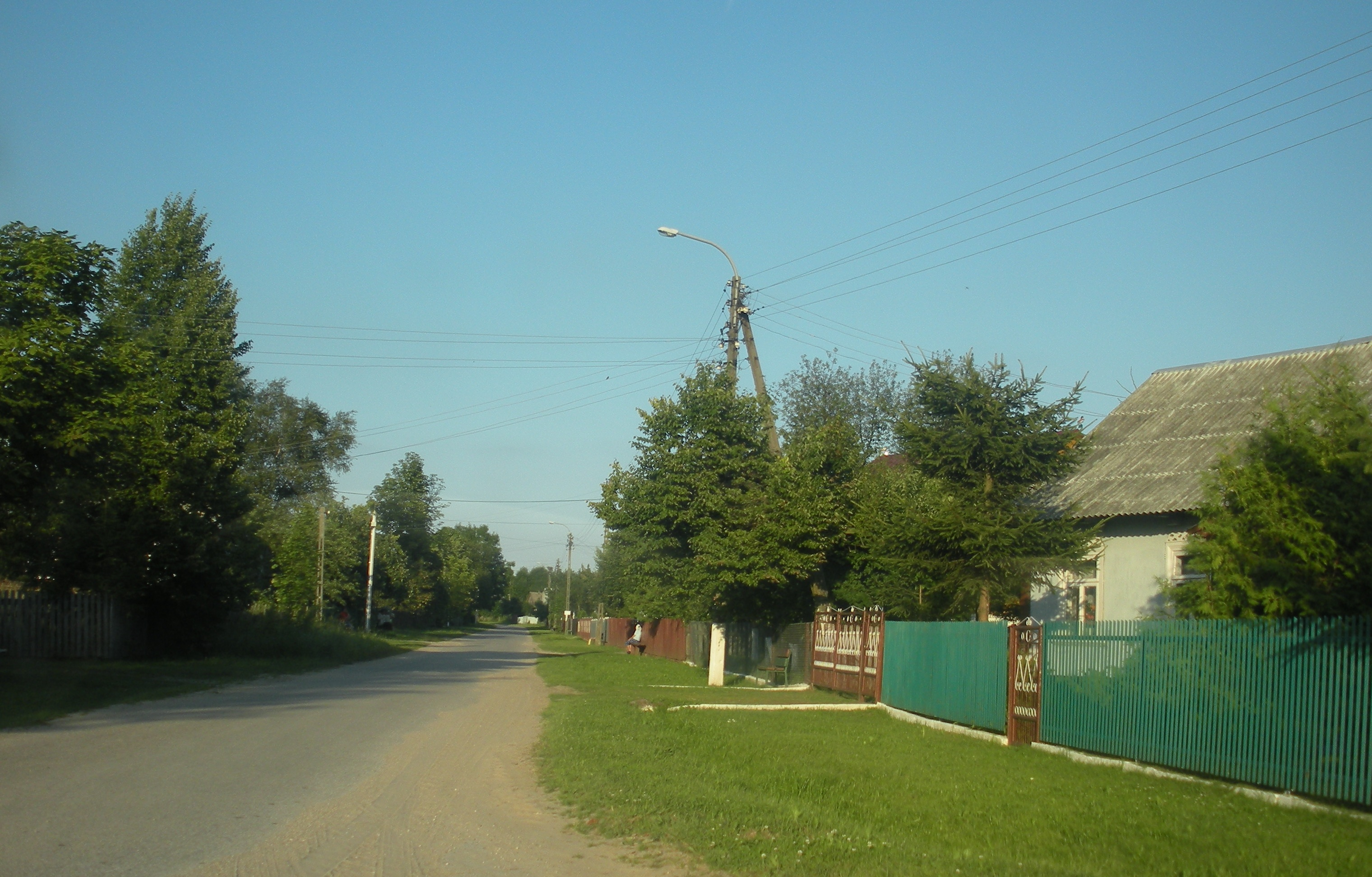

- Location within Poland
- Coordinates: 52°42′N 23°16′E
- Country: Poland
- Voivodeship: Podlaskie
- County: Bielsk
- Gmina: Orla

Topczykały [tɔpt͡ʂɨˈkawɨ] is a village in the administrative district of Gmina Orla, within Bielsk County, Podlaskie Voivodeship, in north-eastern Poland.

According to the 1921 census, the village was inhabited by 175 people, among whom 171 were Orthodox, and 4 Mosaic. At the same time, 171 inhabitants declared Belarusian nationality, 4 Jewish. There were 61 residential buildings in the village.

It is in one of five Polish/Belarusian bilingual Gmina in Podlaskie Voivodeship regulated by the Act of 6 January 2005 on National and Ethnic Minorities and on the Regional Languages, which permits certain gminas with significant linguistic minorities to introduce a second, auxiliary language to be used in official contexts alongside Polish.
