= Pawlinowo =

- Village
- Location within Poland
- Coordinates: 52°37′N 23°13′E
- Country: Poland
- Voivodeship: Podlaskie
- County: Bielsk
- Gmina: Orla

Pawlinowo [pavliˈnɔvɔ] is a village in the administrative district of Gmina Orla, within Bielsk County, Podlaskie Voivodeship, in north-eastern Poland.

According to the 1921 census, the village was inhabited by 53 people, among whom 3 were Roman Catholic, 44 Orthodox, and 6 Mosaic. At the same time, 16 inhabitants declared Polish nationality, 27 Belarusian, 6 Jewish and 4 different. There were 11 residential buildings in the village.

It is in one of five Polish/Belarusian bilingual Gmina in Podlaskie Voivodeship regulated by the Act of 6 January 2005 on National and Ethnic Minorities and on the Regional Languages, which permits certain gminas with significant linguistic minorities to introduce a second, auxiliary language to be used in official contexts alongside Polish.
