= Koszele, Podlaskie Voivodeship =

Koszele
- Village
- Location within Poland
- Coordinates: 52°42′0″N 23°19′20″E
- Country: Poland
- Voivodeship: Podlaskie
- County: Bielsk
- Gmina: Orla
- Time zone: UTC+1 (CET)
  - Summer (DST): UTC+2 (CEST)

Koszele [kɔˈʂɛlɛ] is a village in the administrative district of Gmina Orla, within Bielsk County, Podlaskie Voivodeship, in north-eastern Poland.

It is in one of the five Polish/Belarusian bilingual Gmina in Podlaskie Voivodeship regulated by the Act of 6 January 2005 on National and Ethnic Minorities and on the Regional Languages, which permits certain gminas with significant linguistic minorities to introduce a second, auxiliary language to be used in official contexts alongside Polish.

== History ==
Three Polish citizens were murdered by Nazi Germany in the village during World War II.
