= Road signs in Poland =

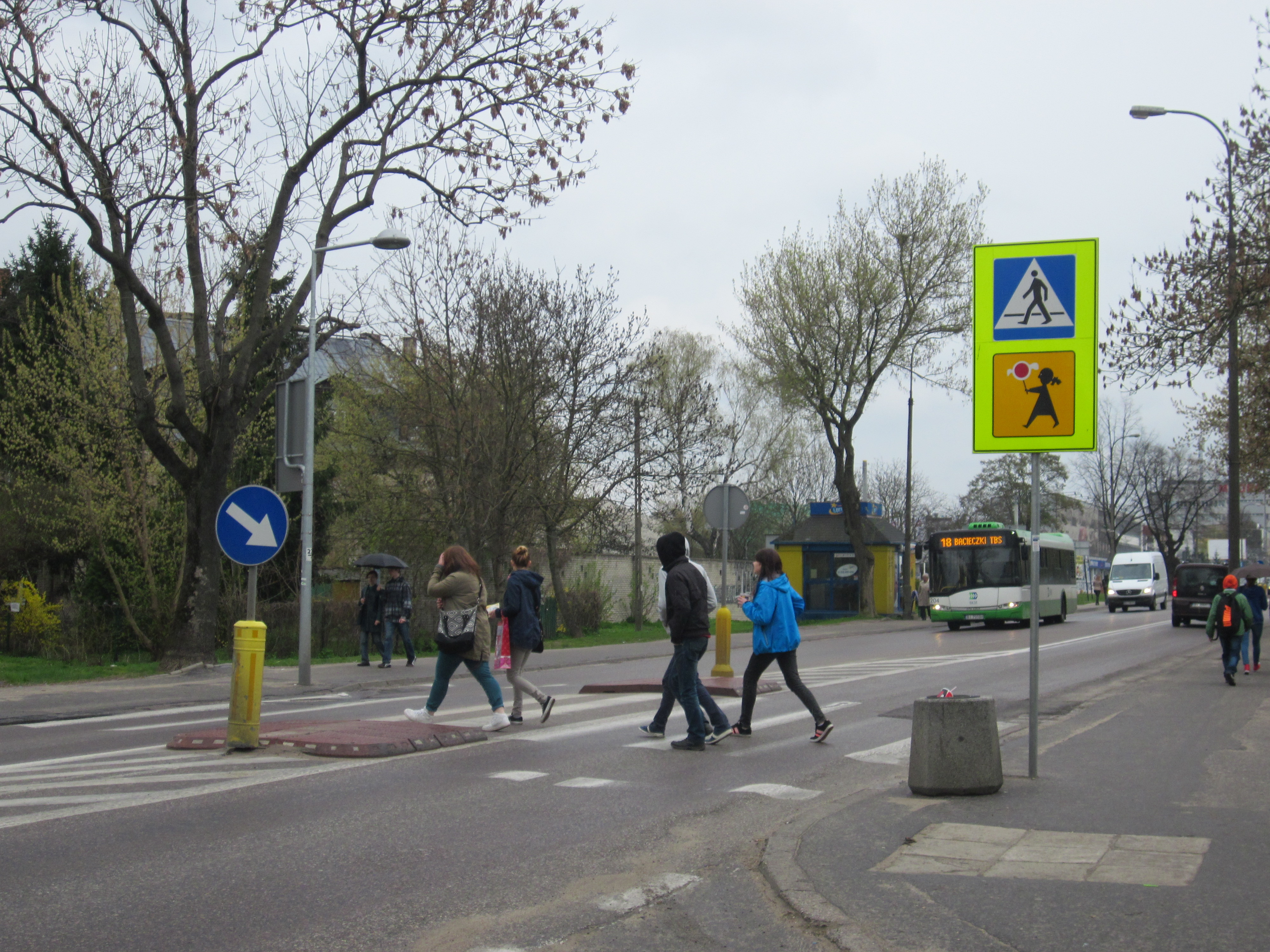
Pedestrian crossing in Bialystok

The design of road signs in Poland is regulated by Regulation of the Ministers of Infrastructure and Interior Affairs and Administration on road signs and signals. The Annex 1 to the regulation describes conditions related to usage of the road signs – size, visibility, colors and light reflections, typeface and text, criteria of choosing the type of foil to signs faces, colorful specimens and schematics.

Road signs are divided into two categories – "vertical" (znaki pionowe) and "horizontal" (znaki poziome). The "vertical" signs (triangular, circular or rectangular) are placed on the side of the road or over the road. The "horizontal" ones are simply road markings painted on the carriageway, usually with white paint. Yellow paint is used in temporary situations, mostly during road work. It has higher priority than white paint.

Road signs in Poland follow the Vienna Convention on Road Signs and Signals and, therefore, are more or less identical to those in other European countries. Warning signs have yellow background rather than the more common black-on-white design, and therefore are similar to the road signs in Greece. Poland signed the Vienna Convention on November 8, 1968 and ratified it on August 23, 1984.

Polish road signs depict people with stylized (as opposed to naturalistic) silhouettes.

Meaning of the traffic signals and their usage is described in another regulation. Traffic signals are placed on the right side of the road, on the left side or over the carriageway. There are three types of traffic signals:

- signals made by traffic lights
- signals made by authorised personnel
- sound signals or vibrative

== Vertical signs ==
There are seven types of "vertical signs":

1. Warning signs (znaki ostrzegawcze; type A) – triangular with the tip pointed upwards (with exception of sign A-7, where its tip is pointed downwards – it provides clear meaning of the sign even during the reduced readability or when looking on it from behind), with red border. The symbols are black on yellow background, with exception of sign A-29 which presents a three-colored traffic signals
2. Prohibition signs (znaki zakazu; type B) – circular with red border. Black (in some cases colorful) symbol on white background (exceptions: sign B-20 "STOP", which has an octagonal shape – it also provides clear meaning even during reduced readability or when looking on it from behind; signs B-39, B-40 and B-44 are rectangular). In case of the signs that cancel specific restrictions the symbol is grey and crossed out by thick black diagonal line.
3. Mandatory signs (znaki nakazu; type C) – circular, with a white symbol on blue background. The exception is C-17 sign (mandatory direction for vehicles carrying dangerous materials) which is placed on white rectangular board.
4. Information signs (znaki informacyjne; type D) – rectangular, blue (or with a white square on blue background) with a white, black or colorful symbol. There are few exceptions: D-1 and D-2 signs which are yellow on white background; additionally one of tips is pointed upwards to give the clear meaning like with A-7 and B-20 signs. D-42 to D-47 signs are big white rectangles.
5. Directional signs (znaki kierunku i miejscowości; type E) – these signs have different shapes and colors, depending on the situation and placement.
6. Complementary signs (znaki uzupełniające; type F) – big rectangular or square signs with blue or yellow background. These signs mostly inform about traffic order or approaching restrictions and dangers.
7. Complementary plates (tabliczki do znaków drogowych; type T) – small rectangular signs, mostly with white or yellow background, with black text or symbol. These are placed under main sign, extending its meaning.

Depending on road type there are five groups of size:

- large (wielkie; W) – used only on motorways
- big (duże; D) – used on expressways, dual carriageway roads outside the built-up area and on roads inside the built-up area with maximum speed higher than 60 kilometres per hour (37 mph)
- medium (średnie; S) – used on motorway slip roads, expressway slip roads, national roads, voivodeship roads and powiat roads, with exception of directional signs
- small (małe; M) – used on gmina roads and as directional signs on powiat roads
- mini (MI) – used on traffic bollards, directional signs and inside the built-up areas when it's impossible to use larger signs or it would reduce visibility of pedestrians and on narrow streets.

The most used size of road signs in Poland, defined in Regulation as medium, is in case of circular with diameter of 80 centimetres (31 in); in case of triangular the length of one of edges has 90 centimetres (35 in); in case of square or rectangular one of square edges or shorter edge of rectangle has 60 centimetres (24 in).

Dimensions of directional signs are depending on size of letters, type and size of symbols and also by length and number of locality names.

To provide proper visibility and readability of road signs, the faces are made with reflective materials. Type of used material is dependent on road category.

=== Warning signs ===
Warning signs

A-1 "dangerous curve to the right"

A-2 "dangerous curve to the left"

A-3 "dangerous curves — first to the right"

A-4 "dangerous curves — first to the left"

A-5 "intersection — uncontrolled intersection"
(yield to vehicles coming from the right)

A-6a "intersection with side roads on both sides of the road"
Drivers on the side roads have to yield

A-6b "intersection with a side road from the right"
Drivers on the side road have to yield

A-6c "intersection with a side road from the left"
Drivers on the side road have to yield

A-6d "entry of the one-way road from the right"
Drivers on the side road have to yield

A-6e "entry of the one-way road from the left"
Drivers on the side road have to yield

A-7 "give way"

A-8 "roundabout"

A-9 "railroad crossing with barriers ahead"

A-10 "railroad crossing ahead"

A-11 "uneven road"

A-11a "speed bump"

A-12a "road narrows — two-sided"

A-12b "road narrows — on the right"

A-12c "road narrows — on the left"

A-13 "moveable bridge"

A-14 "roadworks area"

A-15 "slippery road surface"

A-16 " pedestrian crossing ahead"
(formerly used)

A-16 "pedestrian crossing ahead" (other version)

A-17 "children"

A-18a "farm animals" (the animal may not react)

A-18b "wild animals" (the animal may react unpredictably)

A-19 "crosswinds"

A-20 "road stretch with two-way traffic"

A-21 "tramway"

A-22 "dangerous incline downwards"

A-23 "steep incline upwards"

A-24 "cyclists"

A-25 "falling rock debris"

A-26 "airport"

A-27 "wharf or river shoreline"

A-28 "crumbly gravel"

A-29 "traffic lights ahead"

A-30 "other danger"
(formerly used)

A-31 "dangerous shoulder"

A-31 "dangerous shoulder" – version placed on the left side

A-32 "frost-covered carriageway"

A-33 "traffic congestion"

A-34 "traffic accident"

=== Prohibitory signs ===
Prohibitory signs

B-1 "no movement in both directions"

B-2 "no entry"

B-3 "no entry for motor vehicles, except one-track motorcycles"

B-4 "no entry for motorcycles"

B-3a "no entry for buses"

B-5 "no entry for trucks"

B-5 "no entry for trucks" (variant – having a gross vehicle weight rating exceeding [...] tonnes)

B-6 "no entry for tractors and slow-running vehicles"

B-7 "no entry for motor vehicles with trailer"

B-7 "no entry for motor vehicles with trailer" (variant – having a gross trailer weight rating exceeding [...] tonnes)

B-8 "no entry for horse-drawn vehicles"

B-9 "no entry for bicycles"

B-10 "no entry for mopeds"

B-11 "no entry for bicycle carts"

B-12 "no entry for handcarts"

B-13 "no entry for vehicles carrying explosive or easily combustible goods"

B-13a "no entry for vehicles carrying hazardous goods"

B-14 "no entry for vehicles carrying goods liable to pollute water"

B-15 "no entry for vehicles having an overall width exceeding [...] meters"

B-16 "no entry for vehicles having an overall height exceeding [...] meters"

B-17 "no entry for vehicles having a length exceeding [...] meters"

B-18 "no entry for vehicles having a gross weight exceeding [...] tonnes"

B-19 "no entry for vehicles with a single axle load exceeding [...] tonnes"

B-20 "stop"
(Mandatory stop)
(formerly used)

B-21 "no left turns"
(this sign prohibits also U-turns on the nearest intersection)

B-22 "no right turns"

B-23 "no U-turns"

B-24 "end of U-turns prohibition"

B-25 "no overtaking"

B-26 "no overtaking by trucks"

B-27 "end of overtaking prohibition"

B-28 "end of overtaking by trucks prohibition"

B-29 "no sound signals"

B-30 "end of sound signals prohibition"

B-31 "priority for oncoming drivers"
(one has to yield to oncoming drivers)

B-32 "stop — customs control" (multilingual)
(formerly used or or)

B-32a "border control"

B-32b "boom barrier failure"

B-32c "faulty signaling"

B-32d "ferry entrance"

B-32e "police control"

B-32f "toll collection"

B-34 "end of speed limit"

B-35 "no parking"

(variant of B-35 sign — no parking between the hours of [...] and [...])

(variant of B-35 sign — no parking for more than [...] minutes

(variant of B-35 sign — no parking for more than [...] minutes between the hours of [...] and [...])

B-36 "no stopping"

B-37 "no parking on odd-numbered days"

B-38 "no parking on even-numbered days"

B-39 "limited parking zone"
(with details — for example during weekdays between the hours of [...] and [...])
(formerly used and/or)

B-40 "end of limited parking zone"

B-41 "no entry for pedestrians"

B-42 "end of restrictions"
(except "no parking" and "no stopping" restrictions)

B-43 "limited speed zone"

B-44 "end of limited speed zone"

To eliminate some of the vehicle types from entering a specific road, two or exceptionally three symbols can be put on the sign, e.g.:

B-3/4 "no entry for motor vehicles"

B-6/8 "no entry for tractors and horse-drawn vehicles"

B-9/12 "no entry for bicycles or handcarts"

B-13/14 "no entry for vehicles carrying explosive or easily combustible goods and goods liable to pollute water"

B-3/4/10 "no entry for motor vehicles and mopeds"

B-6/8/9 "no entry for vehicles other than car-like vehicles"

=== Mandatory signs ===
Mandatory signs

C-1 "turn right before the sign"

C-2 "turn right behind the sign"

C-3 "turn left before the sign"

C-4 "turn left behind the sign"

C-5 "drive straight ahead"

C-6 "drive straight ahead or turn right"

C-7 "drive straight ahead or turn left"

C-8 "turn left or right"

C-9 "keep right"

C-10 "keep left"

C-11 "keep right or left"

C-12 "roundabout"
(or other circular movement; when used with A-7 sign vehicles driving on the roundabout have priority over vehicles approaching!)

C-13 "Zone only for bicycles"

C-13a "end of the bicycles zone"

C-14 "minimum speed"

C-15 "end of minimum speed"

C-16 "Zone only for pedestrians"

C-16a "end of pedestrians zone"

C-17 "prescribed direction of travel for vehicles with dangerous goods"

C-18 "mandatory usage of snow chains"

C-19 "end of mandatory usage of snow chains"

Combined signs C-13 and C-16 mean a way that is designated only for pedestrians and bicycles. Below are possible variants of the sign:

C-13/16 sign indicating compulsory track for pedestrians and bicycles

C-13/16 sign indicating compulsory track for pedestrians and bicycles – pedestrians on left, cyclists on right

C-13/16 sign indicating compulsory track for pedestrians and bicycles – cyclists on left, pedestrians on right

C-13/16 sign indicating end of compulsory track for pedestrians and bicycles

=== Information signs ===
Guide signs

D-1 "priority road"
(You have priority at all following crossroads until the end of the priority road.)

D-2 "end of priority road"

D-3 "one-way road"

D-4a "no through road"

D-4b "entry to no through road (right side option)"

D-4c "entry to no through road (left side option)"

D-5 "priority over oncoming vehicles"

D-6 "pedestrian crossing"

D-6 "pedestrian crossing" (with fluoro board)

D-6a "cyclist crossing"

D-6b "pedestrian crossing and cyclist crossing"

D-6b "pedestrian crossing and cyclist crossing" (with fluoro board)

D-7 "expressway"

D-8 "end of expressway"

D-9 "motorway"
(formerly used)

D-10 "end of motorway""
(formerly used)

D-11 "beginning of bus lane"

D-12 "bus lane"

D-13 "beginning of slow lane"

D-13a "beginning of lane"

D-14 "end of lane"

D-15 "bus stop"

D-16 "trolleybus stop"

D-17 "tram stop"

D-18 "parking"

D-18a "parking – reserved space"

D-18b "covered parking"

D-19 "taxi stand"
(formerly used)

D-20 "end of taxi stand"
(formerly used)

D-21 "hospital"

D-21a "police station"

D-22 "first-aid point"

D-23 "petrol station"
(formerly used)

D-23a "petrol station equipped only with gas for motor vehicles"

"petrol station with charging station for electric vehicles"

D-23c "charging station for electric vehicles"

D-24 "telephone"

D-25 "post office"

D-26 "technical service station"
(Breakdown service area)

D-26a "vulcanization"
(Tyre service area)
(formerly used)

D-26b "car wash"

D-26c "public toilet"

D-26d "shower"

D-27 "buffet or café"

D-28 "restaurant"

D-29 "hotel (motel)"

D-30 "camping site"

D-31 "camping site equipped with power sockets for camping trailers"

D-32 "bivouac site"

D-33 "youth hostel"

D-34 "tourist information point"

D-34a "radio information about road traffic"

D-34b "collective information board"

D-35 "underpass"

D-35a "escalator downwards"

D-36 "overpass footbridge"

D-36a "escalator upwards"

D-37 "tunnel"

D-38 "end of tunnel"

D-39 "permissive speeds"
(formerly used, 1993. and, 2011.)

D-39a "road tolls information"

D-40 "living street"

D-41 "end of living street"

D-42 "built-up area"

D-43 "end of built-up area"

D-44 "paid parking zone or innercity paid parking zone"
(with details – e.g. between the hours of [...] and [...])

D-45 "end of paid parking zone or innercity paid parking zone"

D-46 "non-public road"

D-47 "end of non-public road"

D-48 "change of priority"
(here: change to uncontrolled intersection)

D-48a "change of priority"
(here: change to yield)

D-49 "toll collections"

D-50 "lay by"
(to use only in vehicle breakdown or danger!)

D-51 "automatic speed control"

D-51a "automatic average speed control"

D-51b "end of automatic average speed control"

D-52 "traffic zone"
(used on non-public roads to remind that the same traffic rules as on public roads still apply)

D-53 "end of traffic zone"

D-54 "clean transport zone"

D-55 "end of clean transport zone"

D-56 "Required zipper merge during traffic jam"

=== Directional signs ===
Direction signs

E-1 "pre-signpost board"
(Advanced direction sign; diagrammatic type)

E-1a "pre-signpost board on motorway"
(Advanced direction sign; exit from motorway)

E-1b "pre-signpost board, before the motorway entrance"

E-2a "signpost board placed next to the carriageway"
(Advanced direction sign; stack type)

E-2b "signpost board placed above the carriageway"

E-2c "signpost board on the motorway, placed next to the carriageway"
(Direction sign; exit sign, stack type)

E-2d "signpost board on the motorway, placed over the carriageway"
(Direction sign; exit sign, above the lane)

E-2e "signpost board placed next to the carriageway, before the motorway entrance"
(Advanced direction sign, stack type)

E-2f "signpost board placed over the carriageway, before the motorway entrance"
(Direction sign; exit sign, above the lane, type B)

E-3 "arrow-shaped signpost to the locality, pointing a numbered road"
(Direction sign, flag type)

E-4 "arrow-shaped signpost to the locality, with the distance"
(Direction sign, flag type)

E-5 "signpost to city suburb"

E-5a "signpost to town centre"

E-6 "signpost to the airport"

E-6a "signpost to railway station"

E-6a "signpost to railway station" (alternative)

E-6b "signpost to bus station"

E-6c "signpost to car ferry terminal"

E-7 "signpost to landing or sailing"

E-8 "signpost to beach or bathing lake"

E-9 "signpost to museum"

E-10 "signpost to historic monument as a cultural asset"

E-11 "signpost to natural monument"

E-12 "signpost to viewpoint"

E-12a "signpost to a bicycle route"

E-13 "distance sign"

E-14 "distance sign of route"
(formerly used)

E-14a "distance sign of motorway route"

E-15a "national road number"

E-15b "voivodeship road number"

E-15c "motorway number"

E-15d "expressway number"

E-15e "voivodeship road number; maximum allowed vehicle axle load increased to 10 tonnes"

E-15f "national road number; maximum allowed vehicle axle load increased to 10 tonnes"

E-15g "national road number; maximum allowed vehicle axle load increased to 8 tonnes"
(formerly used)

E-16 "international route number"
(formerly used)

E-17a "locality"
(formerly used)

E-18a "end of locality"
(formerly used)

E-19 "bypass"

E-20 "motorway junction sign"
(Distance to motorway junction)

E-20 "motorway junction sign"
(Distance to motorway junction – alternative)

E-21 "suburb"

E-22a "automotive tourist route"

E-22b "object on automotive tourist route"

E-22c "information about tourist objects"

Name of motorway

=== Complementary signs ===
Complementary signs

F-1 "border crossing"
(formerly used)

F-2 "crossing the border is prohibited"
(formerly used)

F-2a "national border"

EU Country border
(not a formal road sign)

F-3 "administrative area border"
(placed on Voivodeship border)

(placed on powiat border)

(placed on gmina border)

(placed on city county border)

F-4 "name of river"

F-5 "advance warning of prohibition"
(e.g. weight)

F-6 "advance warning sign placed before the intersection"
(e.g. vehicle restriction on road to right)

F-6a "variant of advance warning sign"
(e.g. level crossing without barriers on road to the right)

F-7 "alternative way of driving in connection with the prohibition on turning left"

F-8 "detour in connection of road closure"

F-9 "leading sign on detour route"

F-10 "lane directions"

F-11 "lane directions"
(placed above the lane)

F-12 "sign leading to the transit route, placed before the intersection"
(e.g. to route for truck over 3.5 tonnes to right)

F-13 "transit route"
(e.g. for truck)

F-14a "indicator sign on the motorway, placed in a distance of 300 m before the beginning of exit lane"
(formerly used )

F-14b "indicator sign on the motorway, placed in a distance of 200 m before the beginning of exit lane"
(formerly used )

F-14c "indicator sign on the motorway, placed in a distance of 100 m before the beginning of exit lane"
(formerly used )

F-14d "indicator sign on the expressway, placed in a distance of 300 m before the beginning of exit lane"

F-14e "indicator sign on the expressway, placed in a distance of 200 m before the beginning of exit lane"

F-14f "indicator sign on the expressway, placed in a distance of 100 m before the beginning of exit lane"

F-15a "asymmetrical divide of carriageway for opposite directions"

F-16 "end of lane on bidirectional carriageway"
(traffic in centre lane must move to right)

F-17 "end of lane on one-way carriageway"
(e.g. middle lane closed)

F-18 "opposite direction for designated vehicles"
(e.g. opposite lane on the left only for emergency vehicles)

F-19 "lane for designated vehicles"
(e.g. for bicycles, on the right)

F-20 "part of road (lane) for designated vehicles"
(placed above the carriageway; here is an example for passenger cars)

F-21 "traffic redirected on adjacent carriageway"
(temporary sign, usually placed during the roadworks)

F-22 "lane restrictions"
(usually temporary sign; here is an example with let lane reduced in width)

=== Complementary plates ===
Complementary plates

T-1 "plate indicating a distance of warning sign from hazard"

T-1a "plate indicating a distance of information sign from the beginning (end) of road or lane"

T-1b "plate indicating tunnel length or road stretch to an end of the tunnel"

T-2 "plate indicating a distance on which a hazard is repeated or occurs"

T-3 "plate indicating an end of a distance on which a hazard is repeated or occurs"

T-3a "plate indicating an end of parking place"

T-4 "plate indicating a number of bends"

T-5 "plate indicating a beginning of winding road"

T-6a "plate indicating an actual course of priority road through the intersection (applied on priority road)"

T-6b "plate indicating arrangement of roads without right of way (applied on priority road)"

T-6c "plate indicating an actual course of priority road through the intersection (applied on road without right of way)"

T-6d "plate indicating perpendicular course of priority road through the intersection and an arrangement of roads without right of way (applied on road without right of way)"

T-7 "plate indicating arrangement of rail track and road on the level crossing"

T-8 "plate indicating a place, where road traffic has been redirected on tram tracks"

'T-9 "plate indicating actual amount of road incline gradient"

T-10 "plate indicating railway siding a track with a similar characteristics"

T-11 "plate indicating a ferry crossing"

T-12 "plate indicating a lengthwise fault of road surface"
(usually placed during the roadworks)

T-13 "plate indicating a road stretch that has ruts as deformations of road surface"

T-14 "plate indicating a place of frequent accidents of nature portrayed by the plate"
(here: risk of accident with pedestrian)

(variant – risk of rear-end accident with another vehicle)

(variant – risk of head-on accident with another vehicle)

(variant – risk of accident with a tram)

(variant – risk of accident with a train)

T-15 "plate indicating a place of frequent accidents caused by slippery road surface due to rain"

T-16 "plate indicating a place of privileged vehicles exit, indicated by the plate"
(e.g. fire department vehicle exit)

(variant – ambulance exit)

T-17 "plate indicating state border"

T-18 "plate indicating unexpected change of road direction"

T-18a "plate indicating unexpected change of road direction – to the right and then to the left"

T-18b "plate indicating unexpected change of road direction – to the left"

T-18c "plate indicating unexpected change of road direction – to the right"

T-19 "plate indicating road markings being painted"

T-20 "plate indicating distance of a road stretch on which restriction applies"

T-21 "plate indicating distance to a place or begin of a road stretch where restriction applies"

T-22 "plate indicating one-track bicycle exempt"

T-23a "plate indicating motorcycles"

T-23b "plate indicating trucks, special vehicles, vehicles used for special purposes, with a total mass over 3.5 tonnes, and tractor units"

T-23c "plate indicating tractors and slow-running vehicles"

T-23d "plate indicating motor vehicles towing a trailer, except of vehicles drawing a one-axled trailer or semi-trailer"

T-23e "plate indicating vehicles towing a caravan"

T-23f "plate indicating buses"

T-23g "plate indicating trolleybus"

T-23h "plate indicating vehicles carrying hazardous goods"

T-23i "plate indicating vehicles carrying explosive or easily combustable goods"

T-23j "plate indicating vehicles with goods liable to pollute water"

T-24 "plate indicating that unattended vehicle will be towed-away at the expense of the vehicle owner"

T-25a "plate indicating beginning of stopping or parking prohibition"

T-25b "plate indicating continuation of stopping or parking prohibition"

T-25c "plate indicating end of stopping or parking prohibition"

T-26 "plate indicating that stopping or parking prohibition pertains on the side of plaza"

T-27 "plate indicating a pedestrian crossing often used by children"

T-28 "plate indicating toll road"

T-28a "plate indicating end of toll road"

T-29 "plate informing of parking place designated for disabled persons"

T-30 "plate indicating parking position in relation to edge of carriageway"

(variant – perpendicular on sidewalk)

(variant – diagonal on sidewalk)

(variant – perpendicular, on carriageway and sidewalk)

(variant – diagonal, on carriageway and sidewalk)

(variant – perpendicular, only on carriageway)

(variant – diagonal, only on carriageway)

(variant – parallel, on carriageway and sidewalk)

(variant – parallel, only on carriageway)

T-31 "plate indicating tunnel category" (ADR)

T-32 "plate indicating minimum distance between vehicles"

T-33 "plate indicating fire extinguisher and emergency telephone in the lay by"

T-34 "plate indicating electronic toll payment for using a public road"

=== Additional signs ===
==== Additional signs before level crossing ====
Level crossing signs

G-1a "indicator bar with three stripes, placed on the right side of the carriageway"
(farthest)

G-1b "indicator bar with two stripes, placed on the right side of the carriageway"
(middle)

G-1c "indicator bar with one stripe, placed on the right side of the carriageway"
(closest)

G-1d "indicator bar with three stripes, placed on the left side of the carriageway"
(farthest)

G-1e "indicator bar with two stripes, placed on the left side of the carriageway"
(middle)

G-1f "indiactor bar with one stripe, placed on the left side of the carriageway"
(closest)

G-2 "electrified overhead cables"
(Do not touch the cattenary! Life hazard!)
(formerly used)

G-3 "Saint Andrew's cross before single track railroad crossing"

G-4 "Saint Andrew's cross before multitrack railroad crossing"

==== Additional signs for tram drivers ====
Tram signs

AT-1 "traffic signal"

AT-2 "tram-activated traffic signal"

AT-3 "dangerous descent"

AT-4 "Steep ascent"

AT-5 "collision-prone movement"

BT-1 "speed limit"

BT-2 "end of speed limit"

BT-3 "switch lock"

BT-4 "stop — switch operated on one side"

CT-1 "section insulator of overhead lines"

CT-2 "power supply limit for traction network section"

DT-1 "throttle activated switch left-handed" (driving in the red (left) direction requires throttle usage)

DT-2 "throttle activated switch right-handed" (driving in the red (right) direction requires throttle usage)

==== Additional signs for bicycle routes ====
Bike signs

R-1 "local bicycle route"

R-1a "beginning (end) of local bicycle route"

R-1b "change in direction of local bicycle route"

R-3 "signpost of local bicycle route"

R-4 "bicycle route information"

R-4a "information about actual course of bicycle route"

R-4b "change in direction of bicycle route"

R-4c "signpost of bicycle route"
(with distances)

R-4d "arrow-shaped directional signpost of bicycle route with distance"

R-4e "pre-signpost board of bicycle route"
(Advanced direction sign)

==== Additional signs for military vehicles drivers (unofficial) ====
Military signs

W-1 "bridge load class with one-directional traffic"

W-2 "bridge load class with bi-directional traffic"

W-3 "bridge load class of one-directional traffic for wheeled and tracked vehicles"

W-4 "bridge load class of bi-directional traffic for wheeled vehicles"

W-5 "bridge load class of bi-directional bridge for tracked vehicles"

W-6 "width of bridge or crossing point"

W-7 "height of the vertical gauge on the bridge or tunnel"

== Road markings ==
Road markings

P-1 "dashed singular line"
(overtaking allowed)

P-2 "solid singular line"
(no overtaking)

P-3 "one-sided crossing line"
(crossing line is only allowed on dashed side)

P-4 "solid doubled line"
(no overtaking line, separates two directions)

P-5 "dashed doubled line"
(usually for reversible lane markings)

P-6 "warning line"

P-7a "dashed edge line"

P-7b "solid edge line"

P-8a "lane selection arrow – straight ahead"

P-8b "lane selection arrow – turn left"

P-8c "lane selection arrow – U-turn"

P-8d "lane selection arrow – turn right"

P-9 "guiding arrow – to left"
(merge to lane on the left)

P-9b "guiding arrow – to right"
(merge to lane on the right)

P-10 "pedestrian crossing"

P-11 "cyclist crossing"

P-12 "line of absolute stopping — Stop line"

P-13 "line of conditional stopping, made of triangles"
(Yield line)

P-14 "line of conditional stopping, made of rectangles"

P-15 "triangle of yield"
(Advance warning of obligation to give way)

P-16 "stop text"
(Text confirming stop line)

P-17 "public transport stop line"

P-18 "parking space"

P-19 "parking lane"

P-20 "private parking space"
(literally envelope)

P-21 "reservation marking"

P-22 "BUS"
(Text confirming bus lane)

P-23 "bicycle"
(bicycle lane)

P-24 "parking space for disabled person"

P-25 "speed bump"

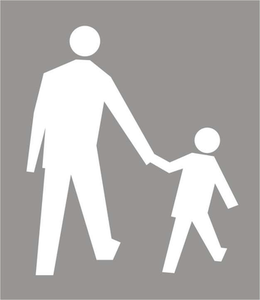
P-26 "pedestrians"

P-27 "direction and driving track of bicycle"

== Traffic signals ==
=== Traffic signals for drivers and pedestrians ===
Traffic signals for drivers and pedestrians

S-1 "traffic light with signals to direct the traffic"

S-1a "traffic light with signals for cyclists"

S-2 "traffic light with a signal permitting turning in the direction indicated by arrow"
(when displayed with red light, you have to stop before the traffic light!)

S-3a - directional traffic light with signals for driving straight ahead and turning left

S-3b - directional traffic light with signals for driving straight ahead and turning right

S-3c "directional traffic light with signals for driving straight ahead"

S-3d "directional traffic light with signals for turning right"

S-3e "directional traffic light with signals for turning left"

S-3f - directional traffic light with signals for turning left, permitting for U-turn

S-3g - directional traffic light with signals for U-turn

S-3h - directional traffic light with signals for turning left and right

S-3 - directional traffic light with signals for cyclists

S-4 "traffic light with signals for lanes"
(green arrow – you can drive on the lane, red cross – do not use the lane)

S-5 "traffic light with signals for pedestrians"
(blinking green light means a pedestrian has to leave the crossing as fast as it's possible)

S-6 "traffic light with signals for cyclists"
(blinking green light means cyclists have to leave the crossing as fast as possible)

S-7 "traffic light with a signal ordering to leave the lane"

=== Traffic signals for drivers of public transport vehicles on regular routes ===
SB "traffic light with signals for bus drivers"

ST "traffic light with signals for trams"

STK "directional traffic light with signals for trams"

STT-1 "tram signal meaning no entry past the traffic light"

STT-2 "tram signal allowing tram to go on the specific direction"
(here: to turn left)

== Traffic safety devices ==
Traffic safety devices

Road edge marker (left)

Road edge marker (right)

Marking for sharp bends, bridge parapets, abutment, walls, tunnel mouths, etc. Single arrow marker (to right)

Marking for sharp bends, bridge parapets, abutment, walls, tunnel mouths, etc. Single arrow marker (to left)

Marking for sharp bends, bridge parapets, abutment, walls, tunnel mouths, etc. Arrow marker (to right)

Marking for sharp bends, bridge parapets, abutment, walls, tunnel mouths, etc. Arrow marker (to left)

Marker for exits

Marker for barriers, reservations, etc.

== Historic signs ==
=== 1929 road signs ===
Uneven road

Series of bends

Crossroad

Level crossing with barriers

Level crossing without barriers

Danger

No vehicles

No entry

No motor vehicles except motorcycles

No trucks

No horse-drawn carts

Weight limit

Speed limit

No stopping

No parking

Mandatory direction

Customs

Parking

Caution

First aid

=== 1938 road signs ===
Uneven road

Series of bends

Crossroad

Level crossing with barriers

Level crossing without barriers

Danger

Yield

No vehicles

No entry

No motor vehicles except motorcycles

No trucks

No horse-drawn carts

Weight limit

Speed limit

No overtaking

No honking

No stopping

No parking

One way street (No U-turns)

Mandatory direction

Customs

Bicycle path

Parking

Caution

First aid

Border crossing

=== 1956 road signs ===
==== Warning signs ====
Uneven road

Right curve

Left curve

Double right curve

Double left curve

Dangerous bends

Crossroad

Level crossing with gates

Level crossing without gates

Countdown marker

Countdown marker

Countdown marker

Countdown marker

Crossbuck (one track)

Crossbuck (two or more tracks)

Steep descent

Road narrows

Draw bridge

Roadworks

Pedestrian crossing

Children

Animals

Other danger

Give way

==== Prohibitory signs ====
No vehicles

No entry

No left turn

No right turn

No overtaking

No motor vehicles except motorcycles

No trucks

No animal-drawn carts

No bicycles

Width limit

Height limit

Weight limit

Speed limit

End of speed limit

Stop

Customs

No honking

No parking

No stopping

==== Indicative signs ====
Mandatory direction (turn left)

Mandatory direction (turn right)

Mandatory direction (Proceed straight)

Bicycle path

One way street (No U-turns)

Parking

First aid or hospital

=== 1962 road signs ===
==== Warning signs ====
Uneven road

Right curve

Left curve

Double right curve

Double left curve

Crossroad

Level crossing with gates

Level crossing without gates

Countdown marker

Countdown marker

Countdown marker

Countdown marker

Crossbuck (one track)

Crossbuck (two or more tracks)

Steep descent

Road narrows

Draw bridge

Roadworks

Slippery road

Pedestrian crossing

Children

Domesticated animals

Wild animals

Crossroad with priority

Two-way traffic

Tram crossing

Low-flying planes

Other danger

Give way

==== Prohibitory signs ====
No vehicles

No entry

No left turn

No right turn

No overtaking

No overtaking ends

No overtaking for trucks

No overtaking for trucks ends

No motor vehicles except motorcycles

No motorcycles

No motor vehicles

No trucks

No agricultural vehicles

No animal-drawn carts

No bicycles

Width limit

Height limit

Weight limit

Axle weight limit

Speed limit

Speed limit ends

Stop

Customs

No parking

No stopping

Give way to oncoming traffic

No honking

No honking ends

==== Mandatory signs ====
Mandatory direction (turn left)

Mandatory direction (turn right)

Mandatory direction (Proceed straight)

Keep right

Keep left

Roundabout

Bicycle path

==== Information signs ====
Parking

Hospital

First aid

Repair service

Public telephone

Filling station

Camping

Dead end

Priority over oncoming traffic

Priority road

Priority road ends

=== 1968 road signs ===
==== Warning signs ====
Rough road

Curve to the right

Curve to the left

Double curve, or a series of curves, the first to the right

Double curve, or a series of curves, the first to the left

Intersection

Railroad crossing with gates

Railroad crossing without gates

Crossbuck (one track)

Crossbuck (two or more tracks)

Railroad crossing countdown marker

Railroad crossing countdown marker

Railroad crossing countdown marker

Steep descent

Road narrows

Road narrows (left)

Road narrows (right)

Draw bridge

Roadworks

Slippery road

Pedestrian crossing

Children

Animals (domesticated)

Animals (wild)

Intersection with priority

Two-way traffic

Tram crossing

Low-flying aircraft

Steep ascent

Bicycle crossing

Rockfall

Roundabout ahead

Riverbank

Loose gravel

Traffic lights ahead

Other danger

Yield

==== Prohibitory signs ====
No vehicles

Do not enter

No left turn

No right turn

No overtaking

End of the overtaking prohibition

No overtaking by goods vehicles

End of the overtaking prohibition for goods vehicles

No motor vehicles except motorcycles

No motorcycles

No motor vehicles

No trucks

No tractors

No vehicles with trailer

No animal-drawn vehicles

No bicycles

Width limit

Height limit

Weight limit

Weight limit per axle

Speed limit

End of the speed limit

Stop

Customs

No parking

No stopping

No U-turn

Length limit

Yield to oncoming traffic

No beeping

==== Mandatory signs ====
Mandatory direction (Turn right)

Mandatory direction (Turn right ahead)

Mandatory direction (Turn left)

Mandatory direction (Turn left ahead)

Mandatory direction (Proceed straight)

Keep right

Keep left

Roundabout

Bicycle path

==== Information signs ====
Parking

Hospital

First aid station

Breakdown service

Telephone

Gas station

Camping

Dead end

Priority over oncoming traffic

One-way traffic

Pedestrian crossing

Motorway

End of motorway

Priority road

End of priority road

Refreshment

Restaurant

Hotel or motel

Youth hostel
