= Paszkowszczyzna, Bielsk County =

Paszkowszczyzna
- Village
- Location within Poland
- Coordinates: 52°41′N 23°16′E
- Country: Poland
- Voivodeship: Podlaskie
- County: Bielsk
- Gmina: Orla
- Population: 150

Paszkowszczyzna [paʂkɔfʂˈt͡ʂɨzna] is a village in the administrative district of Gmina Orla, within Bielsk County, Podlaskie Voivodeship, in north-eastern Poland.

According to the 1921 census, the village was inhabited by 129 people, among whom 113 Orthodox, and 16 Mosaic. At the same time, 113 inhabitants declared Belarusian nationality, 16 Jewish . There were 48 residential buildings in the village.

It is in one of five Polish/Belarusian bilingual Gmina in Podlaskie Voivodeship regulated by the Act of 6 January 2005 on National and Ethnic Minorities and on the Regional Languages, which permits certain gminas with significant linguistic minorities to introduce a second, auxiliary language to be used in official contexts alongside Polish.
