= Orla, Podlaskie Voivodeship =

Orla
- Village
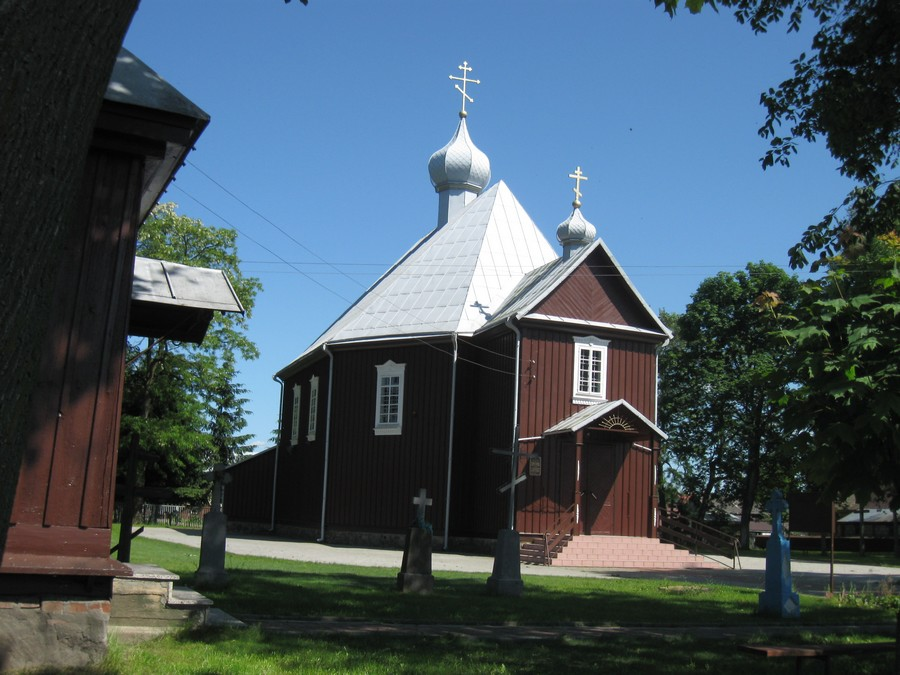
- Church of Saint Michael Archangel

- Coat of arms

- Location within Poland
- Coordinates: 52°42′26″N 23°19′48″E
- Country: Poland
- Voivodeship: Podlaskie
- County: Bielsk
- Gmina: Orla

Population
  - Total: 1,100
- Time zone: UTC+1 (CET)
  - Summer (DST): UTC+2 (CEST)

Orla [ˈɔrla] is a village in Bielsk County, Podlaskie Voivodeship, in north-eastern Poland. It is the seat of the gmina (administrative district) called Gmina Orla.

== History ==
It was a private town, administratively located in the Bielsk County in the Podlaskie Voivodeship in the Lesser Poland Province of the Kingdom of Poland.

According to the 1921 census, the village was inhabited by 1.518 people, among whom 31 were Roman Catholic, 320 Orthodox, and 1.167 Jewish. At the same time, 400 inhabitants declared Polish nationality, 145 Belarusian and 1.167 Jewish. There were 253 residential buildings in the village.

Following the German-Soviet invasion of Poland, which started World War II in September 1939, the town was occupied by the Soviet Union until 1941, and then by Nazi Germany until 1944.

== Demographics ==
The village is in one of five Polish/Belarusian bilingual Gmina in Podlaskie Voivodeship regulated by the Act of 6 January 2005 on National and Ethnic Minorities and on the Regional Languages, which permits certain gminas with significant linguistic minorities to introduce a second, auxiliary language to be used in official contexts alongside Polish.
