= Novohryhorivka =

Novohryhorivka (Ukrainian: Новогригорівка) may refer to several places in Ukraine:

== Donetsk Oblast ==
- Novohryhorivka, Horlivka Raion, village in Horlivka Raion
- Novohryhorivka, Kramatorsk Raion, Donetsk Oblast, an urban-type settlement in Kramatorsk Raion
- Novohryhorivka, Mariupol Raion, Donetsk Oblast, village in Mariupol Raion
- Novohryhorivka, Myrne settlement hromada, Volnovakha Raion, Donetsk Oblast, village in Volnovakha Raion
- Novohryhorivka, Volnovakha urban hromada, Volnovakha Raion, Donetsk Oblast, village in Volnovakha Raion

== Luhansk Oblast ==
- Novohryhorivka, Alchevsk Raion, Luhansk Oblast, village in Alchevsk Raion
