= Oleksze =

- Village
- Location within Poland
- Coordinates: 52°40′7″N 23°12′36″E
- Country: Poland
- Voivodeship: Podlaskie
- County: Bielsk
- Gmina: Orla

Oleksze [ɔˈlɛkʂɛ] (Belarusian: Олекшы) is a village in the administrative district of Gmina Orla, within Bielsk County, Podlaskie Voivodeship, in northeastern Poland.

It is in one of five Polish/Belarusian bilingual Gmina in Podlaskie Voivodeship regulated by the Act of 6 January 2005 on National and Ethnic Minorities and on the Regional Languages, which permits certain gminas with significant linguistic minorities to introduce a second, auxiliary language to be used in official contexts alongside Polish.
