= Gregorowce =

- Village
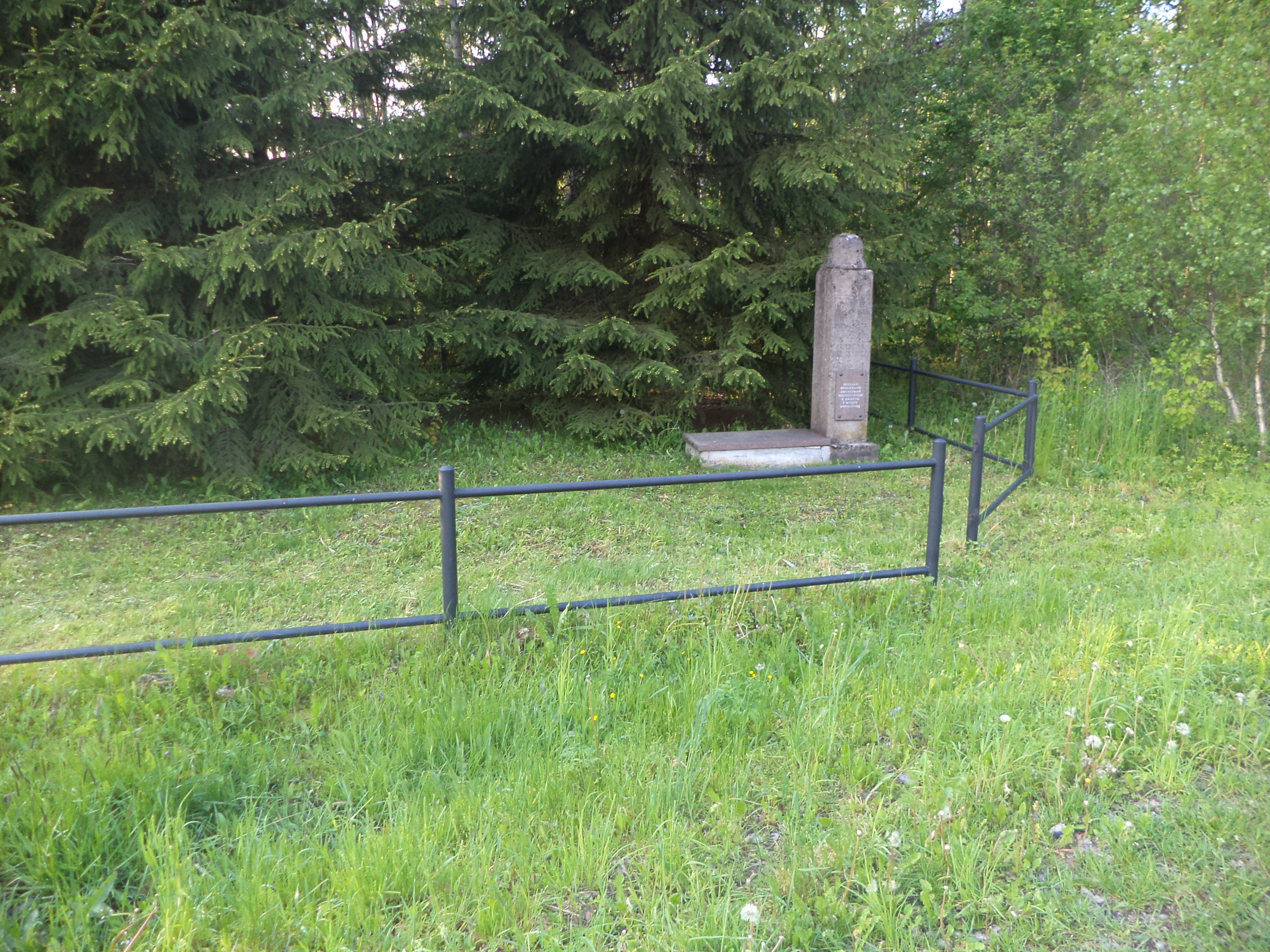

- Location within Poland
- Coordinates: 52°39′N 23°15′E
- Country: Poland
- Voivodeship: Podlaskie
- County: Bielsk
- Gmina: Orla

Population (approx.)
  - Total: 200
- Time zone: UTC+1 (CET)
  - Summer (DST): UTC+2 (CEST)

Gregorowce [ɡrɛɡɔˈrɔft͡sɛ] is a village in the administrative district of Gmina Orla, within Bielsk County, Podlaskie Voivodeship, in north-eastern Poland.

It is in one of five Polish/Belarusian bilingual Gmina in Podlaskie Voivodeship regulated by the Act of 6 January 2005 on National and Ethnic Minorities and on the Regional Languages, which permits certain gminas with significant linguistic minorities to introduce a second, auxiliary language to be used in official contexts alongside Polish.

== History ==
According to the 1921 census, the village was inhabited by 175 people, among whom 170 Orthodox, and 5 Jewish. At the same time, 23 inhabitants declared Polish nationality, 152 Belarusian. There were 40 residential buildings in the village.

Five Polish citizens were murdered by Nazi Germany in the village during World War II.
