= Szczyty-Nowodwory =

- Village
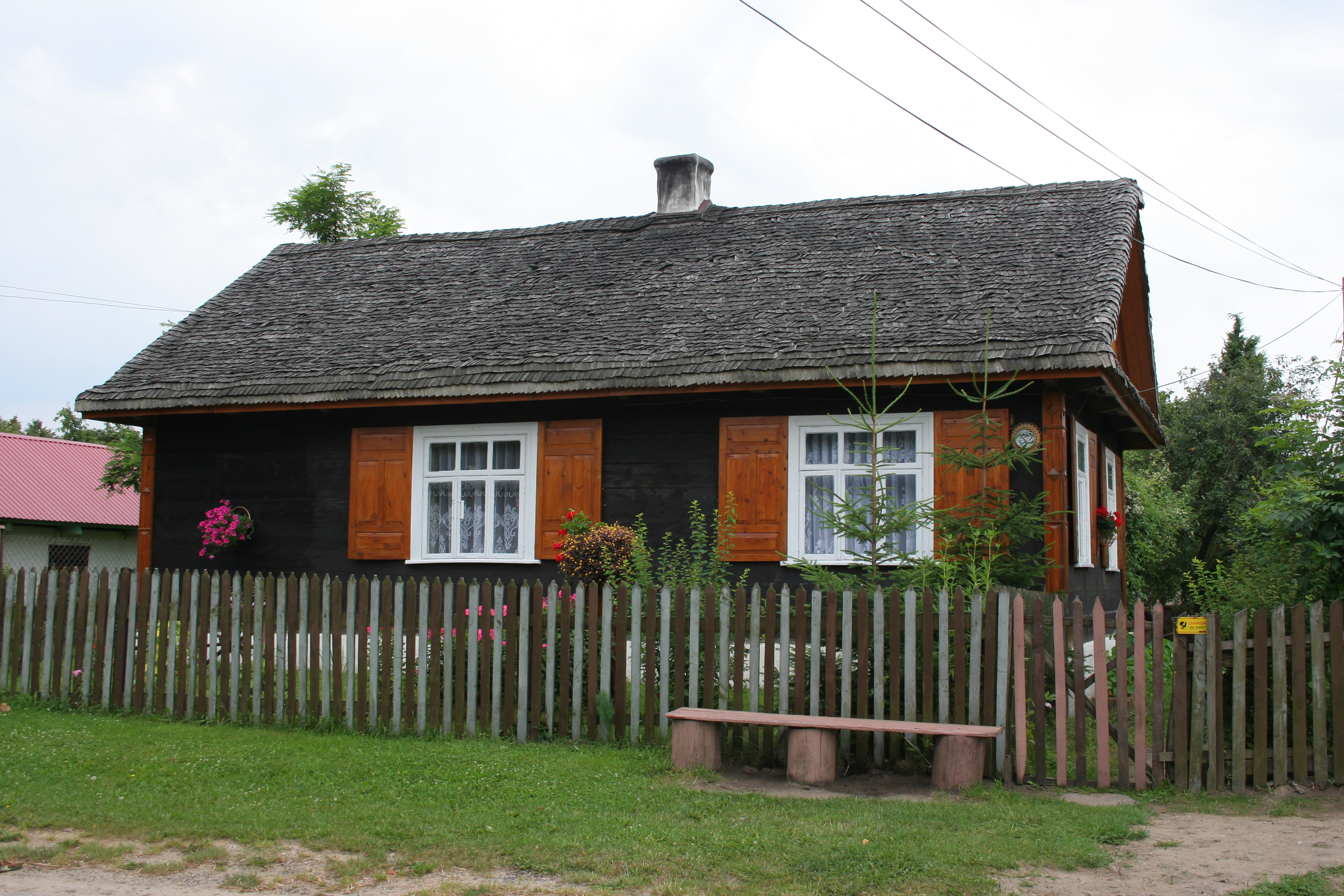

- Location within Poland
- Coordinates: 52°44′13″N 23°21′20″E
- Country: Poland
- Voivodeship: Podlaskie
- County: Bielsk
- Gmina: Orla

Szczyty-Nowodwory [ˈʂt͡ʂɨtɨ nɔvɔdˈvɔrɨ] is a village in the administrative district of Gmina Orla, within Bielsk County, Podlaskie Voivodeship, in north-eastern Poland.

According to the 1921 census, the village was inhabited by 323 people, among whom 23 were Roman Catholic, 290 Orthodox, and 10 Mosaic. At the same time, 43 inhabitants declared Polish nationality, 280 Belarusian. There were 67 residential buildings in the village.

It is in one of five Polish/Belarusian bilingual Gmina in Podlaskie Voivodeship regulated by the Act of 6 January 2005 on National and Ethnic Minorities and on the Regional Languages, which permits certain gminas with significant linguistic minorities to introduce a second, auxiliary language to be used in official contexts alongside Polish.
