= Grigoryevka =

Grigoryevka Григорьевка
- Selo
- Location within Amur Oblast Location within Russia
- Coordinates: 50°31′N 128°47′E
- Country: Russia
- Region: Amur Oblast
- District: Romnensky District
- Time zone: UTC+9:00

Grigoryevka (Russian: Григорьевка) is a rural locality (a selo) in Dalnevostochny Selsoviet of Romnensky District, Amur Oblast, Russia. The population was 77 as of 2018. There are 2 streets.

== Geography ==
Grigoryevka is located 53 km southwest of Romny (the district's administrative centre) by road. Vysokoye and Dalnevostochnoye are the nearest rural localities.
