= Gmina Orla =

Gmina Orla Orla Commune
- Gmina
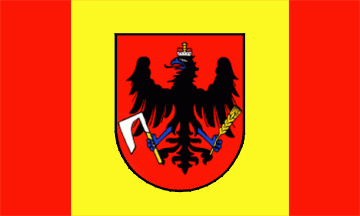
- Flag Coat of arms

- Location within Podlaskie Voivodeship Location within Poland
- Coordinates (Orla): 52°42′26″N 23°19′48″E
- Country: Poland
- Voivodeship: Podlaskie
- County: Bielsk
- Seat: Orla

Government
  - Mayor: Piotr Selwesiuk

Area
  - Total: 159.68 km^{2} (61.65 sq mi)

Population (2007)
  - Total: 3,256
  - Density: 20.39/km^{2} (52.81/sq mi)
- Time zone: UTC+1 (CET)
  - Summer (DST): UTC+2 (CEST)
- Postal code: 17-106
- Area code: +48 085
- Car plates: BBI
- Website: http://www.orla.pl

Gmina Orla [ˈɔrla] (Belarusian: Гміна Орля) is a rural gmina (Polish: gmina wiejska) in Bielsk County, Podlaskie Voivodeship. It is located in north-eastern Poland.

It is one of five Polish/Belarusian bilingual Gmina in Podlaskie Voivodeship regulated by the Act of 6 January 2005 on National and Ethnic Minorities and on the Regional Languages, which permits certain gminas with significant linguistic minorities to introduce a second, auxiliary language to be used in official contexts alongside Polish.

== Geography ==
Gmina Orla is located in the geographical region of Europe known as the Wysoczyzny Podlasko–Białoruskie (English: Podlaskie and Belarus Plateau) and the mezoregion known as the Równina Bielska (English: Bielska Plain).

The Orlanka River, a tributary of the Narew River, passes through Gmina Orla.

The Gmina covers an area of 159.68 square kilometres (61.7 sq mi).

=== Location ===
It is located approximately:

- 165 kilometres (102.5 mi) northeast of Warsaw, the capital of Poland
- 47 kilometres (29.2 mi) south of Białystok, the capital of the Podlaskie Voivodeship
- 11 kilometres (6.8 mi) southeast of Bielsk Podlaski, the seat of Bielsk County

=== Climate ===
The region has a continental climate which is characterized by high temperatures during summer and long and frosty winters. The average amount of rainfall during the year exceeds 550 millimetres (21.7 in).

== Demographics ==
Detailed data as of 31 December 2007:

	Total		Women		Men	
Unit	Number	%	Number	%	Number	%
Population	3,256	100	1,700	52.2	1,556	47.8
Population Density (persons/km^{2})	20.4		10.6		9.7	

== Municipal government ==
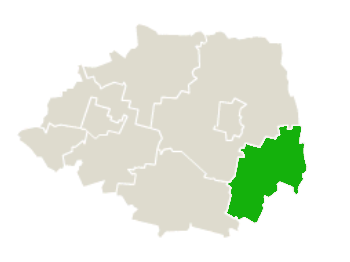
Gmina Orla in Bielsk County

Its seat is the village of Orla.

=== Executive branch ===
The chief executive of the government is the Mayor (Polish: Wójt).

=== Legislative branch ===
The legislative portion of the government is the City Council (Polish: Rada) comprising the President (Polish: Przewodniczący), the Vice-President (Polish: Wiceprzewodniczący) and thirteen councilors.

=== Villages ===
The following villages are contained within the gmina:

Czechy Zabłotne, Dydule, Gredele, Gregorowce, Koszele, Koszki, Krywiatycze, Malinniki, Malinniki-Kolonia, Mikłasze, Antonowo-Kolonia, Moskiewce, Oleksze, Orla, Paszkowszczyzna, Pawlinowo, Reduty, Spiczki, Szczyty-Dzięciołowo, Szczyty-Nowodwory, Szernie, Topczykały, Wólka, Wólka Wygonowska

=== Neighbouring political subdivisions ===
Gmina Orla is bordered by the gminas of Bielsk Podlaski, Boćki, Czyże, Dubicze Cerkiewne and Kleszczele
