= Poprad River Gorge =

Coordinates: 49.3000°N 20.923°E

Poprad River Gorge

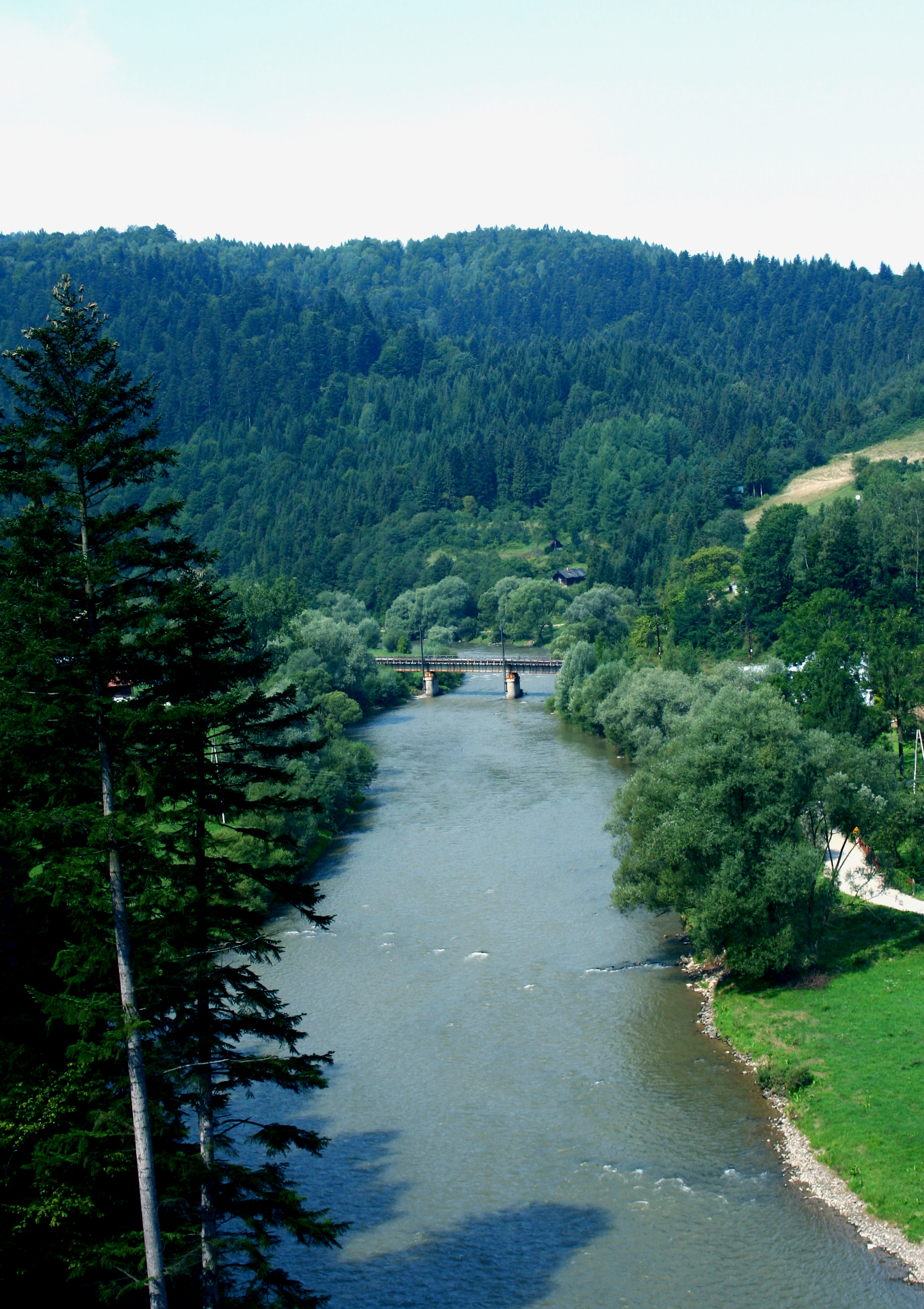
Poprad River Gorge near Leluchów-Čirč

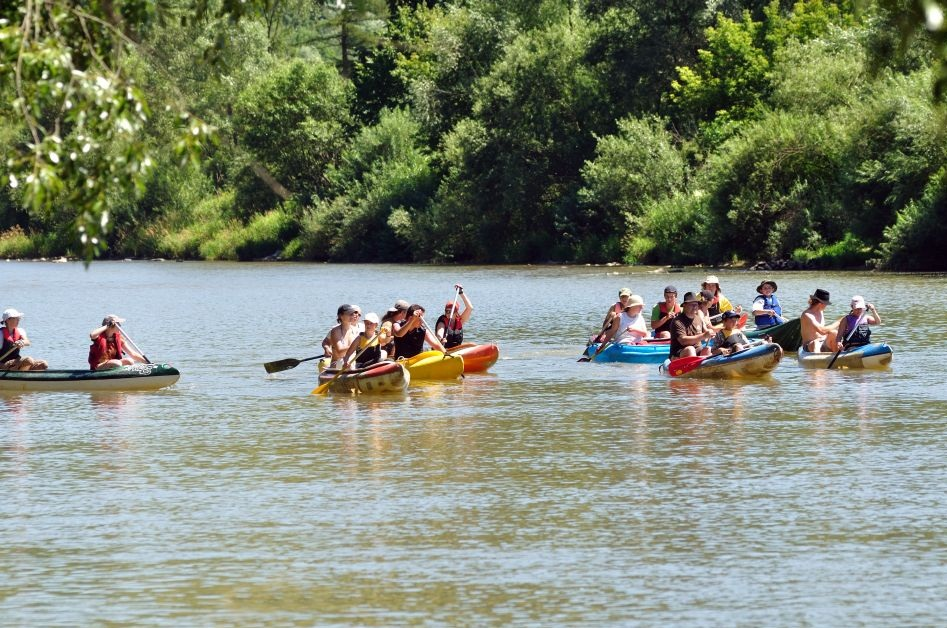
Poprad river rafting near Muszyna

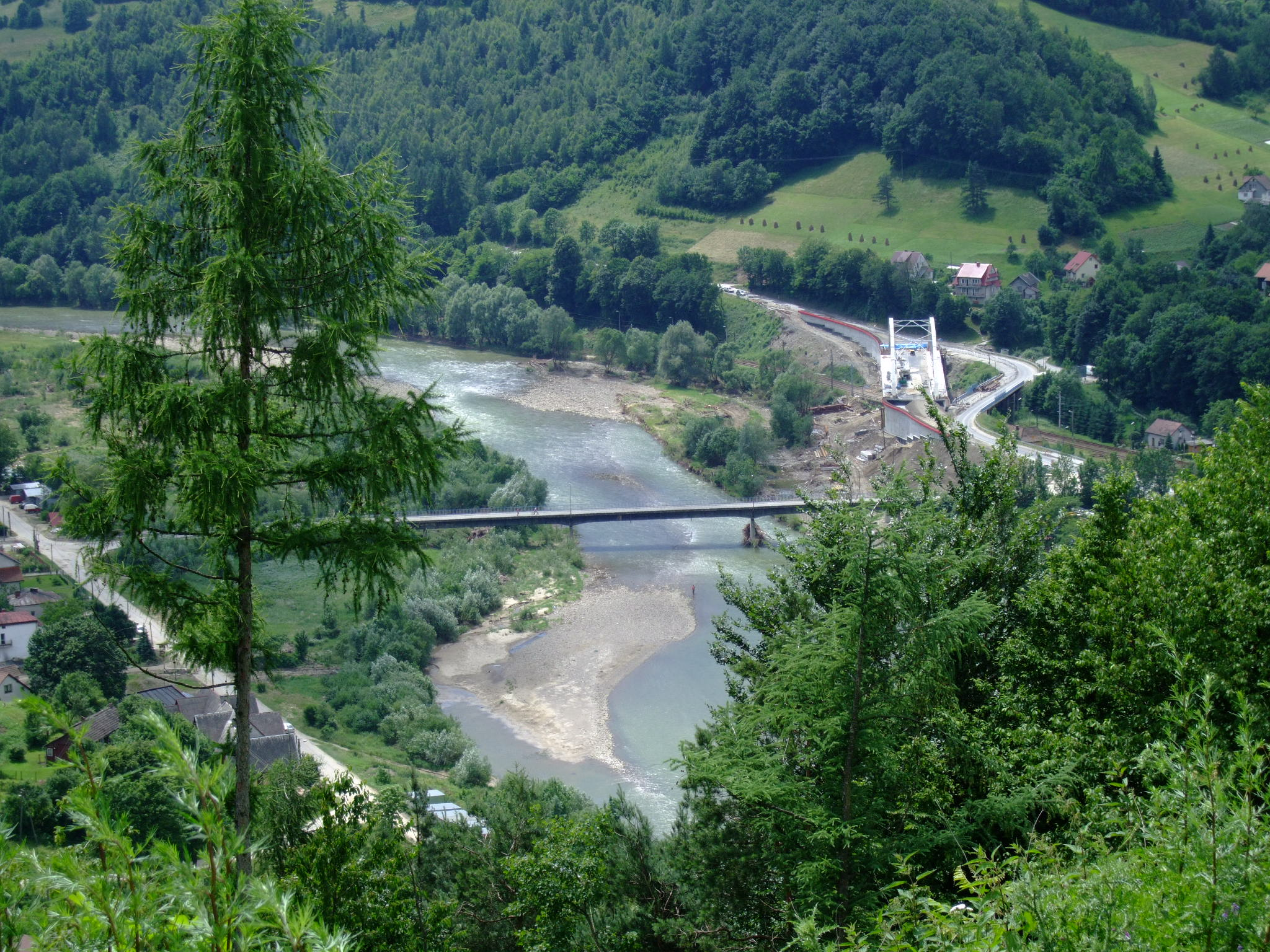
Road junction outside Rytro with bridge over Poprad (centre) and viaduct over the historic Austro-Hungarian railway line (right)

The Poprad River Gorge (Polish: Przełom Popradu) runs through the Western Carpathian Mountain Range in the southernmost part of Poland. It is formed by the river Poprad, the only large river flowing north from Slovakia into Poland, the tributary of Dunajec near Stary Sącz, in Lesser Poland Voivodeship. The Gorge is located within the Poprad Landscape Park which is the biggest protected area in the country. It marks the frontier between Poland and Slovakia in the area.

== Geography ==
The Poprad forms several dramatic meanders between the towns of Piwniczna and Muszyna. The river also forms picturesque gorges in its upper and middle run, of which the most prominent is the one between Piwniczna and Rytro, usually referred to as the Gorge, dividing Beskid Sądecki into two separate mountain chains called Pasmo Radziejowej and Pasmo Jaworzyny.

The river, along with other regional attractions such as the mineral springs, is a magnet for qualified tourism and water sports in the area. The mineral springs discovered already in the 19th century stimulated the development of resort towns along the course of the Poprad, such as Krynica, Żegiestów, Lomnica, as well as Muszyna and Piwniczna where the popular river rafting trips are organized. The surrounding Low Beskids (part of Western Carpathian mountain range) are also a popular winter-sports destination, with trans-Carpathian railway connecting Nowy Sącz in Poland, with Košice (Koszyce) in Slovakia.

== Railway line ==
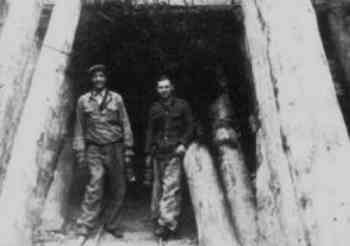
Polish miners Mr. Gacek and Mr. Cechini during construction of the fateful tunnel along the Poprad River Gorge, 1874

During the Austro-Hungarian Empire when the region was part of the Austrian Partition of Poland, there was a railway line built by the authorities along the valley of the Poprad, between 1874 and 1876. It was a major undertaking, because the installation of tracks was severely limited by the river on the one side, and steep mountain slopes on the other. The engineering firm Koller und Gregorsen from Vienna won the bid for the construction of the entire line Tarnów-Leluchów-Orlov including the tunnel Żegiestów-Andrzejówka. The tunnel, some 511 metres (559 yards) in length, collapsed, causing a major human catastrophe. Over 120 Polish railway workers from nearby settlements were killed in the rubble. Rescue attempts proved impossible and the place was left undisturbed as a mass grave. As a result of the accident, the idea of running a double track was abandoned as a whole. A much narrower tunnel was dug out around the site of the miners' entombment, allowing for a single track which was continued along the entire stretch of the railway line.

In the interwar period of the sovereign Poland the railway line along Poprad was refurbished and improved to provide the connection with the rapidly expanding resort towns in the Beskids, including Muszyna and, most of all, Krynica-Zdrój, the biggest spa town in Poland called the Pearl of Polish Spas.

== See also ==
- Dunajec River Gorge
