= List of spa towns in Poland =

The following is a partial list of spa towns in Poland.

Image	Town or village	Voivodeship	Coordinates	Notes	Refs
	Augustów	Podlaskie	53°51′N 22°58′E	therapeutic mud; mineral water	
	Busko-Zdrój	Świętokrzyskie	50°28′N 20°43′E		
	Ciechocinek	Kuyavian-Pomeranian	52°52′0″N 18°48′0″E	one of the main Polish resorts; curative brines flowing from natural springs (temp. 10-13 °C); two wells (depths 1300m and 1380m, temp. 29-37 °C); several wells with cold water; 19 sanatoriums, 8 spa hospitals; graduation towers and spa parks complex listed as a Historic Monument of Poland	
	Cieplice Śląskie-Zdrój (a former town, now a district of Jelenia Góra)	Lower Silesian	50°54′12″N 15°44′4″E	warmest curative waters in Poland	
	Czerniawa-Zdrój (a former village, now a district of Świeradów-Zdrój)	Lower Silesian	50°54′N 15°18′E		
	Dąbki	West Pomeranian	54°22′52″N 16°18′59″E		
	Długopole-Zdrój	Lower Silesian	50°14′52″N 16°37′52″E		
	Duszniki-Zdrój	Lower Silesian	50°24′N 16°23′E	several shallow wells (up to 160m of depth, temp. 17-18 °C); one spring - Pieniawa Chopina	
	Gołdap	Warmian-Masurian	54°18′58″N 22°18′34″E		
	Goczałkowice-Zdrój	Silesian	49°56′N 18°58′E		
	Horyniec-Zdrój	Subcarpathian	50°11′26″N 23°21′43″E		
	Inowrocław	Kuyavian-Pomeranian	52°48′N 18°16′E		
	Iwonicz-Zdrój	Subcarpathian	49°34′24″N 21°47′37″E	geothermal waters (temp. 20 °C) produced by several abandoned oil wells (up to 1000m of depth)	
	Jastrzębie-Zdrój	Silesian	49°57′N 18°35′E		
	Jedlina-Zdrój	Lower Silesian	50°43′N 16°20′E		
	Kamień Pomorski	West Pomeranian	53°58′N 14°46′E		
	Kołobrzeg	West Pomeranian	54°11′N 15°35′E		
	Konstancin-Jeziorna	Masovian	52°05′N 21°07′E		
	Krasnobród	Lublin	50°32′41″N 23°13′5″E		
	Krynica-Zdrój	Lesser Poland	49°26′N 20°58′E		
	Kudowa-Zdrój	Lower Silesian	50°26′N 16°14′E		
	Lądek-Zdrój	Lower Silesian	50°20′37″N 16°52′47″E	several springs (temp. 20-30 °C); 2 wells (700m deep, temp. 46 °C)	
	Międzyzdroje	West Pomeranian	53°56′N 14°27′E		
	Muszyna	Lesser Poland	49°21′30″N 20°54′00″E		
	Nałęczów	Lublin	51°17′10″N 22°13′00″E		
	Piwniczna-Zdrój	Lesser Poland	49°26′7″N 20°42′41″E		
	Polanica-Zdrój	Lower Silesian	50°24′N 16°31′E		
	Polańczyk	Subcarpathian	49°22′10″N 22°25′11″E		
	Połczyn-Zdrój	West Pomeranian	53°46′N 16°06′E		
	Przerzeczyn-Zdrój	Lower Silesian	50°41′N 16°49′E		
	Rabka-Zdrój	Lesser Poland	49°36′30″N 19°58′0″E		
	Rymanów-Zdrój	Subcarpathian	49°33′N 21°51′E		
	Solec-Zdrój	Świętokrzyskie	50°21′59″N 20°53′13″E		
	Solina	Subcarpathian	49°23′N 22°28′E		
	Sopot	Pomeranian	54°27′N 18°34′E		
	Supraśl	Podlaskie	53°12′40″N 23°20′15″E		
	Szczawnica	Lesser Poland	49°25′30″N 20°29′00″E		
	Szczawno-Zdrój	Lower Silesian	50°47′58″N 16°15′18″E		
	Świeradów-Zdrój	Lower Silesian	50°54′N 15°20′E		
	Świnoujście	West Pomeranian	53°55′N 14°15′E		
	Uniejów	Łódź	51°58′12″N 18°48′1″E		
	Ustka	Pomeranian	54°35′N 16°51′E		
	Ustroń	Silesian	49°43′9.82″N 18°48′43″E		
	Wapienne	Lesser Poland	49°37′31″N 21°17′11″E		
	Wieliczka	Lesser Poland	49°59′N 20°04′E		
	Wieniec-Zdrój	Kuyavian-Pomeranian	52°39′24″N 18°59′18″E		
	Wysowa-Zdrój	Lesser Poland	49°26′N 21°11′E		
	Zakopane	Lesser Poland	49°18′N 19°58′E		
	Żegiestów	Lesser Poland	49°23′N 20°48′E		

== See also ==
- List of spa towns
- Tourism in Poland
