= Lopata (disambiguation) =

Lopata is a settlement in Celje, eastern Slovenia. Lopata may also refer to:

- Lopata, Žužemberk, Slovenia
- Łopata, Świętokrzyskie Voivodeship, Poland
- Łopata Polska, Poland
- Lopata (surname)
- Lopata, islet (sea stack) with the Lopata lighthouse, located of the shore of Klek peninsula, Neum, Bosnia and Herzegovina
