= Milik (disambiguation) =

Milik is a village in southern Poland.

Milik may also refer to:

- Arkadiusz Milik (born 1994), Polish footballer
- Józef Milik (1922–2006), Polish biblical scholar and Catholic priest
- Václav Milík Sr. (born 1960), Czech speedway rider
- Václav Milík Jr. (born 1993), Czech speedway rider
