= Poprad (river) =

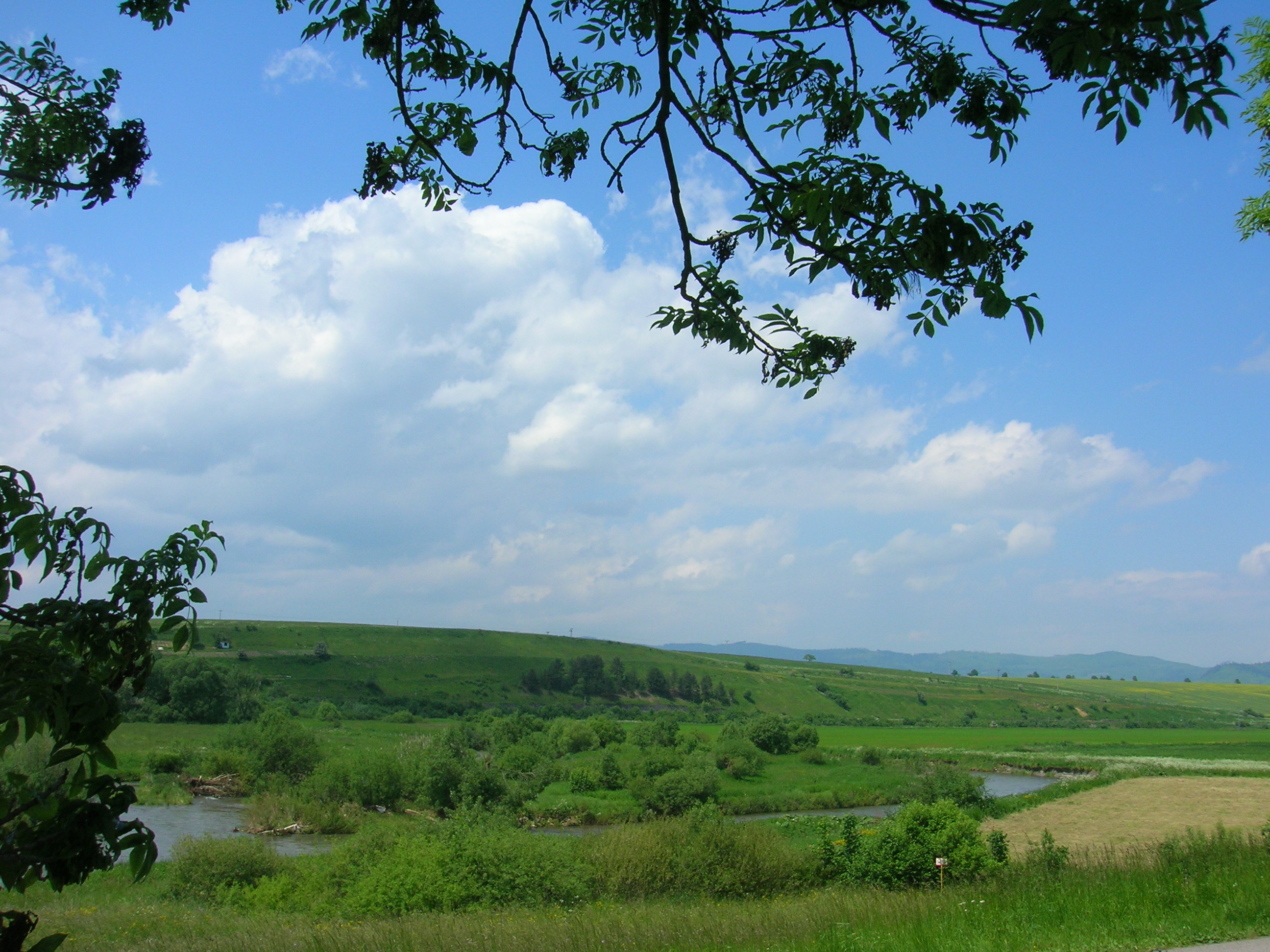
- The Poprad near Spišská Belá in Kežmarok district

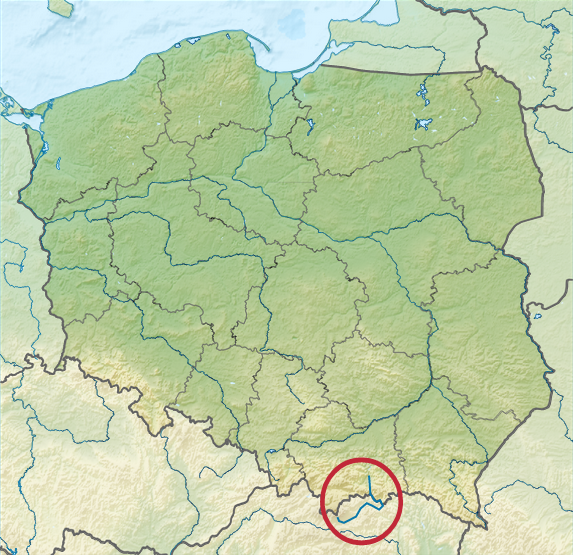

Location
- Countries: Slovakia; Poland

Physical characteristics
- Source
  - location: High Tatras
  - coordinates: 49.1355°N 20.0765°E
  - elevation: 1,302.3 m (4,273 ft)
- Mouth: Dunajec
  - coordinates: 49.5888°N 20.6502°E
  - elevation: 292 m (958 ft)
- Length: 174.2 km (108.2 mi)
- Basin size: 2,081 km^{2} (803 sq mi)
- Discharge
  - average: 22.3 m^{3}/s (790 cu ft/s)

Basin features
- Progression: Dunajec→ Vistula→ Baltic Sea

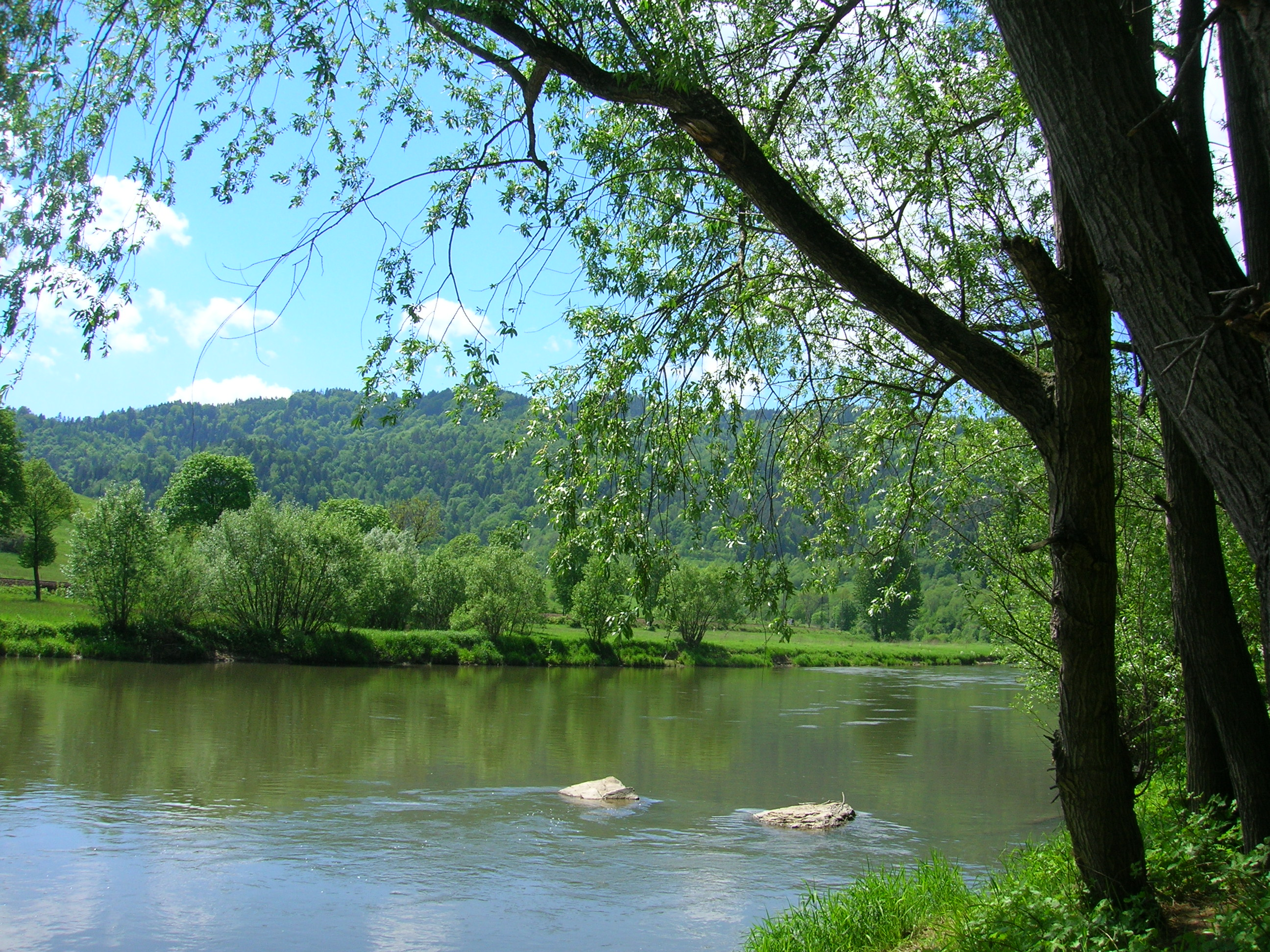
The Poprad forming the Polish-Slovak border

The Poprad (Hungarian: Poprád, German: Popper) is a river in northern Slovakia and southern Poland, and a tributary of the Dunajec River near Stary Sącz, Poland. It has a length of 170 kilometres (63 km of which are within the Polish borders) and a basin area of 2,077 km^{2}, (1,594 km^{2} of which is in Slovakia, and 483 km^{2} in Poland). Much of the Polish part of its basin is included in the protected area called Poprad Landscape Park featuring the Poprad River Gorge, a popular tourist destination between the towns of Piwniczna and Rytro.

Poprad is the only large Slovak river flowing north into southern Poland. The river flows through the Slovak towns of Poprad, Kežmarok, Stará Ľubovňa, then forms for 31.1 km the Polish-Slovak border and flows through the Polish towns of Krynica-Zdrój, Muszyna, Piwniczna-Zdrój, Rytro, Stary Sącz, and Żegiestów, among others.

== Etymology ==
The name is derived from a Proto-Slavic verb pręd- (to flow fast, to jump), preserved in the Slovak words priasť, pradenie (to spin, spinning).

== See also ==
- Rivers of Poland
- Rivers of Slovakia
- Poprad (town), Slovakia

== Bibliography ==
- Ondruš, Šimon (1991). "Ešte raz o pôvode tatranskej rieky Poprad" (PDF). Slovenská reč (4). Bratislava: Veda, Vydavateľstvo Slovenskej akadémie vied.
- Zofia Radwańska-Paryska, Witold Henryk Paryski; Wielka encyklopedia tatrzańska. Poronin: Wydawnictwo Górskie, 2004. ISBN 83-7104-009-1.
- Beskid Sądecki. Mapa 1:50 000. Piwniczna: Agencja Wyd. „Wit”. ISBN 83-915737-3-7.
- Jerzy Kondracki, Geografia regionalna Polski. Warszawa: Wyd. Naukowe PWN, 1998. ISBN 83-01-12479-2.
