= Gmina Muszyna =

Gmina Muszyna Muszyna Commune
- Gmina
- Flag Coat of arms
- Interactive map of Gmina Muszyna
- Coordinates (Muszyna): 49°21′30″N 20°54′0″E
- Country: Poland
- Voivodeship: Lesser Poland
- County: Nowy Sącz County
- Seat: Muszyna

Area
  - Total: 141.99 km^{2} (54.82 sq mi)

Population (2006)
  - Total: 11,293
  - Density: 79.534/km^{2} (205.99/sq mi)
  - Urban: 4,980
  - Rural: 6,313
- Website: http://www.muszyna.iap.pl

Gmina Muszyna is an urban-rural gmina (administrative district) in Nowy Sącz County, Lesser Poland Voivodeship, in southern Poland, on the Slovak border. Its seat is the town of Muszyna, which lies approximately 33 kilometres (21 mi) south-east of Nowy Sącz and 105 km (65 mi) south-east of the regional capital Kraków.

The gmina covers an area of 141.99 square kilometres (54.8 sq mi), and as of 2006 its total population is 11,293 (out of which the population of Muszyna amounts to 4,980, and the population of the rural part of the gmina is 6,313).

== Villages ==
Apart from the town of Muszyna, Gmina Muszyna contains the villages and settlements of Andrzejówka, Dubne, Jastrzębik, Leluchów, Łopata Polska, Milik, Powroźnik, Szczawnik, Wojkowa, Żegiestów and Złockie.

== Neighbouring gminas ==
Gmina Muszyna is bordered by the gminas of Krynica-Zdrój, Łabowa and Piwniczna-Zdrój. It also borders Slovakia.
