= Dubne =

- Village
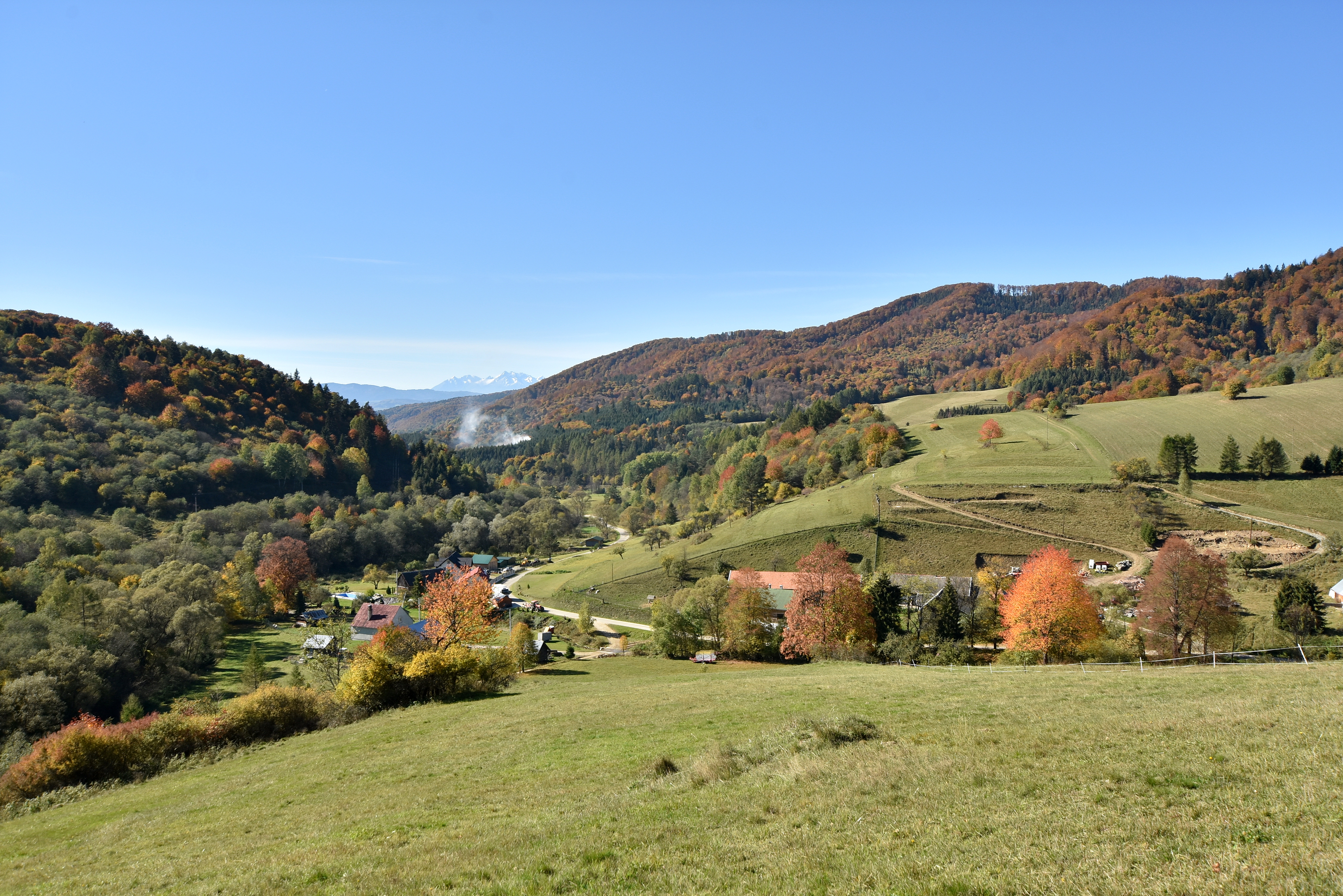

- Location within Poland
- Coordinates: 49°19′N 20°59′E
- Country: Poland
- Voivodeship: Lesser Poland
- County: Nowy Sącz
- Gmina: Muszyna
- Population: 40

Dubne [ˈdubnɛ] (Note: Lemko Rusyn: Дубне, Dubne) is a village in the administrative district of Gmina Muszyna, within Nowy Sącz County, Lesser Poland Voivodeship, in southern Poland, close to the border with Slovakia.
