= Stary Sącz =

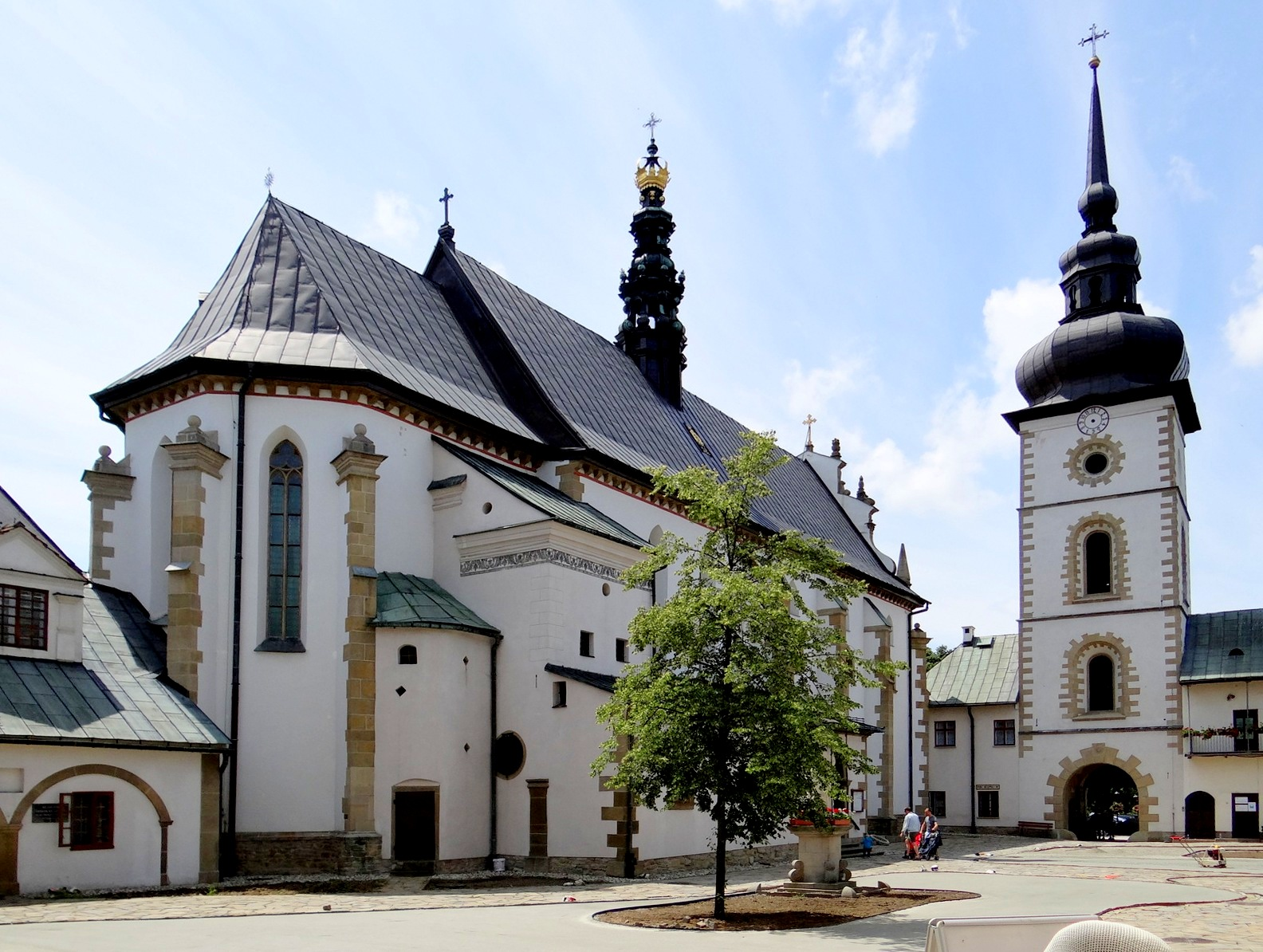
- Poor Clare Nuns monastery in Stary Sącz

- Flag Coat of arms

- Location within Poland
- Coordinates: 49°33′45″N 20°38′11″E
- Country: Poland
- Voivodeship: Lesser Poland
- County: Nowy Sącz
- Gmina: Stary Sącz
- Town rights: 1257

Government
  - Mayor: Jacek Lelek

Area
  - Total: 16.56 km^{2} (6.39 sq mi)
- Elevation: 320 m (1,050 ft)

Population (2021)
  - Total: 9,211
  - Density: 556.2/km^{2} (1,441/sq mi)
- Time zone: UTC+1 (CET)
  - Summer (DST): UTC+2 (CEST)
- Postal code: 33-340
- Vehicle registration: KNS
- Website: http://www.stary.sacz.pl

Historic Monument of Poland
- Designated: 2018-12-10
- Reference no.: Dz. U. z 2018 r. poz. 2415

Stary Sącz [ˈstarɨ ˈsɔnt͡ʂ] is a small historic town in Lesser Poland Voivodeship of southern Poland. It is the seat of the Gmina Stary Sącz (commune), and one of the oldest towns in the country, receiving Magdeburg rights in the 13th century.

== Geography ==
Stary Sącz is located in bottom of the valley called Kotlina Sądecka, between two rivers - Dunajec and Poprad, at an altitude of 320 metres (1,050 feet) above sea level.

== History ==
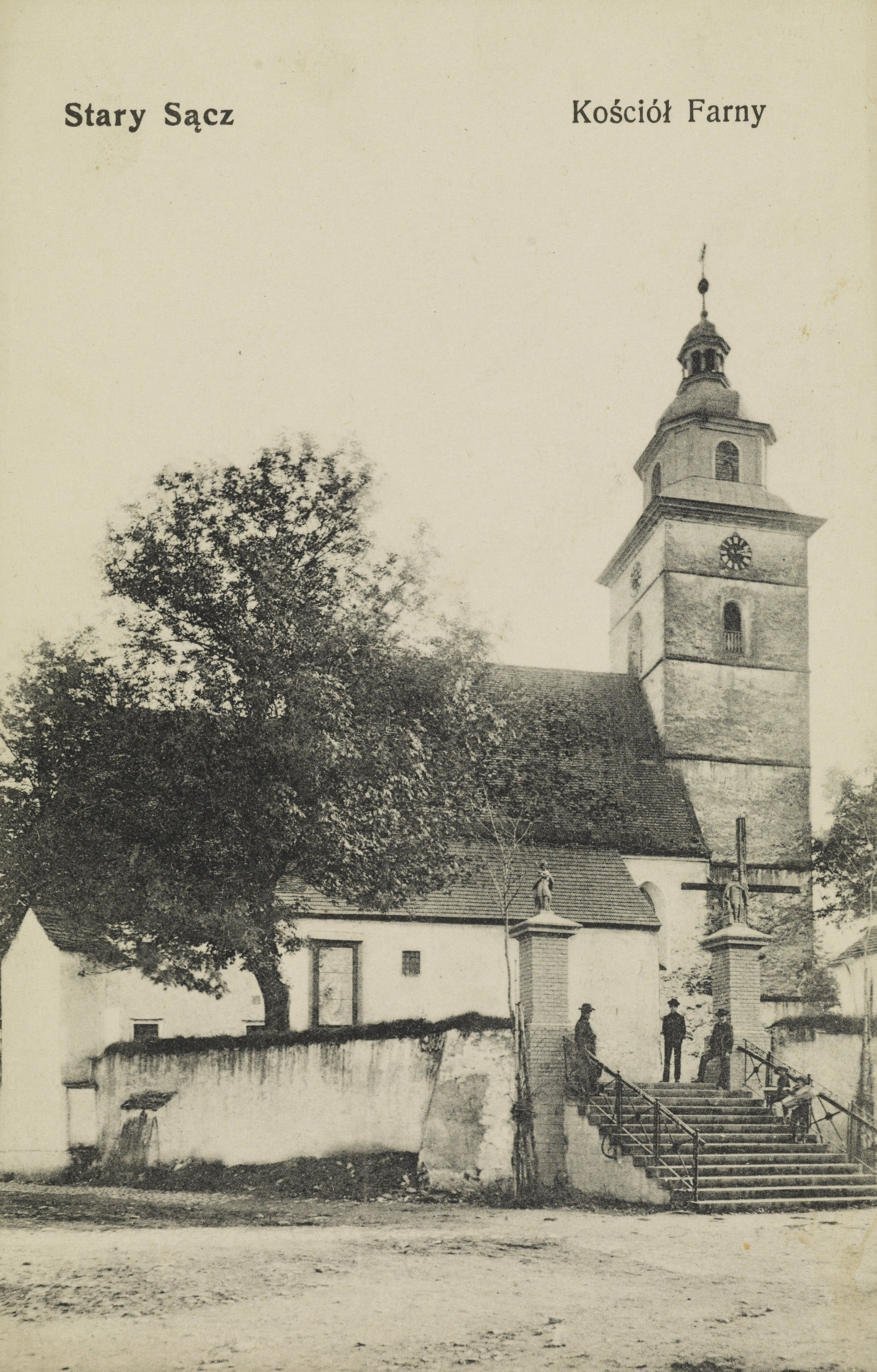
Saint Elisabeth church in the 1920s

The history of the town dates back to the Early Middle Ages when Duchess Kinga of Poland, the daughter of the King Béla IV of Hungary and the wife of Duke Bolesław V the Chaste, received the land called Sącz, together with surrounding villages, from her husband in the year 1257. It is assumed to be the date of the town foundation. Indeed, the Duchess must have loved the mountains very much, since she founded a Convent of the Poor Clares there in 1280 and she became its duchess herself. Almost at the same time, on the opposite slope of the Sącz hill, the seat of a Franciscan order was established also by Duchess Kinga. In the year 1358 the town received a privilege of the Magdeburg law, confirmed by King Casimir III the Great. An extremely advantageous location, on a very busy trade route to Hungary, fostered the town's rapid development. However the town was often damaged by disasters, of which fires were the most harmful. The town also did not manage to escape floods, plagues, and wars. During the biggest fire in its history in 1795, the entire town almost burned down.

In 1999, the town was visited by Pope John Paul II who attracted a crowd of 600,000 people for a mass which was dedicated to St. Kinga of Poland.

== Tourism, recreation and sport ==
Stary Sącz has unique medieval architecture and many monuments of ecclesiastical buildings.

At the fork of the rivers Dunajec and Poprad is a recreation area with a few ponds. (Their overall surface-area is 14 ha (35 acres)). These ponds contain numerous fish, including carp, trout and sanders, and rainbow trout in a special fishery.

Stary Sącz, situated in the lag of the Poprad Landscape Park is also the seat of the Park Service. One of Poland's biggest landscape parks stretches all over the range of the mountains Radziejowa and Jaworzyna in the Beskid Sądecki region.

There are several hiking trails in the area, some of which start in Stary Sącz. These include:

- The Yellow Route: from the railway station in Stary Sącz via Moszczenica, Przysietnica into the Radziejowa range, where, on the Przehyba summit (1,175 m (3,855 ft)), it joins The Red Route heading towards Krościenko.
- The Blue Route: begins at the railway station in Barcice and via Wola Krogulecka climbs the Makowica summit (948 m (3,110 ft)).

A bike route goes from Stary Sącz to the Przehyba summit via Gołkowice and Skrudzina.

Many sporting event take place in Stary Sącz. Some of the most well attended are:

- The Polish Volleyball Championship of Forest-Schools with competitors from Denmark and Slovakia
- The Open Mountain Cycling Youth Competition
- The International Motorbike Rally
- The Mayor's Cup Street Race
- The All-Polish Ecological Rally
- The New Year's Eve Race from Stary Sącz to Nowy Sącz

== Twin towns – sister cities ==
Stary Sącz has the following sister cities:

- - Ness Ziona, Israel, 1996
- - Liptovský Hrádok, Slovakia, 2001
- - Keszthely, Hungary, 2001
- - Levoča, Slovakia, 2003
- - Menconico, Italy, 2003
- - Chuhuiv, Ukraine, 2004
- - Lambres-lez-Douai, France, 2007
- - Dunakeszi, Hungary, 2007
- - Kosd, Hungary, 2011
