= Szczawnik =

- Village
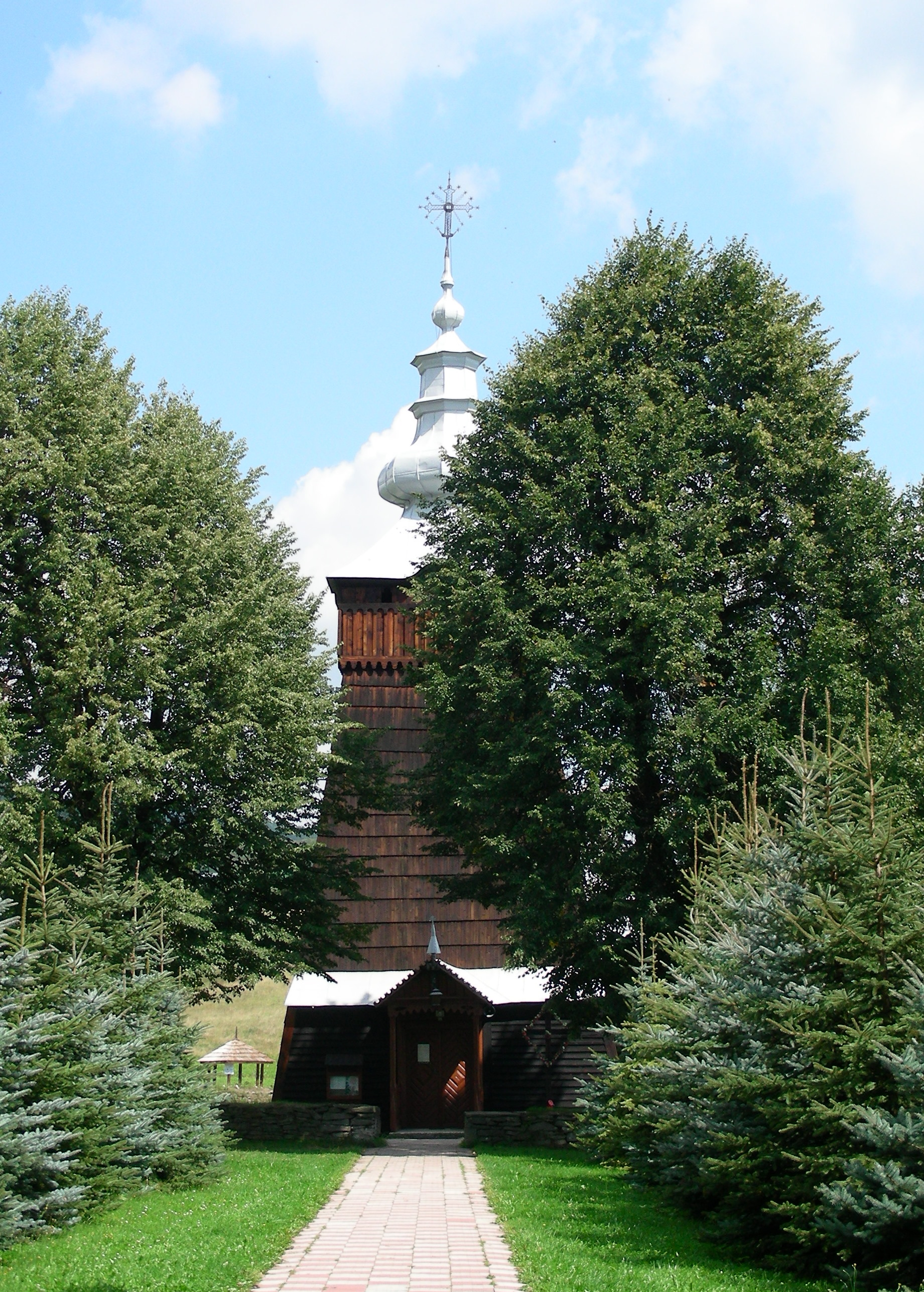
- Former Orthodox church, now Catholic church

- Location within Poland
- Coordinates: 49°23′N 20°52′E
- Country: Poland
- Voivodeship: Lesser Poland
- County: Nowy Sącz
- Gmina: Muszyna
- Population: 760

Szczawnik [ˈʂt͡ʂavɲik] is a village in the administrative district of Gmina Muszyna, within Nowy Sącz County, Lesser Poland Voivodeship, in southern Poland, close to the border with Slovakia.
