= Wojkowa =

Wojkowa Войкова
- Village
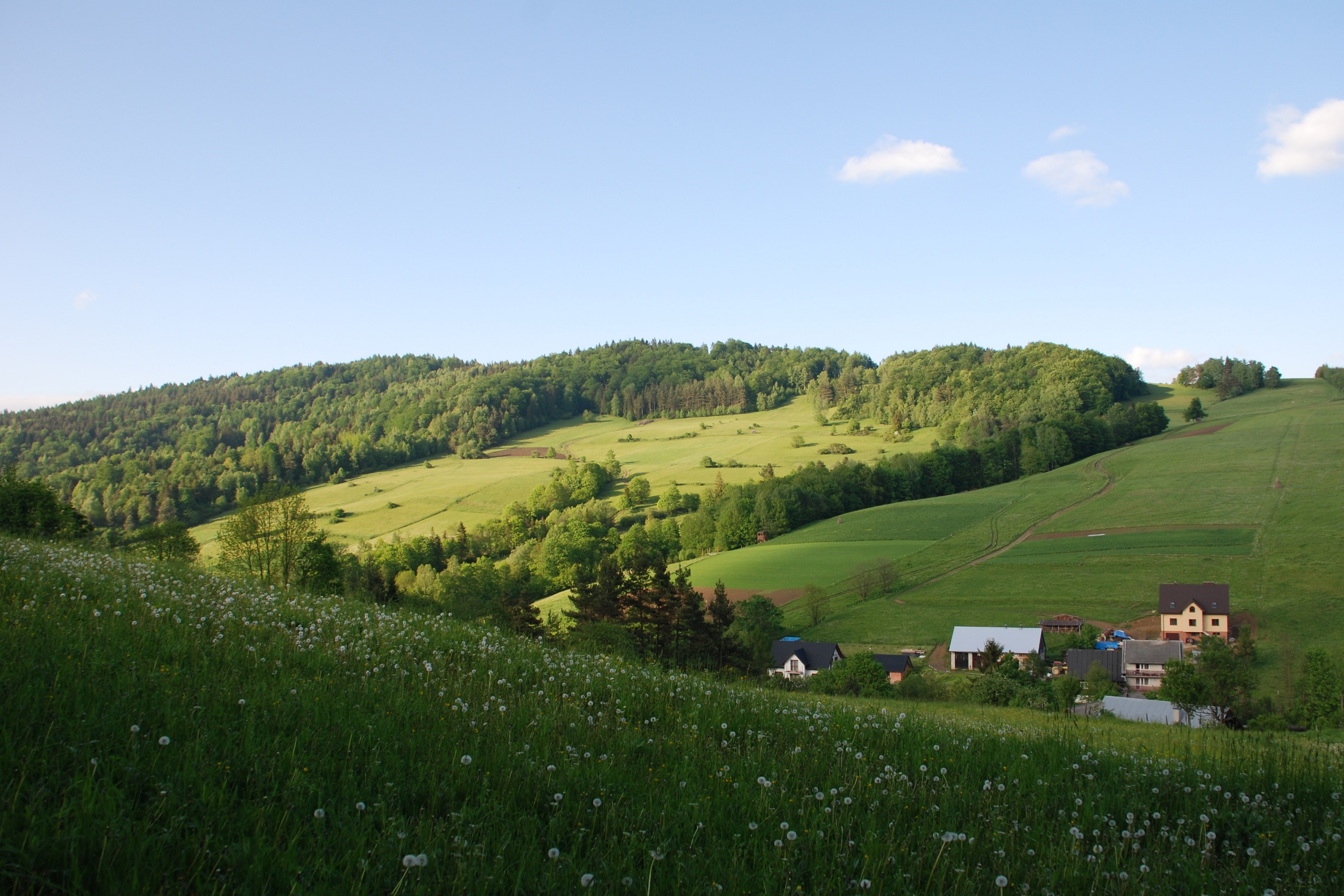

- Location within Poland
- Coordinates: 49°21′N 21°0′E
- Country: Poland
- Voivodeship: Lesser Poland
- County: Nowy Sącz
- Gmina: Muszyna

Wojkowa [vɔi̯ˈkɔva] (Ukrainian: Войкова, Voikova) is a village in the administrative district of Gmina Muszyna, within Nowy Sącz County, Lesser Poland Voivodeship, in southern Poland, close to the border with Slovakia.
