= Jastrzębik =

- Village
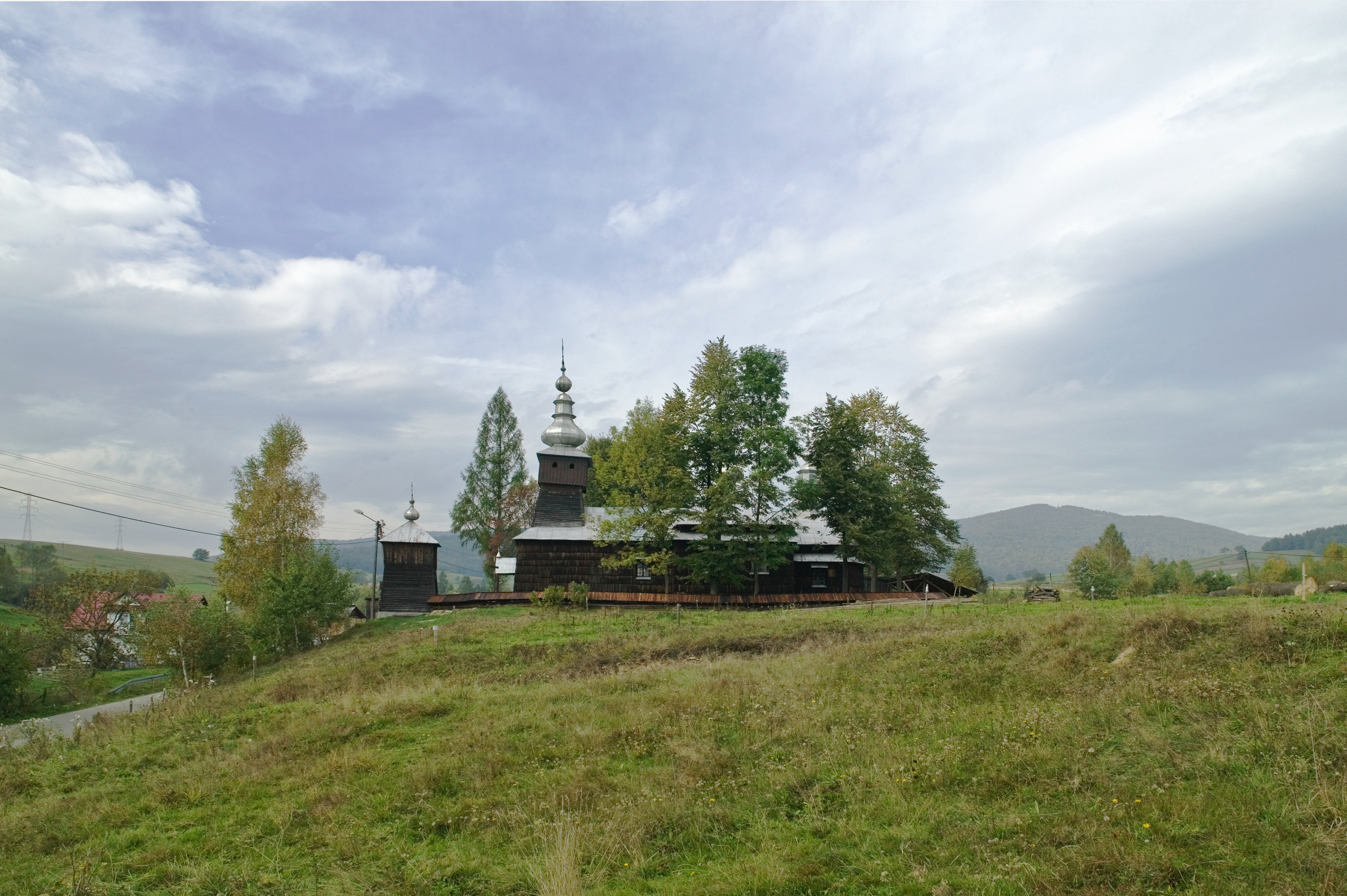
- View of the Greek Catholic Church of St. Luke in Jastrzębik

- Location within Poland
- Coordinates: 49°24′07″N 20°54′19″E
- Country: Poland
- Voivodeship: Lesser Poland
- County: Nowy Sącz
- Gmina: Muszyna
- Elevation: 550 m (1,800 ft)
- Population: 490

Jastrzębik [jasˈtʂɛmbʲik] is a village in the administrative district of Gmina Muszyna, within Nowy Sącz County, Lesser Poland Voivodeship, in southern Poland, close to the border with Slovakia.
