= Złockie =

- Village
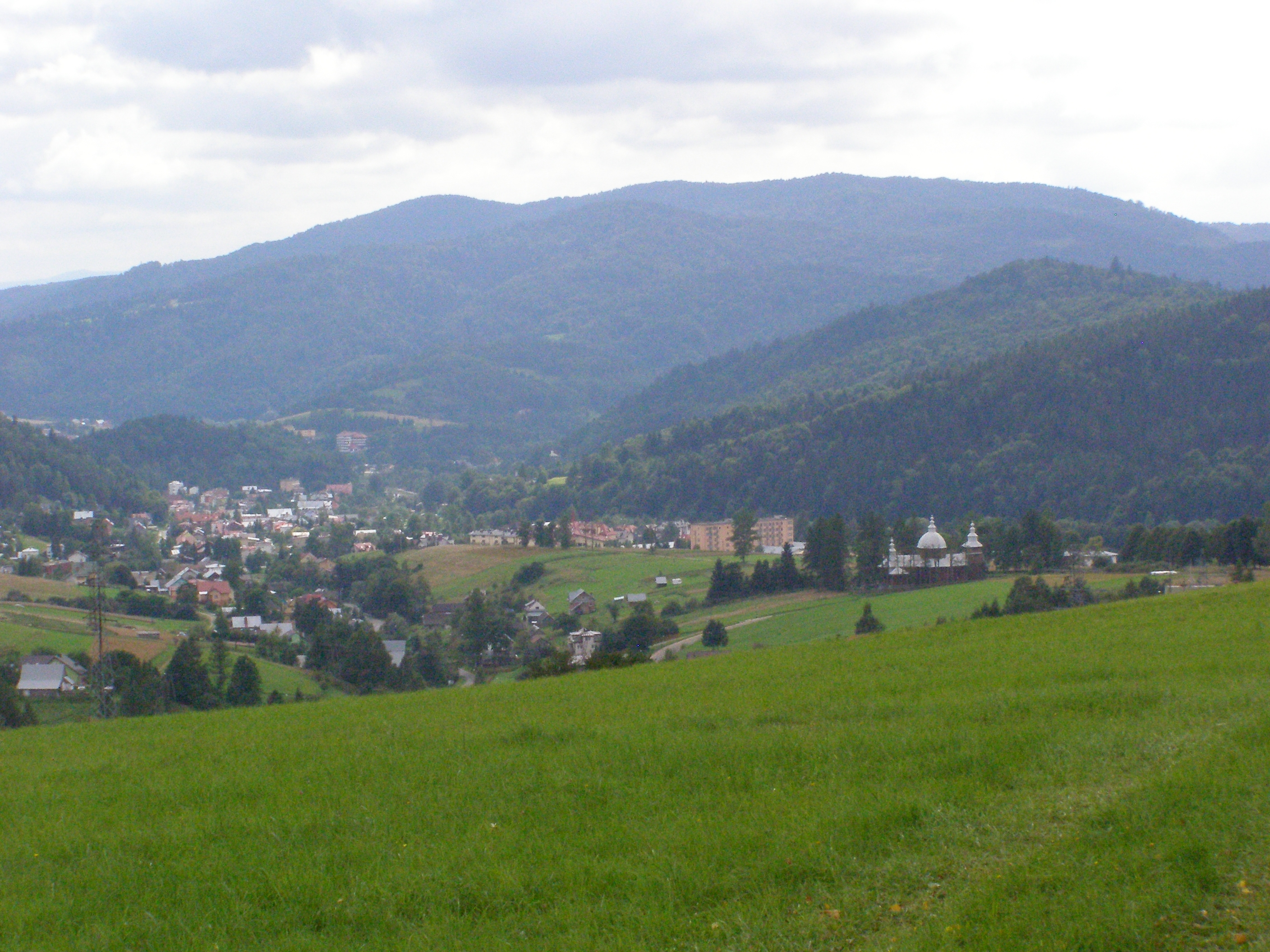

- Location within Poland
- Coordinates: 49°23′N 20°54′E
- Country: Poland
- Voivodeship: Lesser Poland
- County: Nowy Sącz
- Gmina: Muszyna

Złockie [ˈzwɔt͡skʲɛ] (Ukrainian: Злоцьке, Zlots’ke) is a village in the administrative district of Gmina Muszyna, within Nowy Sącz County, Lesser Poland Voivodeship, in southern Poland, close to the border with Slovakia.
