= Łopata Polska =

- Peninsula
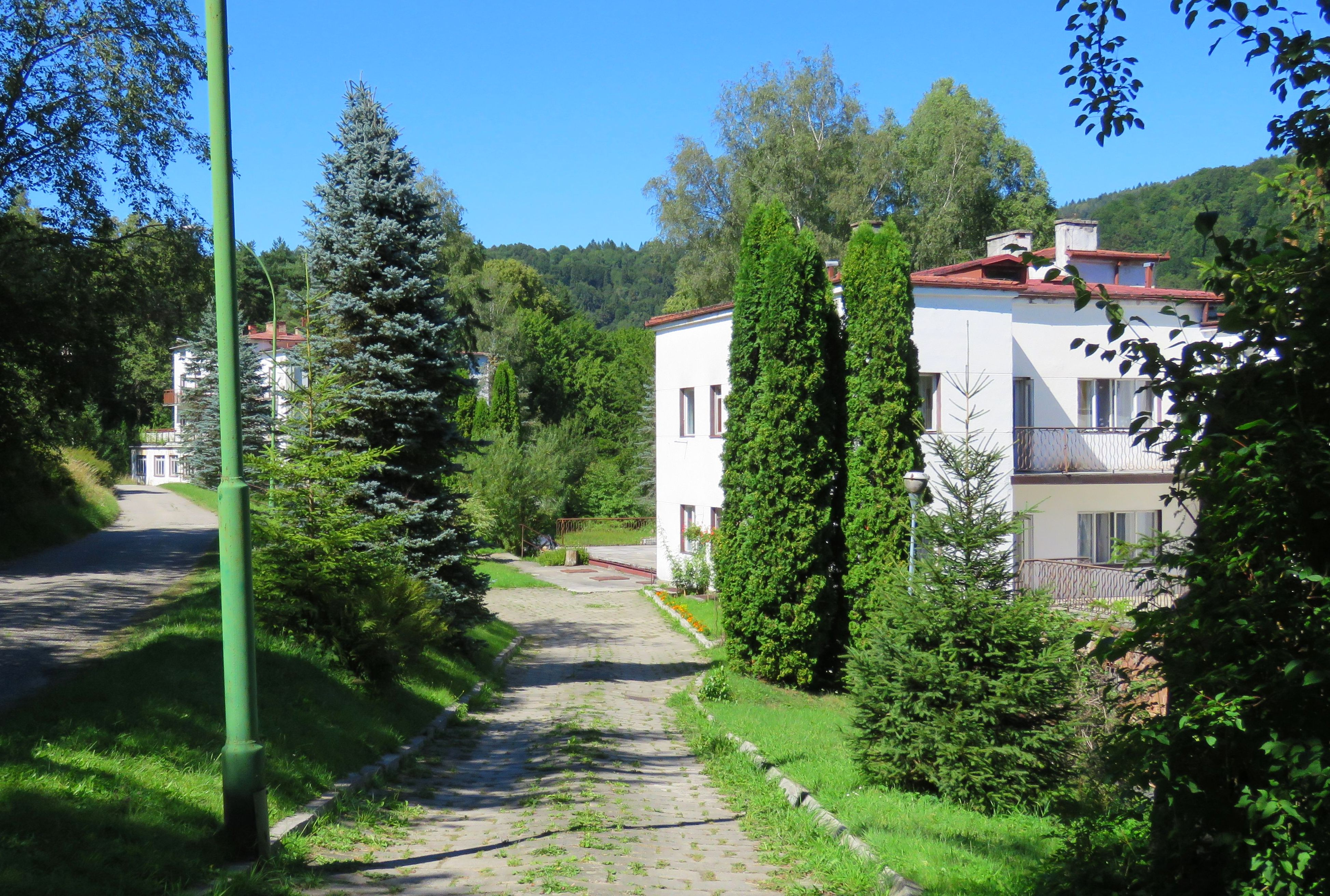

- Location within Poland
- Coordinates: 49°21′25″N 20°48′8″E
- Country: Poland
- Voivodeship: Lesser Poland
- County: Nowy Sącz
- Gmina: Muszyna

Łopata Polska [wɔˈpata ˈpɔlska] is a hamlet in the Żegiestów at the administrative district of Gmina Muszyna, within Nowy Sącz County, Lesser Poland Voivodeship, in southern Poland, close to the border with Slovakia.
