= Piwniczna-Zdrój =

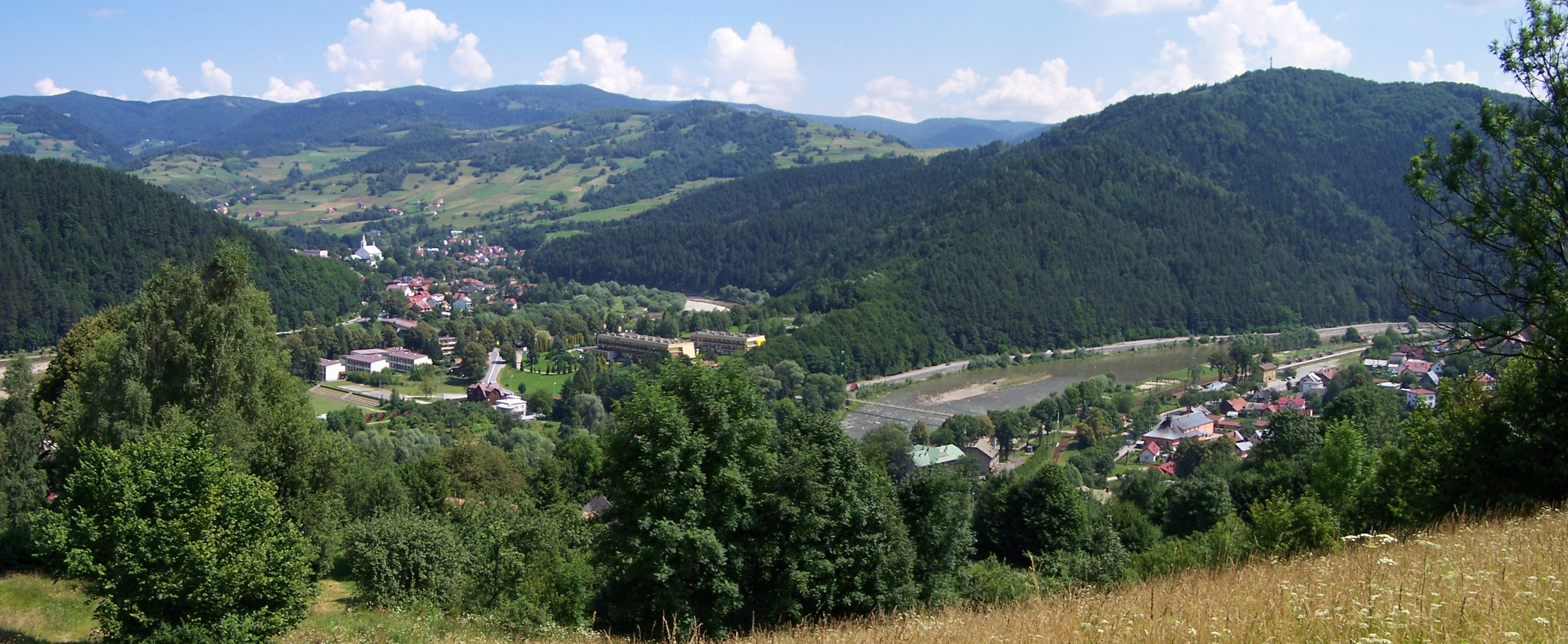
- Panorama of the town

- Flag Coat of arms
- Interactive map of Piwniczna-Zdrój
- Location within Poland
- Coordinates: 49°26′7″N 20°42′41″E
- Country: Poland
- Voivodeship: Lesser Poland
- County: Nowy Sącz
- Gmina: Piwniczna-Zdrój

Area
  - Total: 126.7 km^{2} (48.9 sq mi)
- Elevation: 562 m (1,844 ft)

Population (2012)
  - Total: 10 315
  - Density: 0.079/km^{2} (0.20/sq mi)
- Time zone: UTC+1 (CET)
  - Summer (DST): UTC+2 (CEST)
- Postal code: 33-350
- Vehicle registration: KNS
- Website: www.piwniczna.pl

Piwniczna-Zdrój [pʲivˈɲit͡ʂna ˈzdrui̯] (until 1999 Piwniczna) is a spa town in Nowy Sącz County, Lesser Poland Voivodeship, Poland, near the border with Slovakia. Piwniczna-Zdrój is the name of both the town and its administrative district called a gmina in Polish, namely the Gmina Piwniczna-Zdrój.

Piwniczna-Zdrój is a popular tourist destination in Beskid Sądecki, part of the Western Carpathians mountain range of southern Poland featuring a protected area called the Poprad Landscape Park with its picturesque Poprad River Gorge.

== Location ==
The total area of Piwniczna-Zdrój county is 3,830 ha (30.2% of which lies within the commune), while the rural area is 8,816 ha (69.8% of the commune). The municipal area consists of six villages: Młodów, Głębokie, Kokuszka, Łomnica-Zdrój, Wierchomla, and Zubrzyk.

In Poland, the word miasto is often used for both a town and a city. Miasto is a category applied on the basis of the administrative decision of the central government. The nearest English equivalent of Piwniczna-Zdrój would therefore be a town inside a county (gmina or powiat) that has a city charter. The equivalent title of County or Municipality however belongs to Nowy Sącz. The best matching organizational structure outside Poland would be a regional county municipality (RCM), which replaced established County designations in some countries and added layers of census divisions at its lower levels.

== History ==
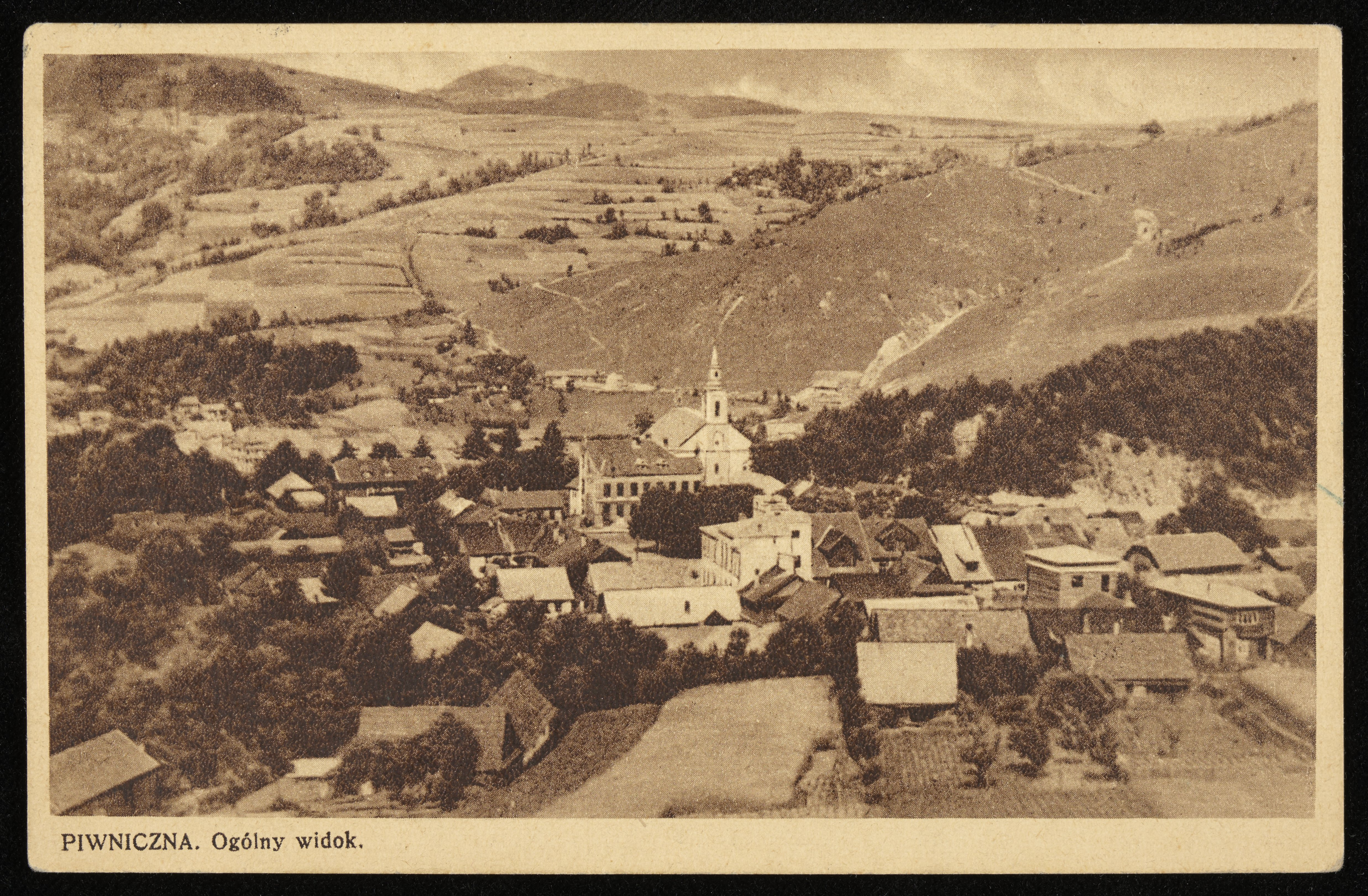
General view in 1936

In the Middle Ages, the settlement of Piwniczna was located along a busy merchant trail, which joined Poland with Upper Hungary (now Slovakia). To protect the route and increase tax revenue, on 1 July 1348, in Kraków, King Casimir III the Great granted a privilege to a wealthy resident of Nowy Sacz, Hanko, upon which a brand new town was to be established in an oxbow of the Poprad river. The town was granted Magdeburg rights, and was named after its location, as the Poprad oxbow was called Piwniczna Szyja.

Piwniczna prospered in the period known as Polish Golden Age. Since ca. 1590 the town was governed by starostas from Nowy Sacz, but good times ended during catastrophic Swedish invasion of Poland (1655 - 1660), when Piwniczna was ransacked and burned. On 7 April 1769, during the Bar Confederation, a battle between rebels and Russian forces took place here. In 1770, Piwniczna was occupied by Austrians, and following the First Partition of Poland (1772) Piwniczna became part of Austrian Galicia, in which it remained until 1918. In 1777, the population of Piwniczna was 1028.

For most of the 19th century, Piwniczna remained a small and poor town, with no industry. The situation began to change in the 1870s, when the rail line Tarnów - Stróże - Nowy Sącz - Leluchów was built. By 1880, the population of Piwniczna grew to almost 3,000, and since late 19th century, first tourists began to arrive here. Among them was the doctor Juliusz Korwin Gasiorowski from Lwow, who promoted local mineral waters.

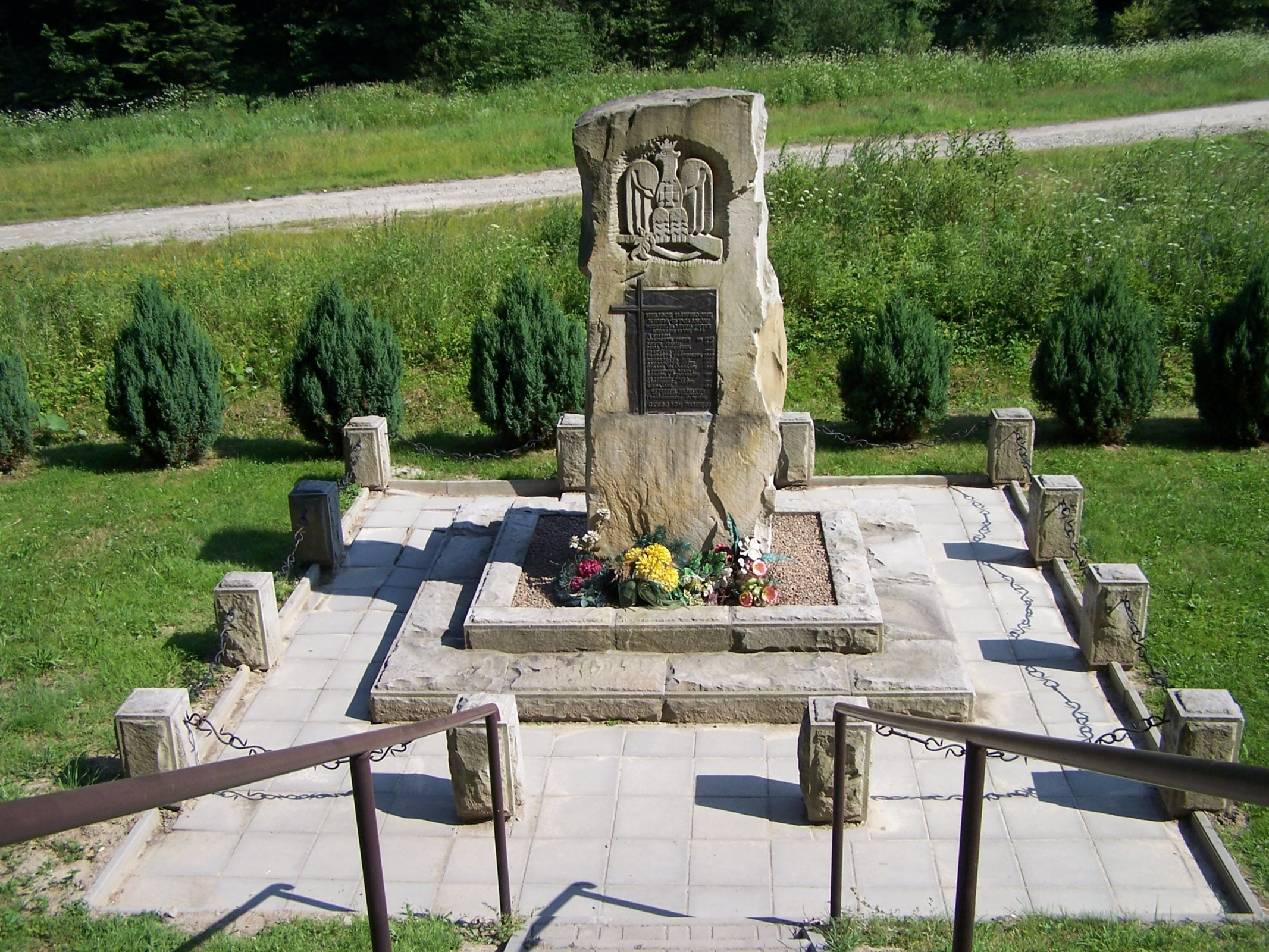
Memorial to local victims of World War II

In 1918 Piwniczna returned to Poland, and became part of Nowy Sacz County, Kraków Voivodeship. In the early 1930s, new baths were opened, and the town's importance as a spa grew. During the German occupation in World War II, the spa was used by the Wehrmacht soldiers. The town was seized by the Red Army in January 1945.

== Population ==
The municipality of Piwniczna-Zdrój is currently characterized by a negative balance of migration (both permanent and temporary), with more inhabitants leaving than arriving. The City Council suggests that the rate of migration is larger than what the statistics indicate, because many people, especially those going abroad, do not officially declare their absence.

Two different government statistical reports have similar, but different numbers for 2009. This reflects the current reforms, as the information and data becomes more consistent, and centralized. The 2006–2007 data were less consistent, infrequent, and prone to clerical errors. Future data are hoped to be more accessible and streamlined as EU guidelines are followed more closely.

Area, population, and ranking for 2009
Category	Area		Population		Ranking position	
	in ha	in km^{2}	total	per km^{2}	area in ha	population
Piwniczna-Zdrój	12646	126	10483	83	974	785
Piwniczna-Zdrój town	3830	38	5793	151	x	x
Piwniczna-Zdrój rural area	8816	88	4690	53	x	x

Urban population in 2009 and 2010
Area	2009	2010	of which males
Piwniczna-Zdrój	10505	10,494 ^{(1)}	5180
Piwniczna-Zdrój	5836	5,805	2883
Piwniczna-Zdrój	4669	4,689	2297

1. For 2010, most accurate published statistical data for Gmina, Town, Rural is: 10,494, 5,805, 4,689 respectively.

=== General population changes ===
In terms of nationality, the population of Piwniczna Zdrój is nearly homogeneous. Some 99.93% of residents of the municipality determine their nationality as Polish, with only seven people declaring another nationality. It is not clear or stated from what age group these people are in, or where they are from.

Local demographics	National demographics
1. 28.0% pre-working age 2. 58.3% of working age 3. 13.7% post-working age	1. 14.7% pre-working age 2. 71.6% of working age 3. 13.7% post-working age

Municipal Council of Piwniczna Zdroj is currently working under 2007–2013 Development Plan, where they have simply voiced and published recognition of the need and inability to meet or financially deal with any of major issues impeding on their future correction of problems, and growth stimulation. Some of the issues they point out to address, is the depletion and contamination natural resources, ranging from poor agricultural maintenance care affecting production and water quality, to items such as use of 80% household usage of low grade coal and coke for heating, to poor monitoring surface and ground water monitoring. The council did not address any pesticide production or use issues, though chemical production is one of Poland's GDP and the area suffers from depletion of natural resources. With the main focus concerning tourism which is primarily being sold and advertised as health and wellness, this is finally being acknowledged as being a topic of interest that should be for the community. Also the Municipal Council recognized that the tasks set in its recommended plans exceeds the capacity to finance it entirely from the community, and it becomes necessary to obtain financial assistance in the form of grants and concessional loans from the institutions which are involved in the financing of environmental projects, however no indication of what the community contributions or offers are.

Poland census data extracts for 2008 and 2010.

Population by gender, voivodeships, powiats and gminas in 2008
Region	Total	Males	Females	Urban areas			Rural areas		
				total	males	females	total	males	females
Poland	38115909	18408405	19707504	23305018	11041359	12263659	14810891	7367046	7443845
w. małopolskie	3282378	1590492	1691886	1619103	765827	853276	1663275	824665	838610
p. krakowski	670492	328157	342335	152594	72740	79854	517898	255417	262481
Kraków	756441	353816	402625	756441	353816	402625	-	-	-
p. nowosądecki	763455	375224	388231	256094	122004	134090	507361	253220	254141
p. oświęcimski	632392	308513	323879	286653	137501	149152	345739	171012	174727
p. tarnowski	459598	224782	234816	167321	79766	87555	292277	145016	147261
WOJ. MAŁOPOLSKIE	3282378	1590492	1691886	1619103	765827	853276	1663275	824665	838610
Powiat nowosądecki	200590	99861	100729	36849	17699	19150	163741	82162	81579
gm. m-w. Piwniczna-Zdrój	10474	5172	5302	5789	2874	2915	4685	2298	2387

Population by gender, voivodeships, powiats and gminas in 2010
Region	Total	Males	Females	Urban areas			Rural areas		
				total	males	females	total	males	females
POLAND	38200037	18444373	19755664	23264383	11013749	12250634	14935654	7430624	7505030
MAŁOPOLSKIE	3310094	1603967	1706127	1627838	769769	858069	1682256	834198	848058
krakowski	685299	335488	349811	154882	73813	81069	530417	261675	268742
m. Kraków	756183	353354	402829	756183	353354	402829	-	-	-
nowosądecki	772344	379740	392604	258567	123331	135236	513777	256409	257368
oświęcimski	634549	309374	325175	284936	136578	148358	349613	172796	176817
tarnowski	461719	226011	235708	173270	82693	90577	288449	143318	145131
Powiat nowosądecki	204092	101599	102493	36464	17459	19005	167628	84140	83488
gm. m-w. Piwniczna-Zdrój	10494	5180	5314	5805	2883	2922	4689	2297	2392

== Economy ==
Unemployment rate for the whole municipality is 22.4% while in the district of Nowy Sącz it is 30.7%. The national average is about 20.6%. This data is stated by Council, which slightly differs from the Nowy Sącz District statement of the lower 18.7% unemployment rate in the public investment offers.

Primary business is tourism, followed by the mineral water and spa facilities. The number of registered business entities on record is 703, much higher than the county per capita average. The total of 491 registered companies are located in the city, and 212 in the rural areas. But very often as council states, they are sole proprietorships, not generating new jobs. Considering the recent History of Poland (1945–1989), its shortage economy, black market and the majority of the population supported Solidarity (Polish trade union), it is unclear how the community has recovered. The Solidarity organization still actively continues as a trade union, and the area is on a trade corridor with Slovakia.

The community finally made a statement: “Analyzing the municipal budget Piwniczna Zdroj in different years, it is noted declining revenues and income, which among other things affect changes made in the regulations on local taxes and fees. Paradoxically, the diminishing of local government own revenues may be deprived of the possibility of obtaining funds from the Structural Funds, in order to raise funds because the funds must have their own contribution, which in most cases is 50% of the entire project. Furthermore, the implementation of projects under the Structural Funds to implement their rule in the form of reimbursement of expenses incurred by the beneficiary eligible for the amount specified in the contract.”

=== Environmental concerns ===
Due to European Union agreements and treaties being signed, Environmental concerns and data are becoming part of the census data being collected and published. The European Union, as well as the rest of the world has investigative and corrective mechanisms in place, which trickle down to the micro level. The local council must address the issues that are raised in reports. According to the local documents, they are claiming lack of local resources and financing, and looking for external assistance. However, from the financial reports, they do not intend to raise or restructure local taxes, incur debt, or investigate and stem any black market or inaccurate financial reporting.

Industrial And Municipal Wastewater Discharged Into Waters Or Into The Ground From Selected Health Resorts In 2010 excluding municipal waste, On own and other landfills (dumps, slag heaps, tailing ponds)
health resorts	Total in dam3 (decameters)	Treated				Untreated		
		total	mechanically	chemically	biologically and with increased biogen removal	total in dam3	directly from industrial plants	sewerage system
Piwniczna	126	100,0	-	4,0	96,0	-	-	-

Waste In Health Resorts In 2010 (in thousand tonnes) excluding municipal waste, On own and other landfills (dumps, slag heaps, tailing ponds)
health resorts	Waste generated during the year					Waste landfilled (accumulated)
	grand total	recovered	treated		temporarily stored	
			total	of which landfilled		
Piwniczna-Zdrój	99.2	1.5	97.7	97.7	0	2185.6
