= Muszyna =

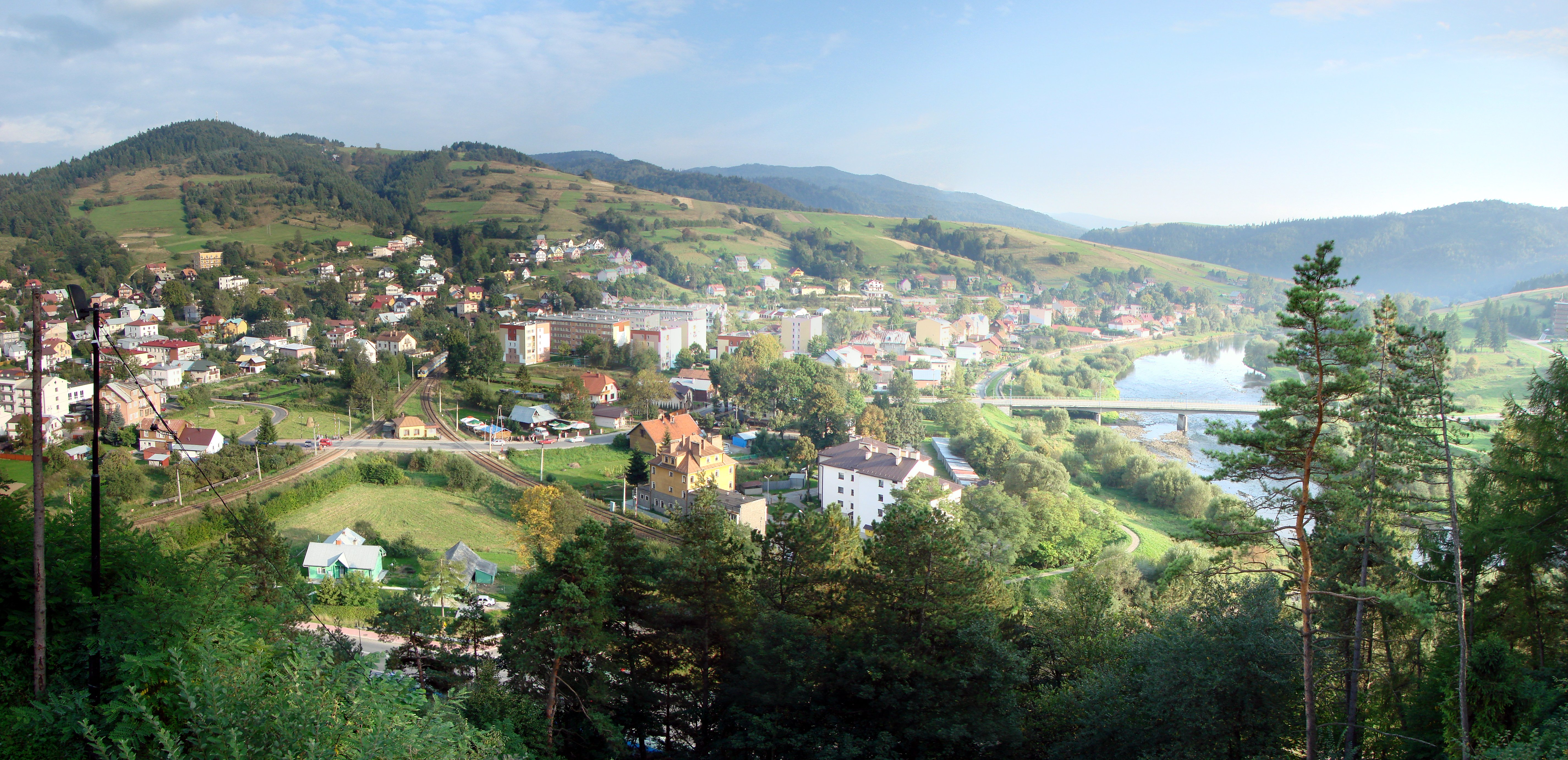
- View of Muszyna with bridge over Poprad river, part of the Poprad Landscape Park

- Flag Coat of arms

- Location within Poland
- Coordinates: 49°21′30″N 20°54′0″E
- Country: Poland
- Voivodeship: Lesser Poland
- County: Nowy Sącz
- Gmina: Muszyna

Government
  - Mayor: Jan Golba

Area
  - Total: 23.96 km^{2} (9.25 sq mi)
- Elevation: 450 m (1,480 ft)

Population (2006)
  - Total: 4,980
  - Density: 208/km^{2} (538/sq mi)
- Time zone: UTC+1 (CET)
  - Summer (DST): UTC+2 (CEST)
- Postal code: 33-370
- Car plates: KNS
- Website: http://www.muszyna.pl

Muszyna [muˈʂɨna] is a town in the Lesser Poland Voivodeship, southern Poland. It had a population of 4,989 as of 2006 and plays host to a railroad junction, located near border with Slovakia, with trains going into three directions - towards Nowy Sącz, Krynica-Zdrój and southwards, to Slovakia. The distance from the town to the Slovak border is 5 kilometres (3 miles).

Muszyna lies in the valley of the Poprad, at an altitude of 450 metres (1,476 feet) above sea level. The town has the status of a spa, with the Poprad Landscape Park and the picturesque Poprad River Gorge located nearby.

== History ==
Muszyna's development is tied with proximity of the southern borders of the Polish state. The settlement was located along the so-called “Hungarian Trail”, as for centuries Slovakia belonged to the Kingdom of Hungary. Muszyna was first mentioned in 1209, in a document in which King Andrew II of Hungary allowed local parish priest to collect tolls at the Poprad river near Muszyna. At that time, the settlement belonged to the Niegowicki family (Półkozic coat of arms). In 1288 Muszyna passed into the hands of Bishops of Kraków, and in the early 14th century, King Władysław I the Elbow-high, after a conflict with Bishop Jan Muskata, and the Rebellion of wójt Albert, decided to make the village a royal property. Muszyna remained in the hands of Polish kings for almost 100 years, and in 1356, it was granted Magdeburg rights town charter by King Kazimierz Wielki.

On July 30, 1391, King Władysław II Jagiełło granted the so-called Muszyna State (with two towns and 35 villages) to the Bishops of Kraków. As a result, the Muszyna State (Państwo Muszyńskie) was treated as a separate territorial unit, with its own administration, army and courts. On behalf of Kraków Bishops, the property was governed by starostas, and remained in the hands of the bishops until 1781. In the 15th century, influx of settlers from Wallachia and Transcarpathia resulted in construction of several Orthodox churches. Muszyna was an important center of the Bar Confederation, and after Partitions of Poland, it became part of Austrian Galicia, where it remained from 1772 to 1918. In 1910 majority of the population was Polish, Poles were about 82% of the population, Jews were the biggest minority in Muszyna (about 16%), and there was also a small Lemko minority of about 2%. In 1918 Poland regained independence with Muszyna as a part of it. The locals of Muszyna traditionally speak in the Lesser Poland dialect.

=== Mineral springs ===
In the 1920s, thanks to the efforts of mayor Antoni Jurczak and doctor Seweryn Msciwujewski, Muszyna received the status of a spa town. In 1930 it became a member of the Association of Polish Spa Towns, and in 1932, first mineral springs (Antoni and Wanda) were opened. Muszyna's mineral waters contain several bioelements and make it a popular tourist destination across Poland.

== Sport ==
- Muszynianka Muszyna - women's volleyball team playing in Polish Seria A Women's Volleyball League: 7th place in 2003/2004 season, 1st place in 2005/2006, 2007/2008, 2008/2009 season.
