= Lopata (surname) =

Lopata (Czech feminine: Lopatová), or Łopata (Polish), is a Slavic surname. Notable people include:

- Helena Znaniecki Lopata (1925–2003), American sociologist
- Jadwiga Łopata, Polish organic farmer and activist
- Jan Łopata (born 1954), Polish politician
- Jiří Lopata (1936–2021), Czech footballer
- Kacper Łopata (born 2001), Polish footballer
- Stan Lopata (1925–2013), American baseball player
- Vasyl Lopata (born 1941), Ukrainian writer and painter

== See also ==
- Лопато, a similar Russian surname
