= Milik =

- Village
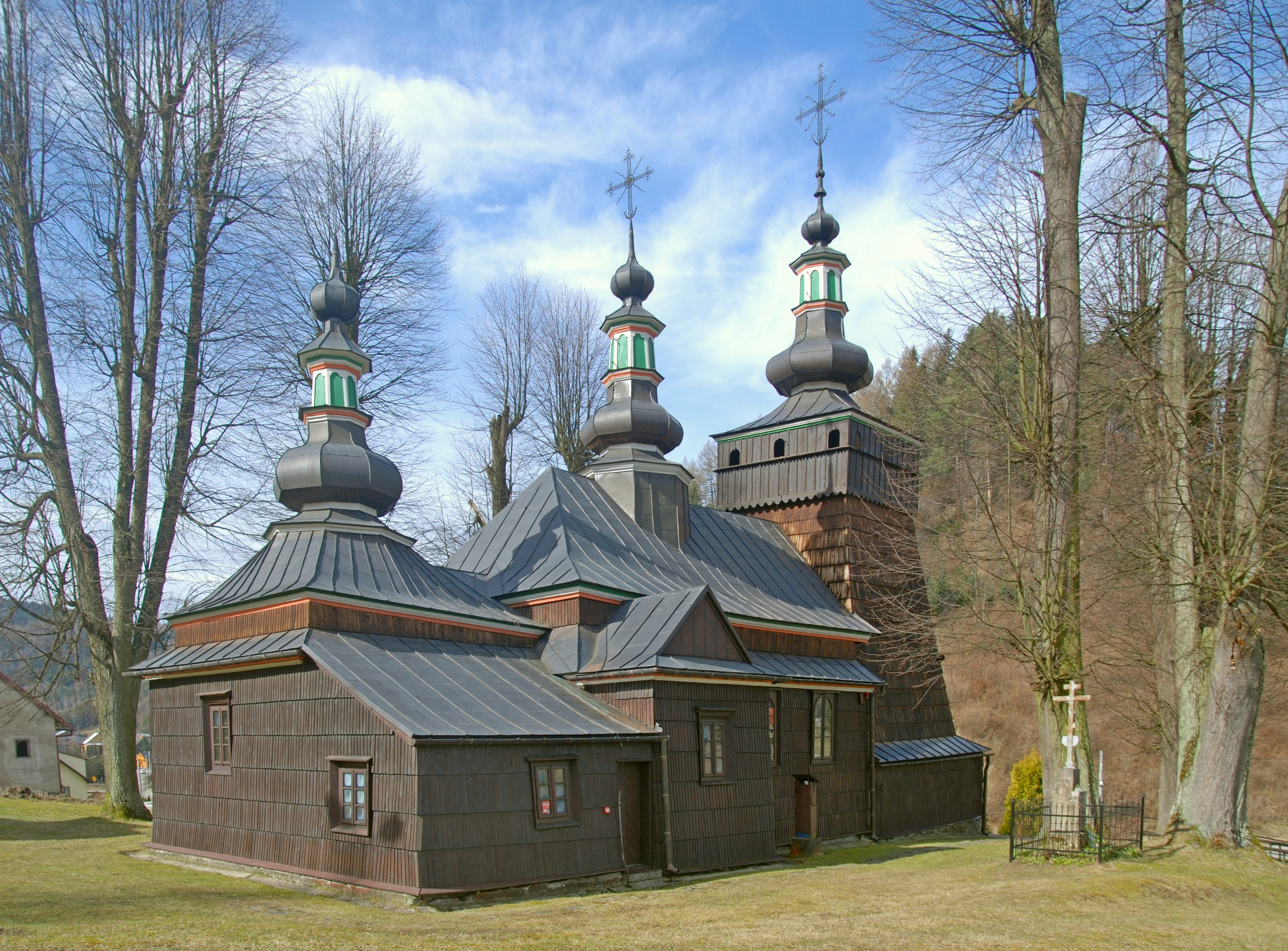
- Church of Saints Cosmas and Damian

- Location within Poland
- Coordinates: 49°23′N 20°51′E
- Country: Poland
- Voivodeship: Lesser Poland
- County: Nowy Sącz
- Gmina: Muszyna
- Elevation: 500 m (1,600 ft)

Population
  - Total: 700

Milik [ˈmʲilʲik] (formerly Mikowa) is a village in the administrative district of Gmina Muszyna, within Nowy Sącz County, Lesser Poland Voivodeship, in southern Poland, close to the border with Slovakia. It is located in the valley of the Milik river — a tributary of the Poprad.
