= Andrzejówka, Lesser Poland Voivodeship =

Andrzejówka
- Village
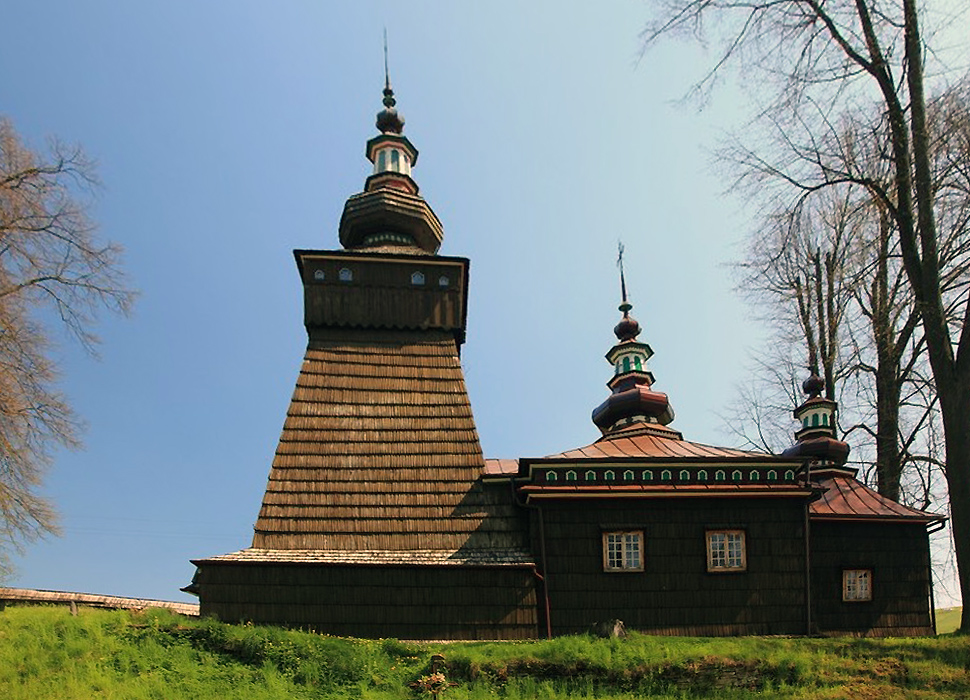
- Wooden church

- Location within Poland
- Coordinates: 49°21′N 20°49′E
- Country: Poland
- Voivodeship: Lesser Poland
- County: Nowy Sącz
- Gmina: Muszyna
- Founded: 1352

Andrzejówka [andʐɛˈjufka] (Note: Lemko Rusyn: Андриівка, Andriivka) is a village in the administrative district of Gmina Muszyna, within Nowy Sącz County, Lesser Poland Voivodeship, in southern Poland, close to the border with Slovakia.

The village existed as early as the 13th century, but was formally established under German municipal concerns in 1352. In 1391, King Władysław II Jagiełło of Poland gave Andrzejówka to the Bishop of Kraków.
