= Leluchów =

- Village
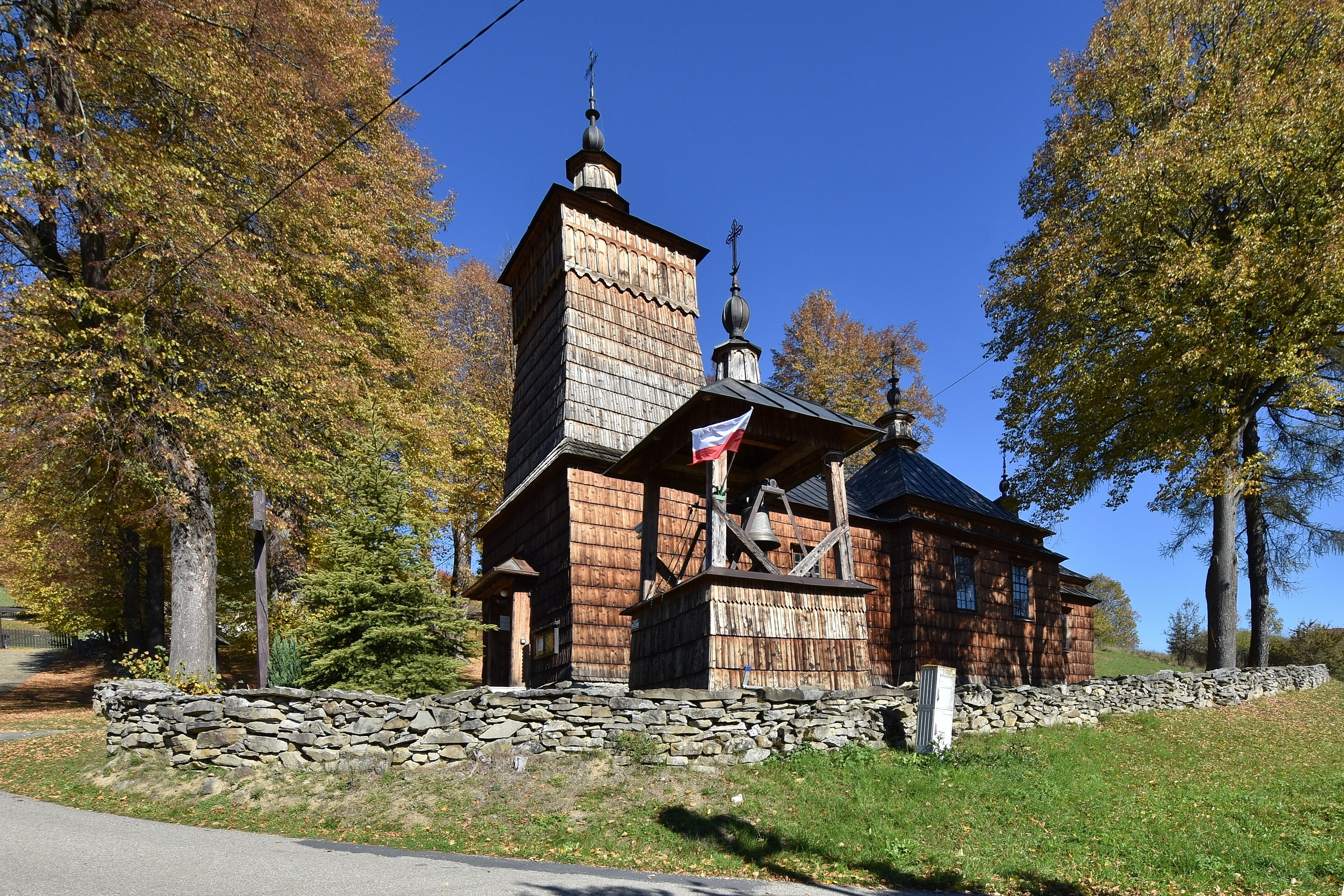
- Church of Saint Demetrius in Leluchów

- Location within Poland
- Coordinates: 49°18′N 20°56′E
- Country: Poland
- Voivodeship: Lesser Poland
- County: Nowy Sącz
- Gmina: Muszyna
- Time zone: UTC+1 (CET)
  - Summer (DST): UTC+2 (CEST)
- Vehicle registration: KNS

Leluchów [lɛˈluxuf] is a village in the administrative district of Gmina Muszyna, within Nowy Sącz County, Lesser Poland Voivodeship, in southern Poland, close to the border with Slovakia.
