= Żegiestów =

- Village
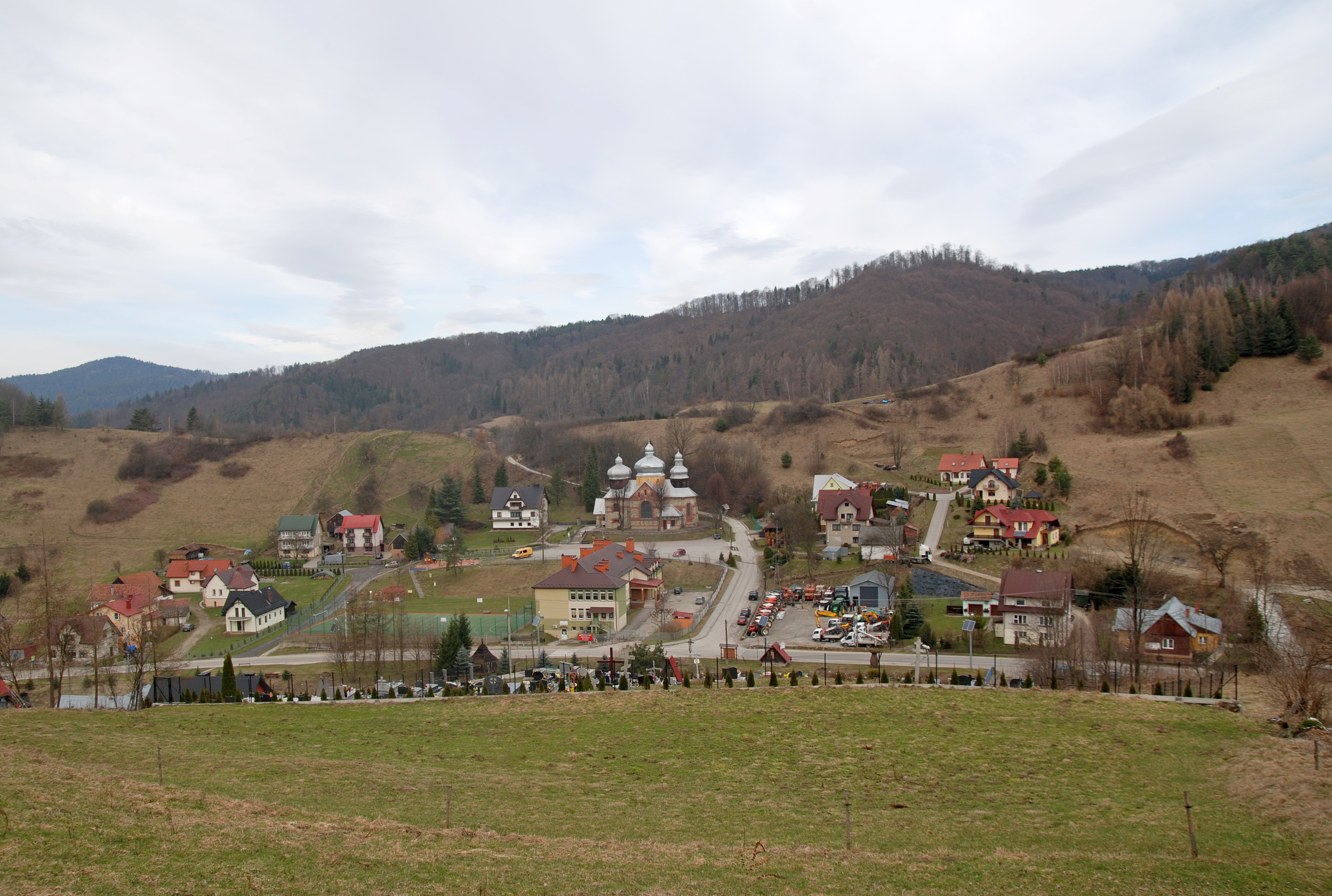

- Location within Poland
- Coordinates: 49°23′N 20°48′E
- Country: Poland
- Voivodeship: Lesser Poland
- County: Nowy Sącz
- Gmina: Muszyna
- Elevation: 486 m (1,594 ft)
- Population: 910
- Website: www.zegiestow.pl

Żegiestów [ʐɛˈɡʲɛstuf] (Rusyn: Жеґестів, Zhegestiv,) is a spa village in the administrative district of Gmina Muszyna, within Nowy Sącz County, Lesser Poland Voivodeship, in southern Poland, close to the border with Slovakia.

== History ==
Before World War II it experienced an impressive growth period, becoming a fashionable resort competing with neighbouring Piwniczna and Muszyna. The vast majority of the village's residents before World War II were Lemko Rusyns, but after the war most of them were forcibly resettled to the Soviet Union, and the remaining ones to western Poland as part of Operation Vistula.

In 1947 the communist government nationalized the spa facilities, but since 1990 the company that originally owned them has been taking legal steps to recover its property. The condition of the buildings has deteriorated, and the Spa House (Dom Zdrojowy) has not been used since 2004.
