= Poprad Landscape Park =

Protected area in Poland

- Popradzki Park Krajobrazowy
- IUCN category V (protected landscape/seascape)
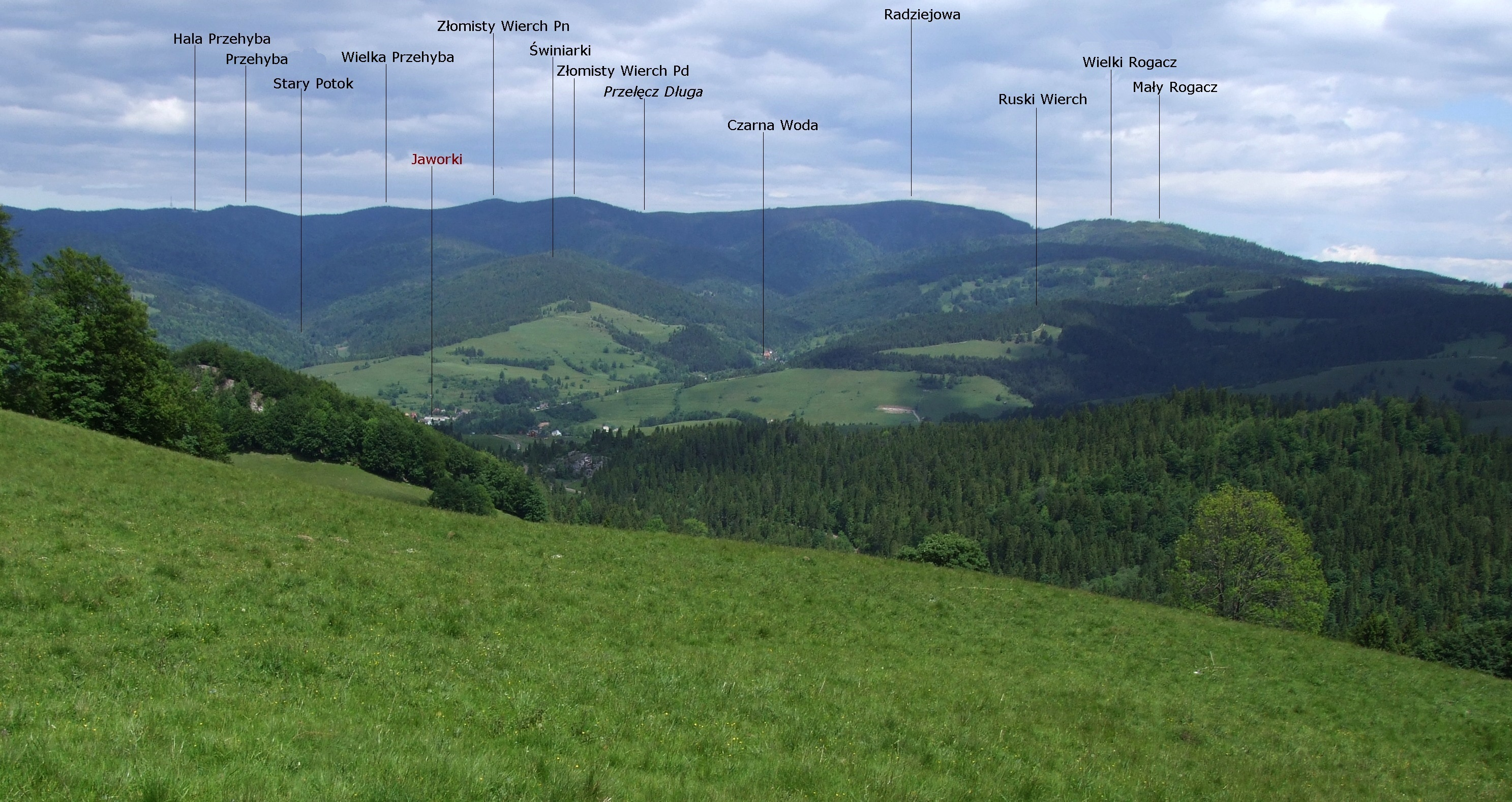
- View from Mount Durbaszka
- Interactive map of Poprad Landscape Park
- Location: Lesser Poland Voivodeship
- Coordinates: 49°26′37″N 20°47′43″E
- Area: 54,212 ha (133,960 acres)

Poprad Landscape Park (Popradzki Park Krajobrazowy) is a protected area (Landscape Park) in southern Poland, named after the Poprad river running through it.

The Park, with the total area of 54,212 ha (133,960 acres), is one of the biggest landscape parks in the country, created in 1987. It lies within Lesser Poland Voivodeship, in the part of the Beskid mountain range called Western Carpathians south of Nowy Sącz, in the basin of the Poprad river with its picturesque gorge. It borders Slovakia.
